= Coming of Age in Karhide =

1995 short story by Ursula K. Le Guin

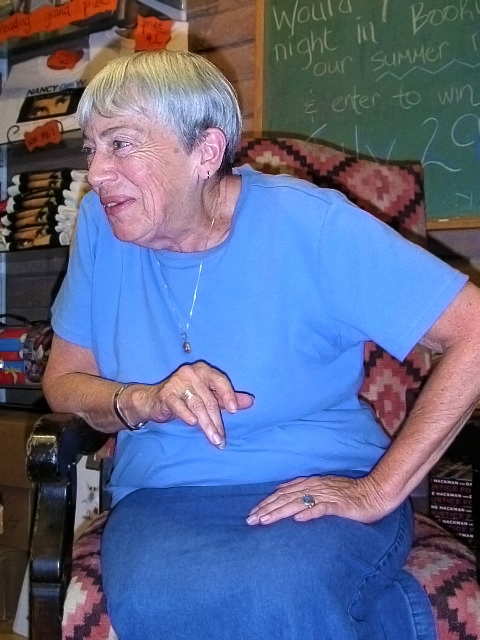
Ursula K. Le Guin, the author, in 2004.

"Coming of Age in Karhide" is a science fiction short story by Ursula K. Le Guin, first published in 1995. The story is set on the fictional planet of Gethen, the same as Le Guin's 1969 novel The Left Hand of Darkness, and is a part of Le Guin's Hainish cycle. The story explores themes of growing into adulthood on a planet where individuals have no fixed biological sex. Reviewers stated that the story went further than Left Hand in its exploration of biological sex and sexuality, and was a "quietly feminist" work. It was also described as lacking the "dizzying impact" of Left Hand. In 2002, it was anthologized in the volume The Birthday of the World, along with many other stories exploring marriage and sexual relationships.

== Setting ==
"Coming of Age in Karhide" is set on the fictional planet of Gethen, a part of the Hainish universe, created by Le Guin. The planet is also the setting for Le Guin's Hugo and Nebula award-winning 1969 novel The Left Hand of Darkness. In this alternative history, human beings did not evolve on Earth, but on Hain. The people of Hain colonized many neighboring planetary systems, including Earth and Gethen, possibly a million years before the setting of the novels. Some of the groups that "seeded" each planet were the subjects of genetic experiments, including on Gethen.

In the language of its people, "Gethen" means "Winter," and as its name indicates, is a planet that is always cold. The inhabitants of Gethen are sequentially hermaphroditic humans; for twenty-four days (somer) of each twenty-six-day lunar cycle, they are sexually latent androgynes. They only adopt sexual attributes once a month, during a period of sexual receptiveness and high fertility, called kemmer. During 'kemmer' they become sexually male or female, with no predisposition towards either, although which sex they adopt can depend on context and relationships. This absence of fixed gender characteristics led Le Guin to portray Gethen as a society without war, and also without sexuality as a continuous factor in social relationships. On Gethen, every individual takes part in the "burden and privilege" of raising children, and rape and seduction are virtually absent.

== Plot ==
The story is told from the point of view of Sov Thade Tage em Ereb, a teenager who lives in a large communal home in the Karhidish city of Rer. The 140 Gethenians in the house are all a single family. None of its members form long-lasting marital bonds (known on Gethen as "keeping kemmer"); instead, individuals go to a communal "kemmerhouse" when they are sexually receptive, and any children that are conceived are raised in the "hearth," or communal home. As a result, Sov grows up among a number of cousins and siblings, none of whom know who their sire is.

Upon turning fourteen, Sov witnesses the "Somer-forever" party of their mother's sibling, who has reached the age where sexual activity is no longer possible. Witnessing this makes Sov wonder about their own sexuality, which Sov was not concerned about before reaching sexual maturity. That spring Sov begins an apprenticeship at a carpenter's workshop, and begins to feel like an adult. At the same time, Sov begins to experience mood swings and symptoms of illness. Sov goes to their mother, who says that Sov is coming into kemmer for the first time. Sov discusses this with a cousin, Sether, who is having the same experience. Both teenagers express fears that being in kemmer is dehumanizing, and involves becoming a "sex machine".

On the day Sov is due to kemmer, their family takes them to the kemmerhouse after presenting them a new set of clothes and going through traditional celebratory rituals. Sov is welcomed into the kemmerhouse with elaborate ritual. The first person Sov encounters is already in kemmer as a male, and his pheromones and touch lead to Sov kemmering as a female. Over the next few days she has sexual experiences with a number of different men and women, and enjoys herself, although she is nervous and afraid. After coming out of kemmer Sov makes friends with another in the kemmerhouse, and a month later enters kemmer with Sether. Sov concludes by saying "The old days or the new times, somer or kemmer, love is love."

== Themes ==
"Coming of Age" examines themes of growing into adulthood, as well as ideas of gender and sexuality. In deliberate contrast to The Left Hand of Darkness, Le Guin's previous work which was set on the same fictional planet, Le Guin uses feminine pronouns for all the Gethenians when they are not in kemmer, and uses male or female pronouns for individuals in kemmer, depending on what sex they become. She does the same in a later reprinting of "Winter's King", another short story set on Gethen, first written in 1969. In addition, first-person narration discusses the difficulty of telling a story about people without fixed male or female characteristics, in a language that only has sexed pronouns.

"Coming of Age" examines Gethenian sexuality in greater detail than in Left Hand. In describing the story, Le Guin stated:

It seemed high time we got all the way into a kemmerhouse. With a native guide, instead of a poor uptight Earth guy trying to figure out what's going on and being disturbed by it ... Left Hand gives the reader very little opportunity to experience being double-gendered [...] I wanted to explore it as a natural, universal experience, instead of a weird alien condition. Back in 1968, I and most readers needed Genly Ai's POV to mediate the strangeness. I don't think we do, now.

She referred to the story as a sexual footnote to Left Hand.

Sandra Lindow stated that the kemmerhouse was an "effective cultural solution to the problem of sexuality," because socially acceptable promiscuous sex (both homo- and heterosexual) occurred in the absence of a power differential, thus making it healthy. In addition, Gethenians were shown as having an inbuilt mechanism which forces them to seek consent for any sexual activity. The story further challenges conventional sex mores because the narrator Sov is physically embraced by her male parent Karrid so that she may kemmer for the first time as a woman, according to the tradition within their family. However, Karrid does not take advantage of his position, and permits no further sexual activity to take place. Lindow states that this experimentation was possible in a story written in 1995 in a way that it was not when Left Hand was written; "In 1968 and 1969, Le Guin's imagination did not yet include Gethenian homosexuality, gynocentrism, or the multiplicity of connection possible inside a kemmerhouse; however, by 1995 [...] much had changed in the cultural acceptance of sexuality."

The story complicates the common theme of transitioning to adulthood by examining this transition on a planet where individuals have no fixed biological sex. The narrator Sov goes through a period of intense worry and anxiety when they learn that they are going to kemmer for the first time. After experiencing the kemmerhouse, however, they say that "love is love", no matter whether a person is in kemmer or not. Thus, the story separates the idea of love from a person's biological sex and sexuality.

== Publication and reception ==
The story was first published in 1995, in the collection New Legends, edited by Martin Greenberg and Greg Bear. The collection was published by Legend Books. Alexis Lothian called it a "quietly feminist story" that demonstrated Le Guin's shift in political views since writing Left Hand towards more explicit feminism.

The story was also published in Le Guin's 2002 collection The Birthday of the World, along with the original novella Paradises Lost and six other stories from the period 1994–2002. A review of that volume stated that "Coming of Age" lacked the "giddying impact" of The Left Hand of Darkness, with which it shared a setting. The review called it disappointing, and stated that it was "one of the two weakest stories in the book". With one exception, all of the works in the collection examine unorthodox sexual relationships and marriage.

== Sources ==
- Cummins, Elizabeth (1990). Understanding Ursula K. Le Guin. Columbia, South Carolina, USA: University of South Carolina Press. ISBN 978-0-87249-687-3.
- Le Guin, Ursula K. (2002). The Birthday of the World: and Other Stories. HarperCollins. ISBN 978-0-06-621253-1.
- Lindow, Sandra J. (2012). Dancing the Tao: Le Guin and Moral Development. Cambridge Scholars Publishing. ISBN 978-1-4438-4302-7.
- Reid, Suzanne Elizabeth (1997). Presenting Ursula Le Guin. New York: Twayne. ISBN 978-0-8057-4609-9.
- Spivack, Charlotte (1984). Ursula K. Le Guin (1st ed.). Boston, Massachusetts, USA: Twayne Publishers. ISBN 978-0-8057-7393-4.
- Watson, Ian (March 1975). "Le Guin's Lathe of Heaven and the Role of Dick: The False Reality as Mediator". Science Fiction Studies: 67–75.
