= Paradises Lost =

2002 novella by Ursula K. Le Guin

- Short story by Ursula K. Le Guin
- A poster for the 2012 opera adaptation of Paradises Lost
- Language: English
- Genre: Science fiction

Publication
- Published in: The Birthday of the World and Other Stories
- Publisher: HarperCollins
- Publication date: 2002
- Publication place: United States

Paradises Lost is a science fiction novella by American author Ursula K. Le Guin. It was first published in 2002 as part of the collection The Birthday of the World. It is set during a multigenerational voyage from Earth to a potentially habitable planet. The protagonists, Liu Hsing and Nova Luis, are members of the fifth generation born on the ship. The story follows them as they deal with members of a religious cult who believe the ship ought not to stop at its intended destination. They also face a crisis brought on by a drastic change in the ship's schedule. The novella has since been anthologized as well as adapted into an opera of the same name.

The novella explores the isolation brought on by space travel, as well as themes of religion and utopia. It contains elements of ecocriticism, or a critique of the idea that human beings are altogether separate from their natural environment. The novella and the collections in which it was published received high praise from commentators. For its generation ship setting and examination of utopia, critics compared it to other Le Guin works such as "Newton's Sleep", and The Telling, as well as to the works of Gene Wolfe and Molly Gloss. Scholar Max Haiven described the novella as "a chastening lesson in both the potential and the perils of freedom", while author Margaret Atwood said it "shows us our own natural world as a freshly discovered Paradise Regained, a realm of wonder".

== Setting ==
Nothing in the world has more or less than two legs. Nothing has wings. Nothing sucks blood. Nothing hides in tiny crevices, waves tendrils, scuttles into shadows, lays eggs, washes its fur, clicks its mandibles, or turns around three times before it lies down with its nose on its tail. Nothing has a tail. Nothing in the world has paws or claws. Nothing in the world soars. Nothing swims. Nothing purrs, barks, growls, roars, chitters, trills, or cries repeatedly two notes, a descending fourth, for three months of the year.

— Paradises Lost.

The setting of the novella is a multigenerational voyage from Earth to a planet potentially habitable by humans. Earth is referred to as "Ti Chiu", its Chinese name within the story, or as "Dichew", the children's version of the same term: the new planet is known as "Hsin Ti Chiu" ("New Earth", "Shindychew"). In describing the setting of the story in her introduction to Paradises Lost in 2002, Le Guin described its universe as a frequently used one: "the generic, shared, science fiction 'future.' In this version of it, Earth sends forth ships to the stars at speeds that are, according to our present knowledge, more or less realistic, at least potentially attainable." Le Guin identified Molly Gloss's novel The Dazzle of Day and Harry Martinson's poem "Aniara" as exemplifying this future. Though occasionally described as such, the story is not part of the Hainish Cycle. The title is an allusion to John Milton's epic poem Paradise Lost.

The two protagonists of the story are 5-Liu Hsing and 5-Nova Luis (known by their given names Hsing and Luis), with the "5" denoting that they are members of the fifth generation to be born aboard the ship (which is named Discovery). The environment of the spacecraft is highly controlled. Until the age of 7, all children roam naked, which presents no difficulties on a ship where the temperature is controlled, and all disease-causing organisms have been eliminated. The population of the ship is also tightly controlled, at a figure of approximately 4,000. Individuals are required to get contraception injections every 25 days, unless they make a pledge of chastity or strict homosexuality, or intend to conceive a child. All matter on the ship is carefully recycled, with no nonessential items ever lasting more than a few years, creating a "static eternal ecology."

The planet Earth is referred to as facing the social and environmental problems expected in contemporary society. The generation that boarded the ship intended their descendants to understand and value a terrestrial existence, but over time the words and images associated with being on a planet lose meaning to those on the ship, who become adapted to a shipboard existence, and struggle to understand the motivations of the zeroth generation. Aboard the Discovery, the major religions of Earth are depicted as having gradually lost meaning, but have been replaced by the religious cult of Bliss, with members known as angels. The adherents of the cult believe their purpose in life is to overcome their connections to a terrestrial existence. They do not see their belief as a religion, and believe the world outside the ship is an illusion. Only the voyage itself, and not the origin or destination, matters. In contrast to much of Le Guin's science fiction, which explores interactions between humans and extraterrestrial beings, the characters in Paradises Lost deal with being literally "extra-terrestrial", or disconnected from terrestrial life.

== Plot summary ==
The novella begins with 5-Liu Hsing, as a child, being taught about Earth through the use of virtual reality tapes, an experience to which her younger self takes exception. She develops a close friendship with 5-Nova Luis. At age seven, Hsing and the other children of similar age may put on clothes for the first time; Hsing greatly looks forward to this ceremony, a rite of passage aboard the Discovery. As the children grow older, Luis develops an interest in the virtual reality programs that allow people on the ship to explore the planet they have left behind. Disagreements with her friend Rosie, a member of Bliss, lead Hsing to explore the philosophy of the angels. Although she questions in her own mind the purpose of the voyage, she disagrees with the angels' thinking, which eventually damages her friendship with Rosie. Luis also investigates this group by participating in some of their practices.

Entering college at age 18, Hsing discovers that 4-Hiroshi Canaval, the teacher of Navigation, has asked her to be placed directly into the second-year navigation course. Hsing shows an aptitude for the subject, and in her third year makes it her profession. Luis becomes a doctor, and their academic separation leads to Hsing and Luis slowly drawing apart from one another. Hsing finds herself attracted to Hiroshi, and the two begin a romantic relationship. Three days after their wedding, Hiroshi tells Hsing that the focus of his life's work is not simply navigation, as is generally believed, but concealing a secret from the rest of the ship. A few years earlier, an unexpected gravitational effect led to the ship experiencing a vast acceleration, putting it 40 years early; it is expected to arrive at Hsin Ti Chiu in five years.

Hiroshi tells Hsing that he and a handful of allies, who believe the people on the ship should stop at Hsin Ti Chiu, have been keeping news of the acceleration secret. They believe that hiding the knowledge of the schedule provides them with a weapon against the angels, who do not wish the ship to stop at all. Hsing becomes a reluctant party to the conspiracy but is distressed by its secrecy and what she considers dishonesty, and persuades Hiroshi and his allies to go public with the information. Meanwhile, Luis thoroughly investigates the education program for the sixth generation aboard the ship (the generation supposed to land on Hsin Ti Chiu) and finds that large parts of it have been erased or replaced with propaganda by the angels. Luis gets the ruling council of the ship to launch an investigation into religious manipulation of the education program. Persuaded by Hsing, Hiroshi makes a public statement about the ship's new schedule, while concealing the fact that he had known about it for a while.

A few months later Luis is elected Chair of the ship's ruling council, and helps bring about a settlement wherein the people on board can choose whether to stay on the ship, and also choose whether the ship stays in orbit around Hsin Ti Chiu. Hsing has a child by Hiroshi, but Hiroshi dies soon afterward, of heart failure. The ship's educational curriculum is revised, and all schools are required to allow teachers who are not angels to teach material relevant to living on the new planet. The new planet proves to be habitable by humans, and around a quarter of the ship's population moves to it, settling down despite the difficulty of learning to live on a planet again. The ship leaves, not intending to return.

== Main characters ==
The two "co-protagonists" of the book are 5-Liu Hsing and 5-Nova Luis. Both Hsing and Luis have been described as protagonists typical of Le Guin's works, being somewhat isolated from the society in which they live due to their strong individuality and the fact that they do not entirely conform to societal expectations. As with other members of their generation, Hsing and Luis grow up in an environment devoid of terrestrial ties, as a result of which they are, as children, unfamiliar with the terms "hill", "sky" and "wind". Despite not understanding a planetary existence, Hsing and Luis are among the people who are not convinced by the beliefs of the angels. Instead, they question those beliefs and hold that a reality exists outside of their own human-created bubble, and are drawn to the idea of stimuli other than those created by humans.

=== Hsing ===
Hsing is of Chinese and European descent, and is brought up by her father 4-Liu Yao, who works with the ship's colony of plants. While a child, Hsing has a strong negative reaction to a virtual reality recording of a tiger in a zoo, demonstrating her complete separation from the "wild" aspect of the earth, and her rejection of things that do not acknowledge her humanness and individuality. Hsing lives with Yao until midway through her college career, when she moves in with 4-Hiroshi Canaval, whom she marries and by whom she has a child. While still a child, Hsing develops an interest in writing poetry, and in high school shows an aptitude for physics and mathematics, which gets Hiroshi's attention. On entering college, she chooses to pledge chastity rather than let her body's rhythms be controlled by the contraceptive injection. She is among those who choose to live on Hsin Ti Chiu, along with her son, whom Hiroshi names 6-Canaval Alejo.

=== Luis ===
Luis has a mixed racial background, including South American, Japanese, and European heritage. He is also brought up by his father, 4-Nova Ed, a man whose life is described as being centered on his sexual activity, and who differs greatly from the thoughtful and introverted Luis. Luis also has a memorable experience with the virtual reality tapes, although his occurs in adolescence. Luis subverts a program by remaining in a jungle he is supposed to walk through, and just watching the animal life around him. He sees a large spotted cat and is "transfixed" by its elegance and the fact that it simply ignores him. The brief experience with "wildness" and independence from humans, even though it is part of a human-made program, "strangely enriches" his thinking. In college, Luis studies to become a doctor, and also becomes interested in exploring the educational program for future generations. This leads him to uncover the angels' attempts at erasure and propaganda, and to demanding the creation of a committee on religious manipulation. His role as a conciliator following Hiroshi's announcement leads to his election as Chair of the ship's council. Eventually, he also lives on Hsin Ti Chiu.

== Themes ==
=== Ecocriticism and utopia ===
Literature scholar Tonia Payne has written that Paradises Lost is an example of ecocriticism, wherein Le Guin critiques the idea that human beings are separate from their natural environment. The premise of the novella involves human beings who live their entire lives on a ship in interstellar space, and who therefore have to create a new reality for themselves, a notion also explored in Le Guin's short story "Newton's Sleep". The inhabitants of Discovery become unable to relate to representations of Earth. Some, like Hsing and Luis, still try to understand Ti Chiu, keeping in mind their position as part of a continuum of people supposed to colonize a new planet. For others, this new reality takes the form of the religious beliefs of the cult of Bliss. These beliefs are portrayed as an understandable attempt to adjust to the reality of spaceflight. A review by Publishers Weekly identified a similar theme, common to the other stories in the "Birthday of the World" collection, of characters coming to terms with the world in which they live.

The portion of the story set on New Earth challenges the reader to question their own relationship to Earth: Le Guin uses the colonists' ignorance of common words to demonstrate common assumptions. The story's characters go from an environment in which their continued existence was entirely in their control to one where it depended on the wind, the rain and the sun. The colonists have headaches and other ailments because of pollen and other substances in the air, making Luis realize their total dependence on the planet. Le Guin thus points out human beings' dependence on the real planet Earth. After the Discovery departs from New Earth, the story remains with Hsing and Luis on Hsin Ti Chiu, rather than with the ship. According to Payne, this narrative choice indicates that Le Guin sees Hsing and Luis's choice as the correct—albeit more difficult—path to take.

In the belief system of Bliss, the space outside the ship is equated with spiritual and physical danger, evil, and death. The separation that the angels create between themselves and the outside of the ship also becomes a separation from history and the future, and from their own mortality. The story briefly quotes Lao Tzu (referring to him as "Old Long Ears") and suggests that the angels' pursuit of total control over their environment is unwise: it is the "dangerous" planet of New Earth which offers the true possibility of a utopia. According to scholar Everett Hammer, writing in an anthology examining Le Guin's work, Paradises Lost suggests that any attempt to create a utopia while ignoring the history of the people within it is bound to degenerate into a dystopia. Several other works of hers, including "A Wizard of Earthsea", "The Telling" and "Always Coming Home", also suggest that "a healthy future is not possible without an accurately understood past."

=== Religion ===
Religion is a significant theme in Paradises Lost. According to speculative fiction scholar Brian Attebery, the novella was a response to a rise in religious fundamentalism in the U.S. and elsewhere. Le Guin reacted to the tendency within Christian, Islamic, and Hindu fundamentalism to reject scientific thinking and social change, and to use shared beliefs as armor against political pressure. Le Guin said in her introduction to the story that she could not start Paradises Lost until she worked in the religious theme, which in her words "began to entwine itself with the idea of the sealed ship in the dead vacuum of space, like a cocoon, full of transformation, transmutation, invisible life: the pupa body, the winged soul". The adherents of Bliss believe they are part of an eternal voyage towards perfection; its beliefs specifically address phobias that develop in the enclosed space of the ship. Attebery writes that the story serves as a parable for the role of religion on Earth, but that the setting of a generation ship prevents the "parallel from [becoming] too obtrusive." The story also explores why certain characters are resistant to the allure of Bliss; by discussing their background and upbringing, Attebery says, Le Guin "helps us believe in their ability to choose a tough material reality".

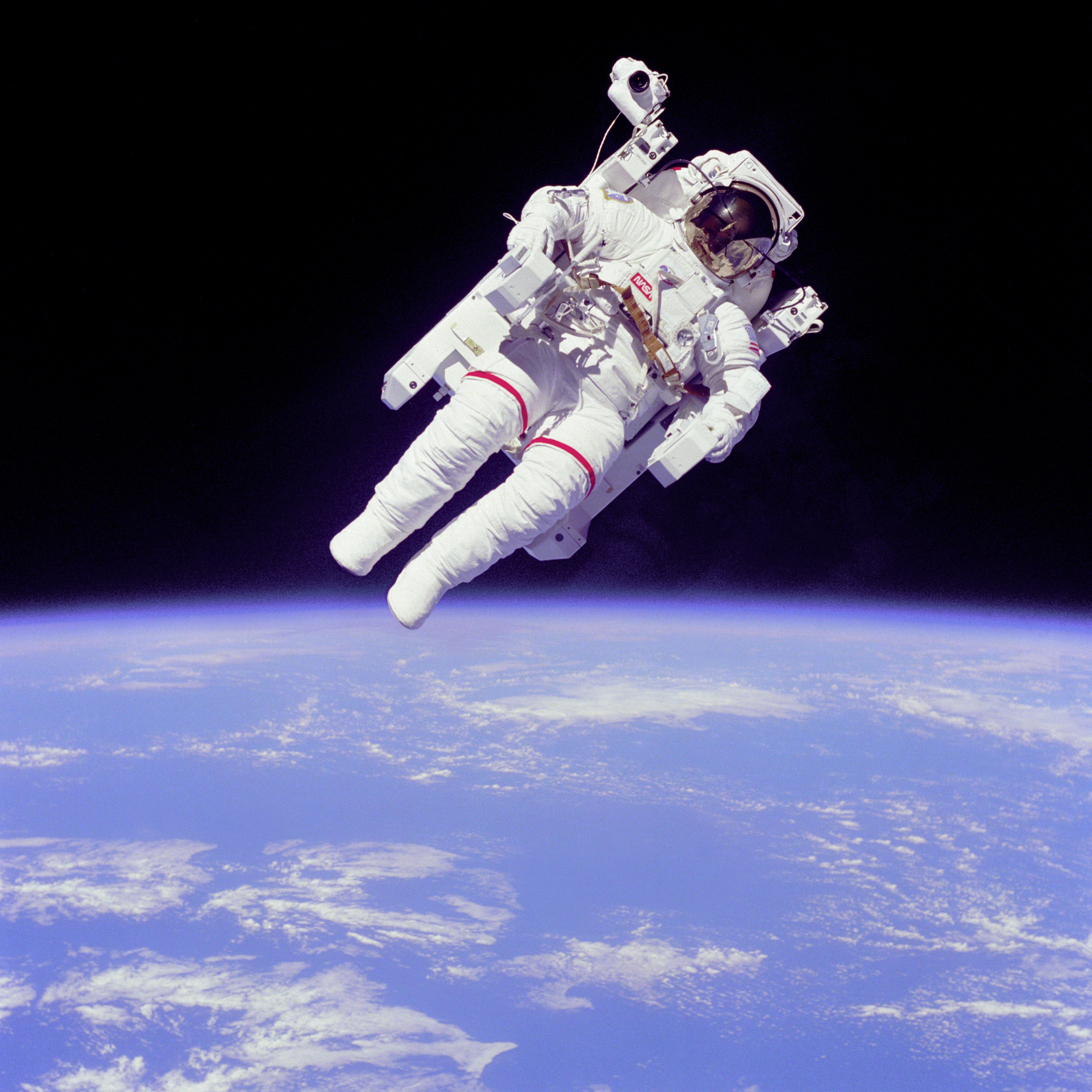
An astronaut performing an EVA. EVA is seen as a transgression associated with death by adherents of Bliss in Paradises Lost.

Literary critic Richard Erlich wrote in 2006 that the depiction of the religious cult of Bliss was influenced by Le Guin's interest in Taoist thought and was an example of Le Guin's critique of Christianity. The angels' use of the phrase "the planetary hypothesis" to refer to their terrestrial origin was a gentle dig at Christian fundamentalism in the United States, with its insistence that evolution is "merely a theory." The story also refers to the success of Christian fundamentalists in taking over school boards in the US. A more direct criticism of Christianity comes in Le Guin's depiction of the cult of Bliss being disrespectful of women, as well as of believing in a nuclear, patriarchal family. Bliss is portrayed as a closed system; members reinforce manipulate the ship's data banks to remove references to Earth and their destination, because they value stability even to the point of denying some of their own knowledge. A reference to Christianity is also present in Le Guin's word to describe activity outside the ship: the real-world term "extravehicular activity" or EVA is used as a single word "Eva," regarding the biblical "Eve": angels in the story see going outside the ship as an act of transgression associated with death.

According to Payne, Le Guin does not explicitly criticize the concept of religion in general, but the tendency within religion to reduce "reality" to that which can be contained and controlled by the human mind. This "control" is only possible within the entire human-made environment aboard the spacecraft, which Le Guin depicts as lacking elements of the "richly textured" real world, and which denies human beings the experiences of "wildness" which make life interesting. In Payne's view, the story challenges the idea, common to Western society, that human beings and technology can solve all problems; it does so by presenting an entire planet as a system not amenable to control. A 2002 review in Salon magazine also highlighted the religious themes in the story, stating that Le Guin offered an unusual take on the theme of religion by depicting a "cult of atheists" fed by the tendency to religious conformity among human beings. Scholar Max Haiven also said that Paradises Lost demonstrated the human need for myth and spirituality, and how power structures could arise even in societies planned intending to avoid them. According to Haiven, the zeroth generation made the mistake of assuming that they could create a completely rational society; instead, the emerging system of religion brought with it coercion and patriarchal standards of behavior.

== Publication and adaptations ==
=== Collections ===
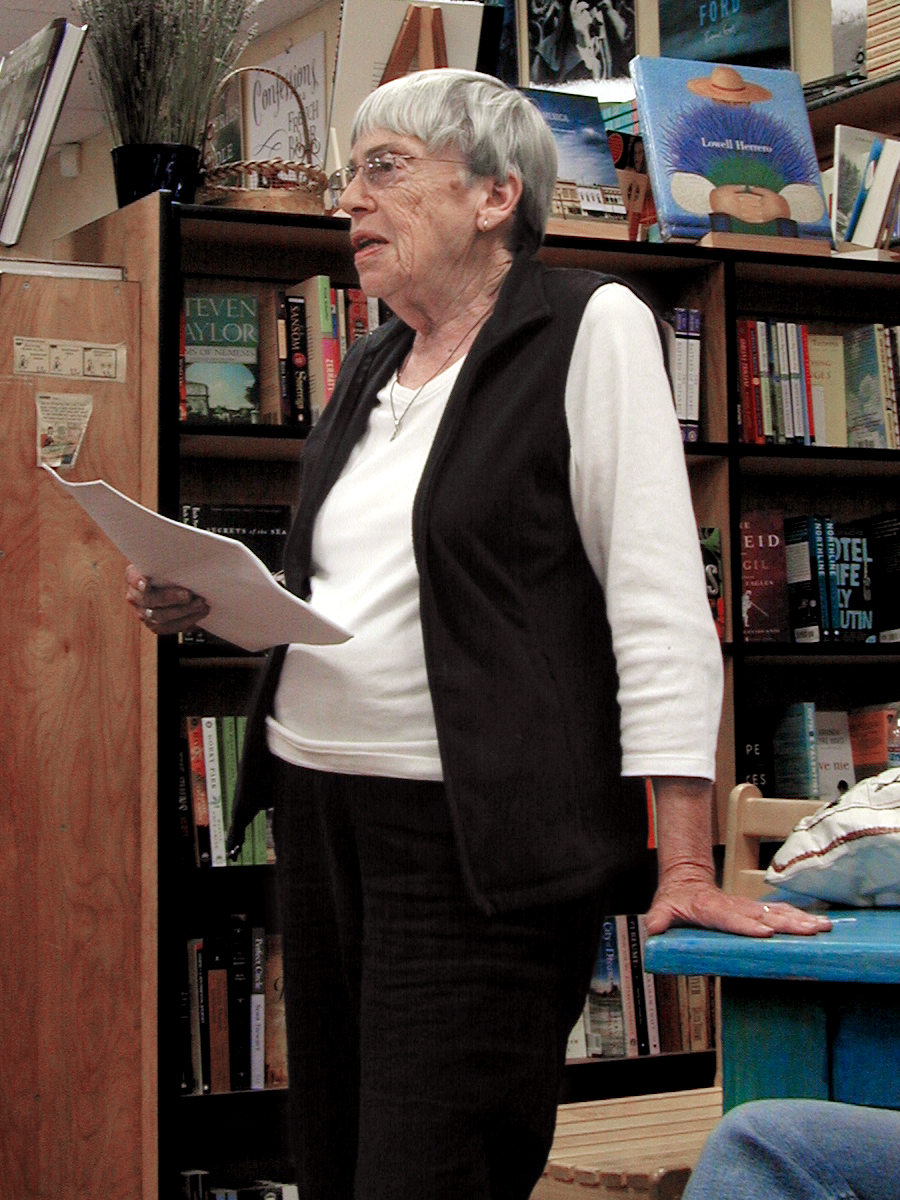
Le Guin, giving a reading in 2008

Paradises Lost was first published as part of the collection The Birthday of the World and Other Stories in 2002, along with seven other stories from the period 1994–2000. Paradises Lost was the only original story in the book: all the others had been previously published elsewhere. According to scholar Sandra Lindow, all the works in the collection (except for "Old Music and the Slave Women") examine unorthodox sexual relationships and marriage; with Paradises Lost, the tightly controlled reproduction of people aboard the ship. Margaret Atwood, however, described the "peculiar arrangements of gender and sexuality" as being restricted to the first seven stories (i.e. excluding Paradises Lost). Haiven wrote that several stories in the collection, including Paradises Lost, "Mountain Ways", and "Old Music and the Slave Women", explored anarchist ideas. In 2016 Paradises Lost was anthologized along with all 12 of Le Guin's other novellas in the volume The Found and the Lost; the other stories in the collection included three novellas from Earthsea, and several stories from the Hainish Cycle. The pieces were arranged approximately by the date of their publication.

=== Opera ===
Paradises Lost was adapted into an opera by the opera program of the University of Illinois. The opera was composed by Stephen A. Taylor; the libretto has been attributed both to Kate Gale and to Marcia Johnson. Adapted in 2005, the opera premiered in 2012. Le Guin described the effort as a "beautiful opera" in an interview and expressed hopes that other producers would pick it up. She also said she was better pleased with stage adaptations, including Paradises Lost, than screen adaptations of her work till date. An essay written for the Poetry Foundation stated that the opera was "so free from history—and even from Earth—as to have its own constraints". The review described the opera as taking place in a quiet setting, unlike the "swashbuckling atmosphere" of most operas, and that as a result it depended more on atmosphere and language to maintain tension. A review of a performance that included excerpts of the opera in Portland, Oregon, stated that Taylor had given the music "rhythmic drive and bright sound, with two sopranos, flute, celesta, metallophone and plenty of pizzicato, that were well suited to the theme of celestial travel." The review said that the vocal melodies soon "took on a sense of sameness that undercut the story's dramatic tension."

== Reception ==
A review of the Birthday of the World volume in Booklist Review commented that Paradises Lost offered a "change of pace" from the rest of the collection, and that in contrast to many other stories, which are set in the Hainish Universe, it "stood well on its own". Suzy Hansen, writing in Salon, said that the novella allowed the reader to imagine designing a part of the world. Hansen said that Paradises Lost allowed "reality architects" to ponder questions such as how to form language, and what environmental constraints shaped human beings. Hansen described the relationship between Hsing and Luis as a "wonderful love story", and also praised the characterization of Bliss as a "remarkable twist on organized religion", saying that the "conflict [made] logical sense". Writing in 2015, Haiven called Paradises Lost a "telling narrative" and described it as a "grim and timely warning" about religious fundamentalism, and its power to shape society. He compared the struggle of the protagonists to that of the anarchist society of The Dispossessed, and said it was "a chastening lesson in both the potential and the perils of freedom, [and] the secret life of authority".

Author and literary critic Margaret Atwood, reviewing the volume for New York Books, wrote that Paradises Lost was a part of the "note of renewal" in Birthday of the World. Atwood stated she found a "release from claustrophobia" because Le Guin offered a choice between a version of "heaven" on board the ship and life on a "dirtball", but took the side of the dirtball. According to Atwood, in doing so, Paradises Lost "shows us our own natural world as a freshly discovered Paradise Regained, a realm of wonder". The novella and the collection end with Hsing and Luis dancing in celebration of "the ordinary dirt that sustains them after they have left the ship," an ending Atwood praised as "minimalist." A review in The Washington Post was more critical, saying that while the story had many "sharp observations and lovely moments", the cult of Bliss did not "possess any imaginative reality". It commented: "Too tidily categorical, the story undermines only its own straw men."

A review of The Found and the Lost in Locus magazine stated that the novella was a "deft" example of the "classic "power chord"" of stories set on generation ships. The review compared the tone and premise of the story with those of science fiction authors Gene Wolfe and Robert A. Heinlein, and said that, as with Le Guin's other works, it explored multiple forms of social stratification. The entire collection received high praise, particularly for the "sheer level of talent and word-wizardry and world-building" in Le Guin's writing, and for taking a "non-dogmatic and fair-minded" approach to politically sensitive subjects. Attebery also suggested Paradises Lost had similarities with the quartet The Book of the Long Sun by Gene Wolfe in its discussion of religion, as well as with the writing of novelist Molly Gloss.

Attebery credited Le Guin, among others, with reviving generation ship stories in the 1990s, but wrote that their authors shifted the emphasis of such stories away from individuals towards exploring communal action and belief. Le Guin wished to focus on the "middle generations" in such stories; those generations that lived out their journey in isolation. According to Attebery, Le Guin could explore these lives because authors before her had written of the beginning and ending of generation ship journeys. A review of The Found and the Lost in the online science fiction magazine Tor.com compared Paradises Lost and "Vaster than Empires and More Slow", stating that while both stories examined the challenges of interstellar travel and the isolation it brought on, the differences between them were "as stark as they are fascinating". It said that Paradises Lost explored isolation in space travel with "compassion and patience", and called the story the "culmination of the collection, [which drew] together the community-building and existential malaise of all the previous stories into a captivating and ambivalent conclusion". Speaking of the entire volume, Tor.com stated that it "[welcomed] readers home to places they've never visited, and making the familiar stranger and stranger still".

== Sources ==
- Attebery, Brian (2013). "Science Fictional Parabolas: Jazz, Geometry, and Generation Starships". In Attebery, Brian; Hollinger, Veronica (eds.). Parabolas of Science Fiction. Wesleyan University Press. pp. 3–23. ISBN 978-0-8195-7366-7.
- Haiven, Max (2015). ""One Who, Choosing, Accepts the Responsibility of Choice": Ursula K. Le Guin, Anarchism, and Authority". In Shantz, Jeff (ed.). Specters of Anarchy: Literature and the Anarchist Imagination. Algora Publishing. pp. 169–200. ISBN 978-1628941418.
- Le Guin, Ursula K. (2002). The Birthday of the World: and Other Stories. HarperCollins. ISBN 978-0-06-621253-1.
- Lindow, Sandra J. (2012). Dancing the Tao: Le Guin and Moral Development. Cambridge Scholars Publishing. ISBN 978-1-4438-4302-7.
- Payne, Tonia L. (2006). ""We are dirt: we are earth" Ursula Le Guin and the problem of Extraterrestrialism". In Gersdorf, Catrin; Mayer, Sylvia (eds.). Nature in Literary and Cultural Studies: Transatlantic Conversations on Ecocriticism. Rodopi. pp. 231–248. ISBN 978-90-420-2096-2.
