= Winter's King =

- Short story by Ursula K. Le Guin
- Country: United States
- Language: English
- Genre: Science fiction

Publication
- Published in: Orbit, volume 5
- Publication type: Anthology
- Publisher: G.P. Putnam's Sons
- Media type: Print
- Publication date: 1969
- Series: Hainish Cycle

"Winter's King" is a science fiction short story by American writer Ursula K. Le Guin, originally published in the September 1969 issue of Orbit, a fiction anthology. The story is part of the Hainish Cycle and explores topics such as the effects on humans of space travel at nearly the speed of light, as well as religious and political topics such as feudalism.

"Winter's King" was one of four nominees for the 1970 Hugo Award for Best Short Story.

Le Guin revised the story, mainly editing the gendered language and pronouns, for its inclusion in her 1975 short story collection The Wind's Twelve Quarters.

== Conception ==
The story takes place on Gethen (also called Winter), the same planet shown in more detail in The Left Hand of Darkness. It was in fact Le Guin's first vision of Gethen:

When I wrote this story, a year before I began the novel The Left Hand of Darkness, I did not know that the inhabitants of the planet Winter or Gethen were androgynes. By the time the story came out in print, I did, but too late to amend such usages as 'son', 'mother', and so on... In revising the story for this edition... I use the feminine pronoun for all Gethenians—while preserving certain masculine titles such as King and Lord, just to remind one of the ambiguity... The androgyny of the characters has little to do with the events of the story.

Winter's King centers on the idea that someone could age only twelve years while the rest of their world ages sixty (itself one of many science fiction stories to address the point made by Albert Einstein: that if he could travel far enough and fast enough he could return and be younger than his own son). Le Guin used a similar idea in the earlier short story Semley's Necklace, later expanded as Rocannon's World. However, Semley's Necklace is structured as a Rip Van Winkle–type fairy tale, where a person goes underground in the company of dwarves or elves, spending an apparently brief time but on emergence finding that whole generations have elapsed. Unlike Semley in the earlier story, Argaven understands the science of what has happened. The focus of Winter's King is more psychological, someone confronting their own child who is now much older than they are.

The story also includes the idea of mind manipulation, which Le Guin used earlier and rather differently in City of Illusions.

== Plot ==
"Winter's King" tells the story of Argaven, ruler of a large kingdom on Gethen, a planet whose inhabitants do not have a fixed sex. Argaven has been kidnapped and her mind apparently altered by political opponents. Fearing what she might unwittingly do under the influence of this brainwashing, she abdicates in favor of her infant child Emran, naming a reliable regent to rule until Emran is old enough. With the help of aliens from distant worlds (who include Earth-humans), she travels to another planet 24 light-years away, using a nearly-as-fast-as-light ship. This means 24 years pass but she is no older. News passes between the planets by means of an instantaneous communicator (ansible), and all seems well.

On this planet (Ollul) she is cured of the mind alterations, which would have made her a paranoid tyrant had she tried to carry on. There Argaven lives and studies for 12 years, learning about the wider society of many planets and about people with two fixed sexes, very alien to her.

Argaven then learns that things are going badly on Gethen and is persuaded to return home in a sub-lightspeed voyage which takes another 24 years. Sixty years have passed on Gethen since she last was there: her child is now old and has become a tyrant. Public opinion is with Argaven and she is restored to the throne, with Emran committing suicide.

The story ends there. But the 1995 short story "Coming of Age in Karhide" (which appeared in a collection called The Birthday of the World) mentions in passing the first and second reigns of Argaven, saying little but indicating that the second reign was a success.

== Literary significance and criticism ==
Charlotte Spivack points out that the story's winter theme precedes and produces the story's androgyny theme.

Susan Wood deems the story notable because of its scientific extrapolation of topics such as sub-lightspeed travel and alien biology, topics which "provide a framework for powerful psychological studies."

A review of The Wind's Twelve Quarters in the Toronto Star had particular praise for "Winter's King". Calling attention to Le Guin's decision to revise the story from its original publication and use female pronouns throughout for her androgynous characters, the reviewer wrote that Le Guin had "[created] a profoundly disconcerting fiction".

== Sources ==
- Bloom, Harold, ed. (1986). Ursula K. Le Guin (1st ed.). New York, NY: Chelsea House. ISBN 0-87754-659-2.
- Cadden, Mike (2005). Ursula K. Le Guin Beyond Genre: Fiction for Children and Adults (1st ed.). New York, NY: Routledge. ISBN 0-415-99527-2.
- Le Guin, Ursula (1975). The Wind's Twelve Quarters (1st ed.). New York, NY: Harper & Row. ISBN 0-06-012562-4.
- Spivack, Charlotte (1984). Ursula K. Le Guin (1st ed.). Boston, MA: Twayne Publishers. ISBN 0-8057-7393-2.
