= Man of the People =

Man of the People may refer to:

- A politician, in reference to a politician's job to represent the people
- A populist, who promotes the interests of the common people above the elites'
- "Man of the People" (Star Trek: The Next Generation), an episode from the sixth season of Star Trek: The Next Generation
- A Man of the People, a novel by Chinua Achebe
- "A Man of the People" (short story), a short story by Ursula K. Le Guin
- "Man of the People", a 2021 song by Steven Wilson from The Future Bites
- Man of the People (TV series), a 1991 television series starring James Garner
- Man of the People (film), a 1937 film directed by Edwin L. Marin
