= The Shobies' Story =

- Short story by Ursula K. Le Guin
- Cover of audiotape version; artwork by Robert Daniels, Jr.
- Country: United States
- Language: English
- Genre: Science fiction

Publication
- Published in: Universe 1
- Publication type: Anthology
- Publisher: Broadway (AudioText, Inc. for shown image)
- Media type: Print (Audiotape for shown image)
- Publication date: March 1, 1990 (1996 for shown image)
- Series: Hainish Cycle

"The Shobies' Story" is a 1990 science fiction novella by American writer Ursula K. Le Guin, describing the story of the first human crew to participate in a newly invented faster-than-light mode of space travel, using the Churten Theory developed by Anarresti physicists after Shevek in The Dispossessed. It was first published in the anthology Universe 1 and subsequently appeared in A Fisherman of the Inland Sea published by Harper Prism in 1994.

The crew forms a miniature society in which each member must participate in creating a cohesive group narrative to alter the nature of reality, which causes the travel. "The Shobies' Story" is notable because Le Guin replaces the traditional militaristic and hierarchical chain of command used in traditional space travel with voluntary consensus.

"The Shobies' Story" was nominated for a Nebula Award in the novelette category in 1991.

== Plot summary ==
A starship crew faces the physical and psychic effects of traveling faster than light from Hain, the Prime World, the source of the oldest culture and most intelligent life among the planetary group called the Ekumen. Their entire journey, including time-travel, lasts only forty-four minutes.

The crew calls themselves the Shobies after their ship's name, Shoby. The crews' ritual is gathering around a campfire to discuss the Churten theory and to tell stories that will bond them together. As a space crew, they operate by consensual decision using transilience rather than by chain of command. Transilience is the experience of entering the fiction world by way of the imagination. Their equipment that facilitates transilience stops functioning and they cannot agree on what they perceive. They start to lose their social cohesion and in order for the Shobies to tell their story, they must establish themselves with relation to time.

The cover shown with this article is misleading: everyone is human. But the low-tech and cultural implications are accurate.

== Style ==
"The Shobies' Story" can be classified as a realistic story in the sense that anyone can place themselves in the story or the events that take place. The short story can correlate to real life by the family values of the characters. Le Guin also shows cultures coming together to work and live in overcoming the struggles the crew faces. There is also a realistic way Le Guin lets one see how the characters perceive others and their events. In the real world people perceive events differently and believe them to be true as others perceive the same events differently and also believe them to be true.

== Themes ==
"The Shobies' Story" touches on themes such as interstellar travel, time dilation, cultural dominance, and perceptions of reality. "The Shobies' Story" is based on a crew of ten people traveling to test in an experiment whether transilience may be an element or agent of transilience. Culture is a factor since the crew members originate from different planets. Tai, Betton, Lidi, and Shan are from Terra; Oreth, Karth, Asten, and Rig are from Gethen; Gveter is from Anarres; and Sweet Today is Hainish-chiffewarian. There is a cultural dominance in the sense that each one believes they know what is best for the crew members aboard the ship. Another theme of the story deals with time dilation and how long the trip will take and when or if the Shoby ship will return to Ve in seventeen years. The story mostly deals with perception or how the characters take in the events that occur. Different characters perceive different events, like when Rig (a child) sees a brown planet and Asten (another child) doesn't see it.

== Characters ==
Asten: Six years old; child of Oreth and Karth.

Betton: Son of Tai. From Terra. Eleven years old.

Gveter: He has more recent information and presumably a better understanding about their mission than the others, but it has to be pried out of him. Only twenty-five, the only Cetian in the crew, much hairier then the others, and not gifted in language, he spends a lot of time on the defensive. He often lectures the others about their propertarian habits; but he clings steadfastly to his knowledge, because he needs the advantage it gives him. For a while he speaks only in negatives and outdebates the others using his knowledge of certain physico-philosophico-techo-matter. He is from Anarres and has a notable accent. Gveter has a mane on his head, a pelt on his limbs and body, fuzz on his feet and a silvery nimbus (of hair) on his hands and face.

Karth: Gethenian; father of Asten and mother of Rig.

Oreth: Gethenian; risk taker; mother of Asten and father of Rig. They left Terra when they were eighteen.

Rig: Four years old; child of Oreth and Karth.

Shan: Offers Betton fatherly-brotherly warmth, but he sought no formal crew relation with him or anyone. Also from Terra Shan is dark in appearance and an elegant dancer. He is interested in Tai, but she is non-responsive. Although friendly he can be controlling, and is the protagonist in the sequel Dancing to Ganam.

Sweet Today: A tall, heavy, Hainish woman in her late fifties, described as having a slow, calm voice. She is asked to be Grandmother to Rig, Asten, and Betton, and accepts. As Hainish is the crew's lingua franca, she serves as the ship's comptroller.

Tai: Parent of Betton. From Terra. Does not like to be touched.

Lidi: A Terran; seventy-two Earth-years old and not interested in grandmothering. Lidi had been navigating for fifty years, and there is nothing she doesn't know about NAFAL (nearly as fast as light) ships, although occasionally she forgets that their ship is the Shoby and calls it the Soso or the Alterra. She has spent her career staying away from Terra.
