= A Man of the People (short story) =

Science fiction short story by Ursula K. Le Guin

- Short story by Ursula K. Le Guin
- Country: United States
- Language: English
- Genre(s): Science fiction

Publication
- Published in: Four Ways to Forgiveness
- Publisher: HarperPrism
- Media type: Print (hardcover and paperback)
- Publication date: 1995
- Series: The Hainish Cycle

"A Man of the People" is one of four connected short stories in Ursula K. Le Guin's Four Ways to Forgiveness. It details the early life, training with the Ekumenical Envoy service, and activities on Yeowe and Werel of Mattinyehedarheddyuragamuruskets Havzhiva, nicknamed "Zhiv", a native of the planet Hain. It contains Le Guin's most extensive description of Hain's environment and culture in her work.

The history of the Hainish people goes back three million years, and they placed colonies on many planets, including Earth and Werel. In the course of this long history civilization has risen and fallen many times, including settlement and terraforming of Ve, another planet in the Hain system.

No human mind could encompass the history of Hain: three million years of it. The events of the first two million years, the Fore-Eras, like layers of metamorphic rock, were so compressed, so distorted by the weight of the succeeding millennia and their infinite events that one could reconstruct only the most sweeping generalizations from the tiny surviving details. And if one did chance to find some miraculously preserved document from a thousand millennia ago, what then? A king ruled in Azbahan; the Empire fell to the Infidels; a fusion rocket has landed on Ve .... But there had been uncountable kings, empires, inventions, billions of lives lived in millions of countries, monarchies, democracies, oligarchies, anarchies, ages of chaos and ages of order, pantheon upon pantheon of gods, infinite wars and times of peace, incessant discoveries and forgettings, innumerable horrors and triumphs, an endless repetition of unceasing novelty. What is the use of trying to describe the flowing of a river at any one moment, and then at the next moment, and then at the next, and the next, and the next? You wear out...

In the time period when the story is set, the Hainish have recontacted their former colonies using Nearly-as-fast-as-light (NAFAL) starships and formed an association of worlds known as the Ekumen. However, the planet's population is divided into two broad groups, the "historians" of the "temples" who have contact with off-worlders and study the planet's past, and the residents of the "pueblos", who use a simple technology and are largely indifferent to the remnants around them:

Stse is an almost-island, separated from the mainland of the great south continent by marshes and tidal bogs, where millions of wading birds gather to mate and nest. Ruins of an enormous bridge are visible on the landward side, and another half-sunk fragment of ruin is the basis of the town's boat pier and breakwater. Vast works of other ages encumber all Hain, and are no more and no less venerable or interesting to the Hainish than the rest of the landscape.

Zhiv begins life as a pueblo-dweller but follows a lover to the temple society and thence into Ekumenical service.
