= Four Ways to Forgiveness =

1995 collection of short stories and novellas by Ursula K. Le Guin

- Cover of the first edition
- Author: Ursula K. Le Guin
- Language: English
- Genre: Science fiction
- Publisher: HarperCollins
- Publication date: 1995
- Publication place: United States
- Media type: Print (hardback & paperback)
- Pages: 228
- ISBN: 0-06-105234-5
- OCLC: 32167377
- Dewey Decimal: 813/.54 20
- LC Class: PS3562.E42 F68 1995
- Preceded by: The Dispossessed
- Followed by: The Telling

Four Ways to Forgiveness is a collection of four novellas by American writer Ursula K. Le Guin. All four stories are set in the future and deal with the planets Yeowe and Werel, both members of the Ekumen, a collective of planets used by Le Guin as part of the background for many novels and short stories in her Hainish Cycle. In 2017, the collection was reissued in the second volume of Hainish Novels & Stories and as an e-book, augmented with a fifth related story by Le Guin, as Five Ways to Forgiveness.

== Setting ==
The stories in the book are set on two planets, Werel and Yeowe, in a distant solar system; the planets are inhabited by humans placed there by the ancient Hainish people. (This 'Werel' is not the same as the world called Werel in Le Guin's novels Planet of Exile and City of Illusions.) Werel has a long history of institutional enslavement of its lighter-skinned ethnic groups by its darker-skinned ethnic groups. (The latter's derogatory term for the former is "dusties".) When the Ekumen recontacted the Werelians, the shock spurred one of the Werelian nations, Voe Deo, to develop a space program and settle the other inhabitable planet in the system, Yeowe, transporting a primarily slave population to do so. Eventually, the slaves on Yeowe conducted a successful revolt and gained independence, an event that occurred in the fairly recent past of the four stories. The nations of Werel are nervous that the "assets" on that planet might attempt a similar uprising.

== Contents ==
1. "Betrayals" – The story of Yoss, an elderly, retired science teacher who lived through Yeowe's War of Liberation, and her neighbour Chief Abberkam, a disgraced leader from that war and an opponent of contact with the Ekumen, both living in a desolate area of the planet. Abberkam rescues Yoss's pet cat from an accidental fire which destroys her hut; Yoss then moves into Abberkam's house.
2. "Forgiveness Day" – Solly, a woman of half-Terran ancestry and space-travelling parents, faces problems as Envoy to the small, sexually repressive kingdom of Gatay on Werel.
3. "A Man of the People" – Havzhiva is a man who grows up on Hain, is educated there and then works for the Hainish embassy on Yeowe. The story contains the most extensive description of Hain's environment and culture in Le Guin's work.
4. "A Woman's Liberation" – Rakam, a woman born as a slave on Werel, tells of her life and her growing self-awareness. Also published in the anthology A Woman's Liberation: A Choice of Futures By and About Women (2001).
5. "Old Music and the Slave Women" focuses on Esdardon Aya, also known as 'Old Music'. It is set somewhat later in time than the other four stories. Le Guin writes, "the character called Old Music began to tell me a fifth tale about the latter days of the civil war . . . I’m glad to see it joined to the others at last."

The last story, "Old Music and the Slave Women", appears only in the volume Five Ways to Forgiveness, but not in Four Ways to Forgiveness. That story was also published earlier, in the collection The Birthday of the World.

The book ends with "Notes on Werel and Yeowe", which provides details of the two planets and their solar system.

The second, third, fourth, and fifth stories have some characters in common. Havzhiva, who was originally introduced in "A Man of the People", works for Solly from "Forgiveness Day". He is also the lover of Rakam in "A Woman's Liberation", who is mentioned but not named in "A Man of the People". Both of them know Dr. Yeron and also Esdardon Aya (called "Old Music"), who is a minor character in "Forgiveness Day" and the protagonist in Old Music and the Slave Women.

== Themes ==
The common themes of the stories revolve around the concepts of freedom and slavery. For thousands of years, the dark-skinned "owners" of Werel held the light-skinned "assets" in slavery. However, in recent years, following the colonization of the second planet, Yeowe, the situation has begun to change on Werel. The Yeowans have gained freedom and are struggling to establish their own government and identity, as well as gain admittance into the Ekumen collective of worlds.

Gender relations are another area examined by the stories. In Yeowe's initial years of settlement, only male slaves were transported to the planet, leading to a hypermasculine culture and formalized homosexual relationships, both of which had a strong impact on later gender relations on the planet. In the second story of the book, Solly associates with a Werelian member of a class of traditional transvestite entertainers; the fourth story features Rakam reflecting on how her new experience of freedom from formal slavery is conditioned by her position as a woman in a sexist society.

== Publication history ==
The collection was first published by Harper Paperbacks (a division of HarperCollins Publishers) in 1995. "Betrayals" first appeared in 1994 in Blue Motel. The other stories appeared in the science fiction magazine Asimov's in 1994 and 1995.

Four Ways to Forgiveness was published in 1995 in a leather-bound, signed edition by Easton Press.

Five Ways to Forgiveness was first published in 2017 as a Library of America eBook Classic. The Library of America included Five Ways to Forgiveness in the collection Hainish Novels & Stories, Volume Two as well.

== Reception and critical analysis ==
Four Ways to Forgiveness has been referred to as a story-suite by critics, based on Le Guin's own use of the term to describe her deliberate inclusion of linked short stories in book form. Le Guin has remarked that the collections of stories could have been a novel had she focused on a few characters; instead she decided to focus on a work with many voices.

The collection won the Locus Award for Best Collection in 1996.
