= The Birthday of the World and Other Stories =

2002 collection of short fiction by Ursula K. Le Guin

- First edition
- Author: Ursula K. Le Guin
- Language: English
- Genre: Science fiction
- Publisher: HarperCollins
- Publication date: March 2002
- Publication place: United States
- Media type: Print (hardcover)
- Pages: 362 pp
- ISBN: 0-06-621253-7
- OCLC: 47642973

The Birthday of the World and Other Stories is a collection of short fiction by American writer Ursula K. Le Guin, first published in March 2002 by HarperCollins. Each of the stories, except "Paradises Lost", had previously been published elsewhere. The title story was the most recently published, in 2000. Only these two stories are not set on planets of the Ekumen league.

The collection was also published in London by Gollancz (an imprint of the Orion Group) in 2003. A softcover edition was published by Perennial that same year.

== Contents ==
- Foreword
- "Coming of Age in Karhide" – 1995 in New Legends ed. G. Bear. Takes place on Gethen the planet of The Left Hand of Darkness which is part of the Ekumen. In the society of Karhide, where people are naturally hermaphroditic and only become male or female during a heat-like period called "kemmer", an adolescent matures and loses their virginity.
- "The Matter of Seggri" – Spring 1994 in Crank!. Takes place on Seggri of the Ekumen. The discovery, exploration, and ultimate alteration of a planet characterised by extreme gender imbalance and segregation.
- "Unchosen Love" – Fall 1994 in Amazing Stories. Takes place on O of the Ekumen which is the same planet as the title story of A Fisherman of the Inland Sea. Society there is built around the sedoretu – a marriage involving four people. The story is about a meek man and meek woman, who are in relationships with a strong-willed man and woman respectively. The meek find solace in each other's company, an unexpected relationship catalyzed by mysterious encounters.
- "Mountain Ways" – August 1996 in Asimov's Science Fiction. Also set on O, it deals with two women who are in love, but who cannot find suitable partners to establish a sedoretu, decide to deceive the other parties to a marriage by disguising one of the women as a man. The story is part of her Hainish Cycle books.
- "Solitude" – December 1994 in The Magazine of Fantasy and Science Fiction. Takes place on Eleven-Soro on the fringes of the Ekumen. Society has fragmented – men and women live apart, and adult women do not even enter each other's houses. The story is told by the daughter of a mobile of the Ekumen who grows up in this society.
- "Old Music and the Slave Women" – 1999 in Far Horizons ed. R. Silverberg. Another story in the same dual-planet system of Werel and Yeowe as Four Ways to Forgiveness of the Ekumen. Set later in time than the stories in that volume, when the "assets" of Voe Deo on Werel are fighting a war to gain freedom from the "owners".
- "The Birthday of the World" – June 2000 in The Magazine of Fantasy and Science Fiction. The story depicts a society where the hereditary rulers are "God", and how the society is disrupted from inside and outside. The situation has parallels to that of Incan civilization and the coming of the Europeans.
- "Paradises Lost" – First publication. Not part of the Ekumen series, it is a story of a group of humans undertaking a journey to a distant planet to discover the possibilities of habitability. The journey takes several generations, and is told from the perspective of people that have grown up aboard the ship and its unique society, having known only the ship.
