= Old Music and the Slave Women =

Short story by Ursula K. Le Guin

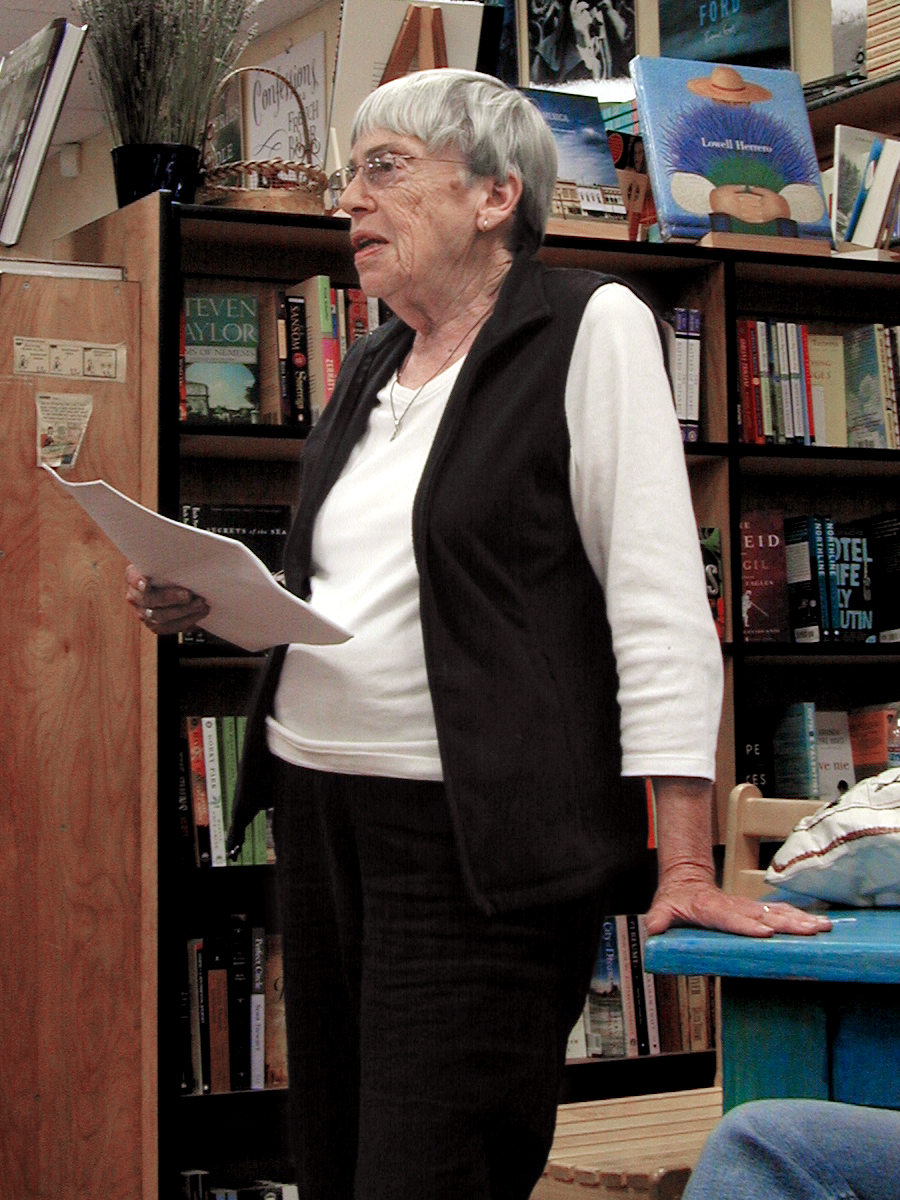
Ursula K. Le Guin in 2008

"Old Music and the Slave Women" is a science fiction story by Ursula K. Le Guin. It was first published in the 1999 collection Far Horizons, edited by Robert Silverberg, and anthologized multiple times in collections of Le Guin's works. The story is set on the planet of Werel in the fictional Hainish universe, created by Le Guin. That planetary system is also the setting for Le Guin's 1995 story suite Four Ways to Forgiveness. The economy of Werel is based on slavery, and during the period in which the stories are set, the society is experiencing upheaval and revolution.

"Old Music and the Slave Women" tells the story of Sohikelwenyanmurkeres Esdan, a native of Hain, nicknamed "Old Music", who appears as a peripheral character in three of the previous stories set in that system. Fed up with a civil war on Werel which has trapped him in the embassy of the Ekumen, he leaves to meet with the leaders of the revolution, but is captured and taken to an old slave estate. There, he is tortured by government agents, and befriends the few women slaves who remain.

As with the stories of the linked story suite, "Old Music and the Slave Women" examines themes related to revolution and reconstruction in slave society. It explores the consequences of war and responses to violence, and suggests that cultural change is a gradual process. The story was positively received. While the length of the story received some criticism, reviewers praised the character of Esdan and Le Guin's depiction of the culture of Werel, with one critic describing it as "painfully real, at once beautiful and deplorable."

== Setting ==
"Old Music and the Slave Women" takes place in the fictional Hainish universe, created by Le Guin. In the alternative history of this universe, human beings did not evolve on Earth, but on Hain. The people of Hain colonized many neighboring planetary systems, including Earth and Gethen, possibly a million years before the setting of the novels. "Old Music and the Slave Women" is set in a planetary system that includes two habitable planets, Werel and Yeowe, (Note: The fictional planet Werel featured in this story is different from the planet Werel used by Le Guin as the setting for her novel Planet of Exile.) which were also the setting for Le Guin's 1995 story cycle Four Ways to Forgiveness. The economy of the system was based on slavery, and is depicted as undergoing upheaval and revolution during the period in which the stories are set.

The story follows Sohikelwenyanmurkeres Esdan, a native of Hain, nicknamed "Esdardon Aya", or "Old Music" in the local language. Esdardon Aya appears as a character in three of the four stories in Four Ways to Forgiveness. By the events of "Old Music and the Slave Women", he has lived on Werel for 33 years. "Old Music and the Slave Women" is set after the four previous stories in the internal chronology of the universe, and tells of a civil war on Werel. Slavery is permitted on the lands held by the government, and seven eighths of the population is enslaved. "Old Music and the Slave Women" takes place three years after an uprising of slaves takes place. Le Guin stated that the story was inspired by a visit to a large plantation in Charleston, South Carolina, that had used slave labor. The garden, house, and haunted ground in the story were inspired by what Le Guin referred to as a "beautiful, terrible place."

== Plot summary ==
Sohikelwenyanmurkeres Esdan serves as the chief of intelligence for the embassy of the Ekumen to Werel. During a civil war on the planet, the government cuts the embassy off from access to the outside world. Esdan is clandestinely approached by messengers of the rebellion, asking officials of the Ekumen to visit them. Esdan, bored by his isolation, volunteers to make the journey across the government lines. He is intercepted by government forces as he attempts to cross into rebel territory, roughed up, and imprisoned on a large slave estate, where he is tortured. He is nursed by an elderly woman slave, and his injuries later treated by another, named Gana. Rayaye, a minister of the government visits him, and offers him his freedom if he helps the government in the civil war.

Recovering from his injuries, Esdan is permitted to wander the gardens of the estate, which remind him of his home on Hain. He makes the acquaintance of Kamsa, a slave woman who has a son from being raped by an owner. He speaks with Rayaye again, and guesses that the war is going badly for the government. Rayaye tells him that the government is considering the use of a biological weapon to end the conflict, and that it wants the consent of the Ekumen to do so. After Rayaye leaves again, Esdan is locked indoors, leading him to guess that the liberation army of the slave rebellion is close. Later that day he hears sounds of fighting, and is released from his room by members of the liberation army, who have stormed the estate and killed the government soldiers holding it. He is cross-examined by the men who released him; he tells them that the government wanted him to express support for it on behalf of the Ekumen.

The rebel officers tell him that they want him to warn the government not to use the biological weapon, and that if it did the Ekumen would send troops against the government. Esdan informs them that the Ekumen does not have an army, and even if it did it would take many years to arrive, due to the interstellar distances involved. He worries that he may be caught up in a factional struggle within the liberation army. Esdan tries to persuade the officers to care for the slaves still in the estate, including the ones who cared for him. A rebel marshal, Metoy, promises to care for the slaves. Another of the rebel officers later demands that Esdan threaten the government on behalf of the rebels. Esdan replies that he considers himself a prisoner of war. That night, when Kamsa brings Esdan food, fighting breaks out outside the building. Kamsa leads Esdan to a bolthole where the other household slaves are also hiding.

After waiting there for many hours, Esdan leaves their shelter and returns to the house, which he finds has been bombed. He comes across some slaves who work the fields, who tell him that everyone who was in the house is dead, but for one. Metoy has been seriously injured but is still alive. Most of the slaves leave the compound to try and reach the liberation army sooner. The slaves from the house remain, afraid to undertake a journey with a baby. Esdan and Metoy remain with them, expecting the rebellion to reach them too.

== Themes ==
"Old Music and the Slave Women" shares both characters and thematic links with the stories of Four Ways to Forgiveness, which together describe revolution and reconstruction in slave society. Le Guin herself described the story as a "fifth way to forgiveness". The torture undergone by Esdan is similar to the experiences of Solly in "Forgiveness Day", the first story of Four Ways to Forgiveness. Both their experiences bring them a better understanding of themselves and those around them. Esdan's development over the course of the story is similar to that of Havzhiva in "A Man of the People". Both protagonists undergo journeys through the "wilderness" over the course of the story; in Esdan's case, the wilderness is a planet he has lived on for a long while, that has been torn apart by war. As with Havzhiva, the isolation caused by this journey helps him find companionship among the people he meets.

The 2016 Le Guin collection The Found and the Lost included three of the four stories from Four Ways to Forgiveness alongside "Old Music and the Slave Women". Tor.com described the four stories, clustered in the middle of the volume, as focusing on "different experience[s] of a crumbling society", and as the "collection's clearest instance of Le Guin’s ongoing literary project of intersectional justice". Scholar Warren Rochelle states that the five interconnected stories set on Werel and Yeowe describe a society that has the potential to build a "truly human community", and the possibility of utopia. This is made possible by the Ekumen's recognition of the slaves as human beings, thus offering them the prospect of freedom. Rochelle argues that "Old Music and the Slave Women" juxtaposes two ideas of utopia. For the slaves, utopia is freedom, the possibility of which is brought about by the revolution. For the masters, utopia is represented by the estate as it used to be, run by thousands of slaves: Rochelle compares this concept of utopia to the fictional titular city of Le Guin's fable "The Ones Who Walk Away from Omelas".

According to scholar Mike Cadden, silence is a recurring theme in the story. "Old Music and the Slave Women" begins with Esdan being cut off inside the embassy. When he attempts to escape in order to refute propaganda that the Ekumen has taken the side of the government, he is captured, and in captivity realizes that his safety lies in silence and circumspection. The torture he undergoes is not meant to force him to reveal information, but to "silence him further through humiliation". Cadden writes that Esdan eventually finds a sense of community among the slaves, who are also victims of the war. Cadden described the story as sharing similarities with Le Guin's works set in Orsinia.

Scholar Sandra Lindow writes that "Old Music and the Slave Women" continued Le Guin's exploration of peaceful responses to violence and war. Through the story Le Guin suggests that during times of violence no one is immune to it, such as when Esdan states that "In war everybody is a prisoner". Lindow describes Esdan as Le Guin's "wisest, most compassionate protagonist." His insight into the deprivation experienced by the slave women also gives him insight into the process of cultural change. He realizes that he has to put aside his "pure idea of liberty" and take part in a slow process of shifting individual opinions to create cultural change. In his words, he seeks to "muddle the nobly simple structure of the hierarchy of caste by infecting it with the idea of justice. And then to confuse the nobly simple structure of the ideal of human equality by trying to make it real."

As with many other works by Le Guin, "Old Music and the Slave Women" has been described as demonstrating the influence of Taoism on Le Guin's work. Scholar Alexis Lothian wrote that in Le Guin's world, social change was a gradual process: despite the slave revolution, the ideology of the slave-owners was still a powerful force. Though the slaves wait for utopia in the form of the freedom brought by the revolution, they find that they are caught in the "insanity, the stupidity, the meaningless brutality" of the actual liberation. Le Guin instead suggests that utopia or liberation is found equally in the small acts of kindness and comfort which Esdan and the slave women share. Thus according to Rochelle, Le Guin's version of true community "is one of the heart, in which each person’s story is honoured."

== Publication and reception ==
"Old Music and the Slave Women" was first published in the 1999 collection Far Horizons, edited by Robert Silverberg, and published by Avon Eos. It was later collected along with five other stories of the Hainish Cycle, the short story "The Birthday of the World" (Note: Le Guin has stated that this story may or may not be a part of the Hainish Cycle.) and the novella Paradises Lost in the 2002 collection The Birthday of the World and Other Stories, published by HarperCollins. In 2016 it was published in the collection The Found and the Lost, along with twelve other stories by Le Guin. The volume was marketed as "The Collected Novellas of Ursula K. Le Guin." Penguin Random House published Five Ways to Forgiveness, a collection including the "Old Music and the Slave Women" and the four stories from Four Ways to Forgiveness, as an eBook in 2017.

In the foreword to The Birthday of the World collection, Le Guin stated that she had been the subject of a critic's scorn for writing about slavery; in response, Le Guin asked "I wonder what planet he lives on?" Reviewing The Birthday of the World collection for the New York Review of Books, Canadian author Margaret Atwood wrote that the setting and inspiration of "Old Music and the Slave Women" brought it "very close to home". Atwood stated that this story provided the strongest demonstration of Le Guin's belief that science fiction reflects the real world; according to Atwood, the story could have reflected any society in the midst of war. Referring to Le Guin as usually being a "a movingly lyrical writer", Atwood stated that the story didn't "[shy] away from necessary gore".

Reviewing Far Horizons for the Washington Post, Richard Grant was more circumspect about the story, stating "readers unfamiliar with [Le Guin's] oeuvre" may not have found the story "easily approachable." The science fiction magazine Strange Horizons stated that "Old Music and the Slave Women" was a "middling" Le Guin story, which made it a "fine [work] by most authors' standards." A review of The Found and the Lost in the science fiction magazine Tor.com offered high praise to the collection, stating that it found "Le Guin at her most formidable." It praised the four stories set on Werel in particular, stating that the "richness of the culture Le Guin depicts is painfully real, at once beautiful and deplorable." The review concluded that Le Guin's "ability to make not only her outsider-protagonists at home in this degraded world, but her "enlightened" readers, is a feat that should not be overlooked."

Science fiction critic John Clute wrote that the story was less substantive than some of the other works of the Birthday of the World collection, saying that it occupied "radically more space than it needed". He suggested that there was a "surfeit of sentences" that did not move the story forward, and referred to them as a "flag of inattention". He was more positive about Le Guin's writing, stating that Esdan was a "wise and deeply attractive man" and the culture of the slaves was "acutely anatomized", while "every sentence is balanced, [and] laid out with high inconspicuous craft". He wrote that the "astonishing beauty" of the slave estate depicted by Le Guin raised "pertinent issues about the creation of great beauty out of great evil."

== Sources ==
- Cummins, Elizabeth (1990). Understanding Ursula K. Le Guin. Columbia, South Carolina: University of South Carolina Press. ISBN 978-0-87249-687-3.
- Cadden, Mike (2005). Ursula K. Le Guin Beyond Genre: Fiction for Children and Adults. New York City, New York: Routledge. ISBN 0-415-99527-2.
- Le Guin, Ursula K. (2002). The Birthday of the World and Other Stories. New York City, New York: HarperCollins. ISBN 0-06-008535-5.
- Lothian, Alexis (2006). "Grinding Axes and Balancing Oppositions: The Transformation of Feminisms in Ursula K. Le Guin's Science Fiction". Extrapolation. 47 (3): 380–395. doi:10.3828/extr.2006.47.3.4.
- Rochelle, Warren (2001). Communities of the Heart: The Rhetoric of Myth in the Fiction of Ursula K. Le Guin. Liverpool: Liverpool University Press. ISBN 978-0-85323-876-8.
