= The Telling =

2000 novel by Ursula K. Le Guin

- First Edition Hardback Cover
- Author: Ursula K. Le Guin
- Illustrator: Victor Stabin
- Language: English
- Genre: Science fiction
- Published: 2000 (Harcourt)
- Publication place: United States
- Media type: Print (hardback & paperback)
- Pages: 264
- Awards: Locus Award for Best Science Fiction Novel (2001)
- ISBN: 0-15-100567-2
- OCLC: 43662164
- Dewey Decimal: 813/.54 21
- LC Class: PS3562.E42 T45 2000
- Preceded by: Four Ways to Forgiveness

The Telling is a 2000 science fiction novel by Ursula K. Le Guin set in her fictional universe of Hainish Cycle. The Telling is Le Guin's first full follow-up novel set in the Hainish Cycle since her novel The Dispossessed (1995's Four Ways to Forgiveness comprising four short novellas). It tells the story of Sutty, a Terran sent to be an Ekumen observer, on the planet Aka, and her experiences of political and religious conflicts between a corporatist government and the indigenous resistance, which is centered on the traditions of storytelling, locally referred to as "the Telling" (for which the book is named).

== Plot summary ==
Sutty is a woman who travels from Earth to the planet Aka to provide observations as an outside observer. On Aka, all traditional customs and beliefs have been outlawed by the state. Sutty experiences and tells of the conflicts there between the repressive state capitalist government, and the native people who resist.

== Historical parallels ==
Le Guin constructed the recent historical situation of Aka as a parallel to the history of China during the Great Leap Forward and Cultural Revolution. The practice of the Telling is analogous to Taoist and Hindu practices and philosophy, and its suppression to the suppression of religious practices by the Chinese government at the time.

== Publication history ==
The Telling was published in 2000 as part of the Signed First Editions of Science Fiction series by Easton Press, who describe themselves as releasing 'works of lasting meaning, beauty and importance.'

== Reception and critical analysis ==
It has been noted that The Telling is just as much a story about religion and politics as it is a story about storytelling. It has also been noted as having a standard Le Guin writing approach because it has a clear outside observer/narrator and a setting that includes strongly contrasting civilizations.

Gerald Jonas, reviewing The Telling for The New York Times, found it to be "an anthropological puzzle story" but because the main character Sutty has little personal stake on Aka she comes across as "little more than a mouthpiece for the author's personal vision of the good society."

== Awards ==
The Telling won the Endeavour Award which recognizes distinguished novels or collections in 2001. It also won the Locus Award for Best Science Fiction Novel in 2001.

== Translations ==
The Telling was translated into Hebrew as ההגדה(The Haggadah) by Ornit Shachar (אורנית שחר), into German as Die Überlieferung (collected in the volume Grenzwelten) by Karen Nölle, and into Turkish as Anlatış by Kemal Baran Özbek. In Italy is translated as La salvezza di Aka (Aka's Salvation).
