= The Matter of Seggri =

1994 novelette by Ursula K. Le Guin

- Short story by Ursula K. Le Guin
- Language: English
- Genre: Science fiction

Publication
- Published in: Crank!
- Publication type: Anthology
- Publication date: 1994
- Publication place: United States
- Media type: Print

"The Matter of Seggri" is a science fiction novelette by American writer Ursula K. Le Guin. It was first published in 1994 in the third issue of Crank!, a science fiction – fantasy anthology, and has since been printed in a number of other publications. In 2002, it was published in Le Guin's collection of short stories The Birthday of the World: and Other Stories. "The Matter of Seggri" won the Otherwise Award in 1994 for exploring "gender-bending" and has been nominated for other honors including the Nebula Award.

== Style and plot summary ==
The story is set on Seggri, a planet featuring extreme gender segregation. Seggri is also a part of the fictional interplanetary society called the Ekumen; the story belongs to the Hainish Cycle.

"The Matter of Seggri" has been described as anthropological science fiction because Le Guin describes the society of Seggri in depth. The story is separated into five different accounts, using male and female voices to tell different stories about life on Seggri: a log written by a male alien observer, notes for the Ekumen from a female Hain native, a memoir of Seggri written by a female native, a fictional short story placed on Seggri written by a female native, and an autobiography by a male Seggri native who has worked off Seggri and wants to return.

== Themes ==
Le Guin creates a society in which she is able to experiment with gender. She does this by making the female births numerically much greater than male births, "resulting in a society in which, as one narrator observes, the men have all the privilege and the women have all the power." In "The Matter of Seggri", Le Guin experiments with assigning specific roles to each gender that challenge the forms of power each gender has and their status in our society. A prominent reversal is the extreme sexualization of men: Le Guin creates "fuckeries" where women can come and pay for sex with a man of their choosing. As has been observed, Le Guin explores the idea of dominance "inquiringly rather than vindictively", giving women power through being the more plentiful sex.

=== Gender roles ===
"The Matter of Seggri" provides a social commentary on modern gender roles. In the story, Le Guin creates a world in which gender roles are switched. Males are trophies and have absolutely no significance in society other than for reproductive purposes, and women have all the power. Only women may have an education, only women may choose their sexual partners, and only women may work and function as a productive cog in the machine of society. This is only possible because Le Guin writes "speculative fiction". This works to break away from the limitations of common fiction and the stereotypical genres associated with it. Because speculative fiction is itself a genre about defying norms, feminist writers often use it to convey social commentary. Carl Freedman, a prominent science fiction writer, asserts that "Speculative fiction is thus a powerful educational tool which uses exaggeration to make women's lack of power visible and discussable. It can motivate women to avoid handicapping themselves by conforming to the demands of femininity." Freedman asserts that the blatant interchange of gender roles in Seggri serves to clearly show the reader how absurd modern gender roles are. The reason that it is unnoticed in present society is because it is a cultural norm for men to be in power in our patriarchal society. When presented with the reverse of what is currently accepted in present society, it should become more evident that work needs to be done to eradicate culturally normalized sexism.

=== Points of view ===
The story is told from five different points of view, each contributing to this central commentary on gender roles in a different way, building a theme very evident to the reader. The importance of the varied gender roles is discussed in "The Ethnographic Sensibilities of Ursula K. Le Guin" by the feminist anthropologist Beth Baker-Cristales. She explains Le Guin's exploration of culture and the differences that are focused on how Le Guin uses ethnography in her writings. Ethnography's goal is to explore cultural phenomena where the researcher observes society from the point of view of the subject of the study. Whereas most ethnographic writing is realist, Le Guin's writing completely controls and invents the world in "The Matter of Seggri" through her use of speculative fiction. Cristales argues that Le Guin’s writing style has an "anthropological sensibility" and her work shows interest in how societies work and how cultures are formed. This directly relates to "The Matter of Seggri" because two of the protagonists are similar to anthropologists in role. Captain Aolao-Olao and Merriment both go to Seggri to report back to their own worlds about the state of Seggri. They go to the experimental society and explore the culture, the society itself, and learn how everything within it functions. "In so much of Le Guin's work, the protagonists are anthropologists by another name. These characters inevitably face the question of how to conceptualize and react to cultural difference and, in the process, exemplify some of the field experiences and model some of the ways anthropologists tend to look at cultural others." Cristales hypothesizes that as Le Guin's parents were prominent American anthropologists, Le Guin was conditioned to think about the underlying circumstances that drive societal interactions by her parents, and so Le Guin's science fiction is so deeply rooted in societal interactions and the culture that they create.

=== Heteronormativity and feminist focuses ===
Veronica Hollinger, professor of cultural studies at Trent University, wrote "(Re)reading Queerly: Science Fiction, Feminism, and the Defamiliarization of Gender" to discuss the gender binarism of heteronormativity in modern society. Hollinger discusses how feminism can sometimes be self-imprisoning, just as examined in Sandra Bartky's article "Foucault, Femininity, and the Modernization of Patriarchal Power". This can be directly related to the concept of the Panopticon prison that Bartky lays out in her writings. In this model of prison, "each becomes to himself his own jailer." Each generation is taught by the previous one that women have specific roles in society and men have others, and they are taught that these roles do not intertwine. Bartky describes femininity as a prison because each generation upholds the oppressive and unfair standards that patriarchal society created. Femininity is in her view a self-imprisoning identity because most women are forced to conform to it due to patriarchal pressure. Seggri's reversed gender roles are Le Guin's commentary on the self-imprisoning nature of femininity and the gender roles in modern society. As Hollinger states, "In our struggle against a monolithic patriarchy—which is, after all, a kind of theoretical fiction produced, in part, by the very feminism aligned against it—we risk reinscribing, however inadvertently, to the terms of compulsory heterosexuality within our own constrictions." Hollinger also explains how Le Guin uses compulsory homosexuality and a monolithic matriarchy to contrast Seggri with present cultural norms and further emphasize the importance of the gender roles in Seggri.

William Macellino, a behavioral and social scientist from Carnegie Mellon University, discusses how "feminist utopian works critique dominant male power and focus and offer some kind of imagined, idealized society that is not characterized by male power and focus." In Le Guin's utopian society, male power is diminished and female authority is omnipresent. Males are portrayed as unimportant except for reproduction, and they are generally looked down upon by the women. Macellino's writing, "Shadows to Walk: Ursula Le Guin's Transgressions in Utopia", shows this by contrasting Seggri with modern culture.
