= A Fisherman of the Inland Sea =

1994 collection of works by Ursula K. Le Guin

- First edition
- Author: Ursula K. Le Guin
- Language: English
- Genre: Science fiction
- Publisher: Harper Prism
- Publication date: 1994
- Publication place: United States
- Media type: Print (hardcover)
- Pages: 191
- ISBN: 0-06-105200-0
- OCLC: 30895953
- Dewey Decimal: 813/.54 20
- LC Class: PS3562.E42 F57 1994

A Fisherman of the Inland Sea is a 1994 collection of short stories and novellas by the American author Ursula K. Le Guin. The collection was second in the 1995 Locus Award poll in the collection category.

== Contents ==
The collection comprises eight works:

- "The First Contact with the Gorgonids"
- "Newton's Sleep"
- "The Ascent of the North Face"
- "The Rock That Changed Things"
- "The Kerastion"
- "The Shobies' Story"
- "Dancing to Ganam"
- "Another Story or A Fisherman of the Inland Sea"

== Details ==
=== The First Contact with the Gorgonids ===
"The First Contact with the Gorgonids" is a running joke within Le Guin's work. The stand-alone story is set in present-day Australia, and depicts an arrogant but stupid American man and his downtrodden wife. This strongly feminist story has the couple make contact with aliens who the husband mistakes for Australian Aboriginals. The resulting farce sees the husband put in his place and for the triumphant wife the spoils of the encounter.

=== Newton's Sleep ===
In a postcataclysmic earth, society is rebuilt on an orbiting space station in the form of a new Utopia ruled by an elect group of scientists who have established reason as the guiding principle. The story tells of the conflict that arises when a resurgent religion begins.

=== The Ascent of the North Face ===
A story told in the style of Victorian Boys Own Ripping Yarns, the "north face" from the title is not of some Himalayan mountain being scaled by westerners but Indian climbers and that the north face refers to the north face of a suburban house in Portland, Oregon near where Le Guin lived.

=== The Shobies' Story ===
"The Shobies' Story" is set in Le Guin's Hainish universe, and follows the protagonists of the first successful jump to a planet using Churten theory. They discover that their experience and memories of the planet are radically different. This matters because Churten theory is more philosophical than scientific. The dissonance between their perceptions of the planets creates massive existential rifts in the fabric of space and time. The story tells of the protagonist's attempt to reconcile their perceptions of what happened and mend the rift.

=== Dancing to Ganam ===
"Dancing to Ganam" is also set in the Hainish universe, and forms a sequel to "The Shobies' Story".

Two humans (Shan and Tai) from a far future Earth, have arrived on the fictional planet Hain, heroes due to their being crew members of the first faster-than-light space flight, depicted in "The Shobies' Story". When they arrive, another Earth human called Dalzul has also arrived. Dalzul is charismatic and diplomatic and known for having saved thousands of children. He has just used the same faster than light technology to travel to a new planet but without the "distortions" of reality found in "The Shobies Story". When he arrived, he found a planet called Ganam, an isolated world inhabited by pre-industrial humans.

Dalzul suggests that they join him on a return flight, Tai declines and Shan accepts. He suggests that during the flight they sing together to synchronize their perceptions of the flight, and this strategy seems to be successful. When they arrive they are honored and Dalzul is treated as a god-king. The longer they stay on the planet however, the more the crew find dissonances in reality causing confusion and uncertainty.

Dalzul is treated as a god and is taken to a ceremony he perceives to be a coronation but at which he is a sacrifice. It turns out that although their flight was successfully without distortions in the perception that plagued the Shobies' flight, Dalzul's ego had shaped his perception of Ganam culture away from reality.

=== Another Story or A Fisherman of the Inland Sea ===
"Another Story or A Fisherman of the Inland Sea" was written by Le Guin in 1994, and is also set in the Hainish universe. The title is a reference to the legend of Urashima Tarō, which is described in the story.

The plot follows a scientist from the fictional planet O who turns his back on the quiet rural life of his planet to join in the development of a faster than light technology called Churten Theory. To do this he leaves for another planet called Hain, a journey that will take a long time and as a result he must say goodbye to everyone and everything he has ever known.

When he arrives there is a message waiting for him which he does not read because it is too garbled. Gripped with a great remorse for what he has left, he pours himself into his work and manages to make progress in the understanding of Churten theory, but unintentionally transports himself back to the time and place that he left his home. There he re-establishes his life and relationships that he left behind and lives out his life in his home world. Many years in the future, on the day he would arrive in Hain, he sends a message to himself: the garbled message he himself received so many years ago. That message is the story of his life and is itself the content of the story for the reader.
