= Hainish Cycle =

Science fiction series by Ursula K. Le Guin

The Hainish Cycle consists of a number of science fiction novels and stories by Ursula K. Le Guin. The cycle is set in a future history that features civilizations of human beings on planets orbiting a number of nearby stars, including Terra ("Earth"); these humans are contacting each other for the first time and establishing diplomatic relations, as well as setting up a confederacy under the guidance of the oldest of the human worlds, the peaceful planet Hain. In this history, human beings did not evolve on Earth, but they were instead the result of interstellar colonies planted by Hain in the distant past, after which interstellar travel ceased for an extended period. Some of the human races have new genetic traits, a result of ancient Hainish experiments in genetic engineering; this includes people who can dream while awake, and a world of hermaphroditic people who only enter active sexuality once per month, not knowing which sex will manifest in them. In keeping with Le Guin's narrative approach, she uses varied social and environmental settings to explore the anthropological and sociological outcomes of human evolution in those environments. The author often discounted the characterization of a so-called "Hainish Cycle".

Many of Le Guin's works have won literary awards, including the Hainish novels The Left Hand of Darkness (1969) and The Dispossessed (1974); the novella The Word for World Is Forest (1972); and the collection of stories "5 Ways to Forgiveness" (1995), as well as the short stories "The Day Before the Revolution" (1974) and "The Matter of Seggri" (1994).

== Story chronology ==
In the first three novels—Rocannon's World (1966), Planet of Exile (1966), and City of Illusions (1967)—there is a League of All Worlds; by City of Illusions, the League seems to have been conquered or fragmented by an alien race, the Shing, from beyond the League. In the fourth, The Left Hand of Darkness (1969), the planets of the former League have reunited as the Ekumen, which was founded by the Hainish people. The fifth, The Word for World Is Forest (1972), part of the anthology Again, Dangerous Visions (and only published as a separate book in 1976) is set before any of the first four books, and in it the League of All Worlds and the ansible are new, and the term "Ekumen" is not used. The sixth, The Dispossessed (1974), is the earliest Hainish novel, chronologically; in it, the Cetians have been visited by people from other planets, including Terra (Earth) and Hain, and while the various planets are separate, there is some talk of a union (and the ansible concept is known, but none yet exist). The seventh and final novel, The Telling (2000), and the later short stories only speak of the Ekumen—which now includes the Gethenians, who were the subject of The Left Hand of Darkness—and not of the League.

=== Le Guin's view ===
Le Guin often discounted the characterization of a "Hainish Cycle", writing on her website that "The thing is, they aren't a cycle or a saga. They do not form a coherent history. There are some clear connections among them, yes, but also some extremely murky ones."

Le Guin offers the following thoughts on the order in which readers should approach the series:

Rocannon's World, Planet of Exile, City of Illusions: where they fit in the "Hainish cycle" is anybody’s guess, but I’d read them first because they were written first. In them there is a "League of Worlds," but the Ekumen does not yet exist. / Then you could read The Word for World is Forest, The Left Hand of Darkness, [and] The Dispossessed, in any order. In Dispossessed, the ansible gets invented; but they’re using it in Left Hand, which was written fifteen years earlier. Please do not try to explain this to me. I will not understand. / Then in the collection of stories A Fisherman of the Inland Sea, the three last stories are Ekumenical, and we even finally find out a little about Hain, where it all began. The story suite Four Ways to Forgiveness is part of that universe, and so is the novel The Telling. But I have to warn you that the planet Werel in Four Ways is not the planet Werel in Planet of Exile. In between novels, I forget planets. Sorry. / The Eye of the Heron may or may not be set in the Hainish universe; it really doesn’t matter. As for The Lathe of Heaven and Always Coming Home, my Terran science fiction novels, they definitely don’t exist in the same universe as the Hainish or Ekumenical books.

== Universe of the stories ==
=== Backstory ===
Hundreds of thousands of years ago, the people of Hain colonized a large number of worlds, including Earth, known as Terra, meaning that human beings did not evolve on Earth. Most of these were similar enough that humans from one world can pass as natives of another, but on some the old Hainish 'colonisers' used genetic engineering. At least one of the various species of Rocannon's World are the product of genetic engineering, as are the "hilfs" ("highly intelligent life forms") of Planet S(whose story has not been told), and probably the androgynous humans of Gethen in The Left Hand of Darkness. The Ekumen do not know whether the colonisers sought to adapt humans to varied worlds, were conducting various experiments, or had other reasons.

Hainish civilization subsequently collapsed, and the colony planets (including Earth) forgot that other human worlds existed. The Ekumen stories tell of the efforts to re-establish a civilization on a galactic scale through NAFAL (Nearly As Fast As Light) interstellar travel taking years to travel between stars (although only weeks or months from the viewpoint of the traveler because of time dilation), and through instantaneous interstellar communication using the ansible.

This seems to have happened in two phases: First, the League of All Worlds was formed, as an alliance of planets, mostly descended from colonization efforts from the planet Hain, uniting the "nine known worlds" — presumably along with new colonies. By the time of Rocannon's World it has grown but is also under threat from a distant enemy. In City of Illusions it is recalled as having been a league of some 80 worlds at the time it was destroyed by aliens called the Shing, who are uniquely able to lie in mindspeech. After the apparent overthrow of the Shing by the descendants of marooned Terrans and the inhabitants of Alterra / Werel who have succeeded in interbreeding (as related in Planet of Exile) and are capable of detecting Shing lies, the alliance is eventually reconstructed.

A second phase begins with The Left Hand of Darkness. The 80 plus planets seem to have reunited as the Ekumen – a name derived from the Greek "oikoumene", meaning "the inhabited world", although characters occasionally refer to it as "the Household", which is in turn a reference to the Greek "oikos", a word which developed from the same root as "oikoumene". Unexplained references are made by the protagonist from Terra in The Left Hand of Darkness to a long-past "Age of the Enemy", which presumably refers to the time that the Shing controlled Terra, portrayed in City of Illusions.

=== Planets ===
The Ekumen (or the League of All Worlds, though that is also believed to be the previous planetary coalition, before some sort of galactic crisis) contains a very large number of planets and is continually exploring new ones. Genly Ai in The Left Hand of Darkness explains that there are 83 planets in the Ekumen, with Gethen a candidate for becoming the 84th. The process of reaching out to potential civilizations is a tedious and sometimes dangerous one.

=== Technology ===
Societies tend to use sophisticated but unobtrusive technologies. Most notable is the ansible, an instant-communication device that keeps worlds in touch with each other.

Physical communication is by NAFAL (Nearly As Fast As Light) ships. The physics is never explained; the ship vanishes from where it was and reappears somewhere else many years later. The trip takes slightly longer than it would to cross the same distance at the speed of light, but ship-time is just a few hours for those on board. It cannot be used for trips within a solar system. Trips can begin or end close to a planet, but if used without a "retemporalizer", there are drastic physical effects at the end of long trips, at least according to the Shing, whose information may be suspect. It is also lethal if the traveler is pregnant.

City of Illusions mentions automatic death-machines that work on the same principle as the ansible and can strike instantly at distant worlds. Such a device is clearly used in the events of Rocannon's World. The weapons are not mentioned again in later books.

Churten theory, as developed by the physicists of Anarres, should allow people to go instantly from solar system to solar system. It is a development of the work of Shevek, whose tale is told in The Dispossessed. Shevek's work made the ansible possible—it is mentioned in his tale that engineers decided they could build it once the correct theory was found. Churten theory offers a way to move people and spacecraft instantaneously, but there are side effects. These are described in three short stories, "The Shobies' Story," "Dancing to Ganam", and "Another Story, or, A Fisherman of the Inland Sea," all collected in A Fisherman of the Inland Sea (1994).

The ansible has been adopted by other science fiction and fantasy authors, such as Orson Scott Card, Elizabeth Moon, and Vernor Vinge.

=== Post-technological worlds ===
The ideas of post-technological societies and social and ecological collapse are in several of the stories. These are portrayed as the end result of the wrong kind of civilizations, i.e., competitive, capitalist, patriarchal, "dynamic, aggressive, ecology-breaking cultures," while successful societies are close to the land, peaceful, non-authoritarian, non-competitive, static, communitarian, with the holistic outlook of Eastern religions. The Earth, called "Terra" in the Cycle, is mentioned as one of the failed civilizations.

- In City of Illusions, Earth has suffered some sort of collapse in a distant future, losing contact with the stars.
- In The Dispossessed, the ecological disaster of Earth is described; it has become "a planet spoiled by the human species" through wars and runaway industrial development. Pollution has turned it into a desert and ruined the carrying capacity of the land. The population has fallen from nine billion to half a billion, who only survive by rationing, labor conscription, euthanasia, forced birth control, and the charity of the Hainish.
- In "Another Story" in A Fisherman of the Inland Sea, it is mentioned that Earth still suffers badly from pollution.
- Eleven-Soro had a high level of technology and then a massive crash, as is told in the short story "Solitude" in The Birthday of the World.
- Hain itself has gone back to a simpler life, with high technology used only where it can be justified, as is told in the first part of "A Man of the People" in Four Ways to Forgiveness. This also seems to apply to the planet Ve.
- Orint and Kheakh are mentioned in passing as worlds that have totally destroyed themselves.
- In The Left Hand Of Darkness, the planet Gde is described as extremely hot rock and desert, the result of a technological society that "wrecked its ecological balance" some millennia previous, and "burned up its forests for kindling."

=== Biology ===
Most of the people in the tales have a common descent from the planet Hain, whose people settled many worlds. Some of them are genetically similar enough to produce children together. The unusual hairiness of the Cetians is mentioned in The Word for World Is Forest and The Dispossessed. The Telling includes the detail that the people of Chiffewar are all bald.

There are some cases of ancient biological manipulation:

- Unique among known humans, the Hainish have complete voluntary control of their fertility. In order for a Hainish man and woman to reproduce, they must both consciously choose to produce viable genetic material, which they learn to do in adolescence. The required genetic changes to the Hainish population were made in the far distant past, and apparently took many generations to accomplish.
- The Left Hand of Darkness mentions that the hilfs of S must have been produced by human genetic manipulation by the ancient Hainish people, along with the Gethenians and the degenerate winged hominoids of Rokanan. We hear no more about the hilfs of S, unless these are the same as the small furry natives of Athshe, who are also of Hainish descent.
- The ambisexual humans of Gethen may have been produced as an adaptation to a harsh climate, or an experiment to see how people would live without gender. Both ideas are mentioned and nothing is definitely settled.
- The degenerate winged hominoids are seen in Rocannon's World. They live in cities that require much higher technology to build than the rest of the races on Rokanan, but live in bat-like societies, hunting for humans and animals on which their larvae feed by sucking their blood.
- The Matter of Seggri tells us that the extreme gender imbalance of the people of Seggri may be another case of genetic manipulation.
- Alterrans have distinctive cat-like eyes. While normally unable to breed with Earth-humans, the latter become sufficiently genetically similar within a few centuries on their planet due to unspecified natural factors. This almost drives the Earth-descended colony to extinction due to the genetic differences between mothers and fetuses causing miscarriages. The Alterrans may be another case of genetic manipulation, or a similar natural adaptation themselves.
- The Shing of City of Illusions are not of Hainish origin and cannot interbreed with Earth-humans. They dismiss the report about the human adaptation on Alterra as impossible.

== Hainish Cycle bibliography ==
Hainish novels and short story collections
| Title | Date | Publisher | Notes |
|---|---|---|---|
| Rocannon's World | 1966 | Ace Books | |
| Planet of Exile | 1966 | Ace Books | |
| City of Illusions | 1967 | Ace Books | |
| The Left Hand of Darkness | 1969 | Ace Books | Nebula Award winner, 1969; Hugo Award winner, 1970 |
| The Word for World is Forest | 1972 (anthology); 1976 (book) | Doubleday; Berkley/Putnam | Hugo Award winner for Best Novella, 1973; Nebula Award nominee for Best Novella, 1973; Locus Award nominee for Best Novella, 1973 |
| The Dispossessed: An Ambiguous Utopia | 1974 | Harper & Row | Hugo Award winner, 1975; Nebula Award winner, 1974; Locus Award winner for Best SF Novel, 1975 |
| Three Hainish Novels | 1978 | Nelson Doubleday | Omnibus of Rocannon's World, Planet of Exile and City of Illusions; republished in 1996 as Worlds of Exile and Illusion |
| Five Complete Novels | 1985 | Avenel Books | Omnibus of Rocannon's World, Planet of Exile, City of Illusions, The Left Hand of Darkness and The Word for World is Forest |
| Four Ways to Forgiveness | 1995 | HarperCollins | Prometheus award nominated, 1996 |
| The Telling | 2000 | Harcourt Brace & Company | Locus SF Award winner, 2001; Endeavour Award winner |
| The Hainish Novels & Stories | 2017 | Library of America | Collection of all Hainish novels and stories in two volumes. |
| Five Ways to Forgiveness | 2017 | Library of America | Collection of the four stories in Four Ways to Forgiveness with the addition of the story "Old Music and the Slave Women" |

Hainish short stories
| Title | Date | Original Publication | Notes |
|---|---|---|---|
| "The Dowry of Angyar" | 1964 | Amazing Stories September 1964 | appears as "Semley's Necklace" in The Wind's Twelve Quarters; also used as the first chapter of Rocannon's World, where it is titled "Prologue: The Necklace". |
| "Winter's King" | 1969 | Orbit 5 | collected in The Wind's Twelve Quarters |
| "Vaster than Empires and More Slow" | 1971 | New Dimensions 1: Fourteen Original Science Fiction Stories | collected in The Wind's Twelve Quarters, and The Found and the Lost |
| "The Day Before the Revolution" | 1974 | Galaxy Science Fiction August 1974 | collected in The Wind's Twelve Quarters; winner of the Nebula Award and Locus Award |
| "The Shobies' Story" | 1990 | Universe 1 | collected in A Fisherman of the Inland Sea |
| "Dancing to Ganam" | 1993 | Amazing Stories September 1993 | collected in A Fisherman of the Inland Sea |
| "Another Story or a Fisherman of the Inland Sea" | 1994 | Harper Prism | collected in A Fisherman of the Inland Sea, and The Found and the Lost |
| "The Matter of Seggri" | 1994 | Crank! #3, Spring 1994 | collected in The Birthday of the World, and The Found and the Lost; winner of the James Tiptree Jr. Award, 1995 |
| "Unchosen Love" | 1994 | Amazing Stories Fall 1994 | collected in The Birthday of the World |
| "Solitude" | 1994 | The Magazine of Fantasy & Science Fiction December 1994 | collected in The Birthday of the World; winner of the Nebula Award, 1996 |
| "Coming of Age in Karhide" | 1995 | New Legends | collected in The Birthday of the World |
| "Mountain Ways" | 1996 | Asimov's Science Fiction August 1996 | collected in The Birthday of the World; winner of the James Tiptree Jr. Award |
| "Old Music and the Slave Women" | 1999 | Far Horizons 1999 | collected in The Birthday of the World, The Found and the Lost, and Five Ways to Forgiveness |
