= Ursula K. Le Guin bibliography =

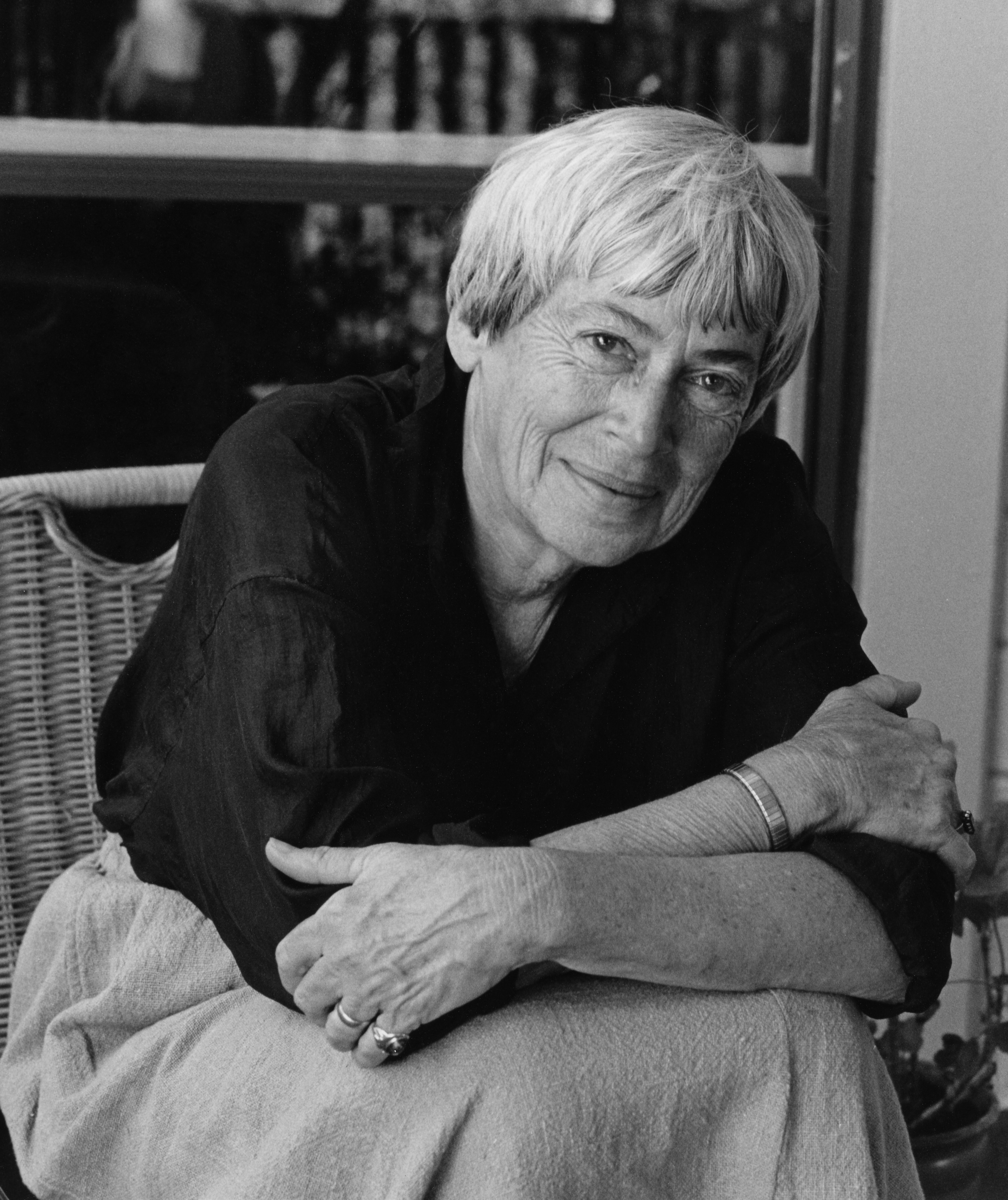
Le Guin in 1995

Ursula K. Le Guin (1929–2018) was an American author of speculative fiction, realistic fiction, non-fiction, screenplays, librettos, essays, poetry, speeches, translations, literary critiques, chapbooks, and children's fiction. She was primarily known for her works of speculative fiction. These include works set in the fictional world of Earthsea, stories in the Hainish Cycle, and standalone novels and short stories. Though frequently referred to as an author of science fiction, critics have described her work as being difficult to classify.

Le Guin came to critical attention with the publication of A Wizard of Earthsea in 1968, and The Left Hand of Darkness in 1969. The Earthsea books, of which A Wizard of Earthsea was the first, have been described as Le Guin's best work by several commentators, while scholar Charlotte Spivack described The Left Hand of Darkness as having established Le Guin's reputation as a writer of science fiction. Literary critic Harold Bloom referred to the books as Le Guin's masterpieces. Several scholars have called the Earthsea books Le Guin's best work. Her work has received intense critical attention. As of 1999, ten volumes of literary criticism and forty dissertations had been written about her work: she was referred to by scholar Donna White as a "major figure in American letters". Her awards include the National Book Award, the Newbery Medal, and multiple Hugo and Nebula Awards. Feminist critiques of her writing were particularly influential upon Le Guin's later work.

Le Guin's first published work was the poem "Folksong from the Montayna Province" in 1959, while her first short story was "An die Musik", in 1961; both were set in her fictional country of Orsinia. Her first professional publication was the short story "April in Paris" in 1962, while her first published novel was Rocannon's World, released by Ace Books in 1966. Her final publications included the non-fiction collections Dreams Must Explain Themselves and Ursula K Le Guin: Conversations on Writing, and the poetry volume So Far So Good: Final Poems 2014–2018, all of which were released after her death. This bibliography includes all of Le Guin's published novels, short fiction, translations, and edited volumes, and all collections that include material not previously published in book form, as well as any works mentioned in commentary about Le Guin's writings.

== Fiction and poetry ==
Title	Series or setting, where applicable	Format	Time of first publication	First edition publisher/publication	Notes	Unique identifier	Citations
A Wizard of Earthsea	Earthsea	Novel	1968	Berkeley, Parnassus Press	Illustrated by Ruth Robbins.	OCLC 1210	
The Tombs of Atuan	Earthsea	Novel	1971	New York City, Atheneum Books	Illustrated by Gail Garraty. A shortened version of The Tombs of Atuan was published in the Winter 1970 issue of Worlds of Fantasy.	ISBN 978-0-689-20680-1	
The Farthest Shore	Earthsea	Novel	1972	New York City, Atheneum Books	Illustrated by Gail Garraty.	ISBN 978-0-689-30054-7	
Tehanu	Earthsea	Novel	1990	New York City, Atheneum Books	Illustrated by John Jude Palencar.	ISBN 978-0-689-31595-4	
Tales from Earthsea	Earthsea	Collection	2001	New York City, Harcourt	Illustrated by Kelly Nelson. Includes "The Finder", "Darkrose and Diamond", "The Bones of the Earth", "On the High Marsh", and "Dragonfly".	ISBN 978-0-15-100561-1	
The Other Wind	Earthsea	Novel	2001	New York City, Harcourt	Illustrated by Cliff Nielsen.	ISBN 978-0-547-54319-2	
"The Word of Unbinding"	Earthsea	Short story	January 1964	Fantastic magazine, vol. 13	Reprinted in The Wind's Twelve Quarters (1975).		
"The Rule of Names"	Earthsea	Short story	April 1964	Fantastic magazine, vol. 13	Reprinted in The Wind's Twelve Quarters (1975), The Unreal and the Real (2012) and The Books of Earthsea: The Complete Illustrated Edition (2018).		
"Dragonfly"	Earthsea	Novella	1998	Legends, edited by Robert Silverberg. New York City, Tor Books.	"Dragonfly", later collected in Tales from Earthsea (2001), is intended to fit in between Tehanu and The Other Wind and, according to Le Guin, is "an important bridge in the series as a whole".		
"Darkrose and Diamond"	Earthsea	Short story	October – November 1999	The Magazine of Fantasy & Science Fiction, vol. 97	Reprinted in Tales from Earthsea (2001)		
"The Daughter of Odren"	Earthsea	Short story	September 2014	eBook, Harcourt	First printed in The Books of Earthsea (2018).		
"Firelight"	Earthsea	Short story	Summer 2018	The Paris Review, vol. 225	Reprinted in The Books of Earthsea.		
The Books of Earthsea	Earthsea	Collection	2018	New York City, Saga Press	Illustrated by Charles Vess. Includes all Earthsea works, including novels, short stories, the essay "Earthsea Revisioned", and a new introduction. First print appearance of "The Daughter of Odren", first book printing of "Firelight".	ISBN 978-1-4814-6558-8	
Rocannon's World	Hainish Cycle	Novel	1966	New York City, Ace Books		OCLC 9159033	
Planet of Exile	Hainish Cycle	Novel	1966	New York City, Ace Books		OCLC 36446381	
City of Illusions	Hainish Cycle	Novel	1967	New York City, Ace Books		OCLC 1012127541	
The Left Hand of Darkness	Hainish Cycle	Novel	1969	New York City, Ace Books		OCLC 181524	
The Dispossessed	Hainish Cycle	Novel	1974	New York City, Harper & Row		ISBN 978-0-06-012563-9	
"The Word for World Is Forest"	Hainish Cycle	Novella	1972	Again, Dangerous Visions, edited by Harlan Ellison. Garden City, New York, Doubleday.	Reprinted as a standalone volume in New York City by Berkley Books in 1976.	ISBN 978-0-425-03279-4	
Four Ways to Forgiveness	Hainish Cycle	Story cycle	1995	New York City, Harper Prism	Includes "Betrayals", "Forgiveness Day", "A Man of the People", and "A Woman's Liberation". Reprinted in 2017 under the title Five Ways to Forgiveness, with "Old Music and the Slave Women" added.	ISBN 978-0-06-105401-3	
The Telling	Hainish Cycle	Novel	2000	New York City, Ace Books		ISBN 978-0-441-01123-0	
"The Dowry of Angyar"	Hainish Cycle	Short story	September 1964	Amazing Stories, vol. 38	The first piece of Hainish Cycle fiction written by Le Guin. In later publications the story appears as "Semley's Necklace". It is also used as the prologue of Rocannon's World. Collected in The Wind's Twelve Quarters and The Unreal and the Real.		
"Winter's King"	Hainish Cycle	Short story	1969	Orbit 5, edited by Damon Knight. New York City, G. P. Putnam's Sons.	Revised and collected in The Wind's Twelve Quarters (1975). The story was published as a stand-alone eBook by Harper Perennial in 2017.	ISBN 978-0-06-247099-7	
"Vaster than Empires and More Slow"	Hainish Cycle	Short story	1971	New Dimensions 1, edited by Robert Silverberg. Garden City, New York, Doubleday.	Collected in The Wind's Twelve Quarters (1975) and in The Found and the Lost (2016). Published as a stand-alone eBook by Harper Perennial in 2017.	ISBN 978-0-06-247099-7	
"The Day Before the Revolution"	Hainish Cycle	Short story	August 1974	Galaxy Science Fiction, vol. 35	Collected in The Wind's Twelve Quarters (1975). Published as a stand-alone eBook by Harper Perennial in 2017.	ISBN 978-0-06-247098-0	
"The Shobies' Story"	Hainish Cycle	Short story	1990	Universe 1, edited by Terry Carr. New York City, Ace Books.	Collected in A Fisherman of the Inland Sea (1994) and The Unreal and the Real (2012).		
"Dancing to Ganam"	Hainish Cycle	Short story	September 1993	Amazing Stories, vol. 68			
"Another Story"	Hainish Cycle	Novella	August 1994	Tomorrow Speculative Fiction magazine	Collected in A Fisherman of the Inland Sea (1994), titled "Another Story or A Fisherman of the Inland Sea".		
"The Matter of Seggri"	Hainish Cycle	Novelette	Spring 1994	Crank! magazine	Collected in The Birthday of the World (2002), The Unreal and the Real (2012) and The Found and the Lost (2016).		
"Unchosen Love"	Hainish Cycle	Short story	Fall 1994	Amazing Stories, vol. 69			
"Solitude"	Hainish Cycle	Short story	December 1994	The Magazine of Fantasy & Science Fiction, vol. 87	Collected in The Birthday of the World (2002) and The Unreal and the Real (2012).		
"Coming of Age in Karhide"	Hainish Cycle	Short story	1995	New Legends, edited by Greg Bear and Martin Greenberg. London, Legend Books.	Collected in The Birthday of the World (2002).		
"Mountain Ways"	Hainish Cycle	Short story	August 1996	Asimov's Science Fiction, vol. 20	Collected in The Birthday of the World (2002).		
"Old Music and the Slave Women"	Hainish Cycle	Novella	August 1996	Far Horizons, edited by Robert Silverberg. New York City, Avon Eos.	Collected in The Found and the Lost (2016), and Five Ways to Forgiveness (2017).		
"Texts"	Klatsand	Short story	1990	American Short Fiction, as part of the PEN Syndication Fiction Project.	Collected in Searoad (1991) and The Unreal and the Real (2012).		
"Sleepwalkers"	Klatsand	Short story	1991	Mississippi Mud.	Collected in Searoad (1991) and The Unreal and the Real (2012)		
"Hand, Cup, Shell"	Klatsand	Short story	1989	The Southwest Review Autumn 1989	Collected in Searoad (1991) and The Unreal and the Real (2012)		
"Folksong from the Montayna Province"	Orsinia	Poem	1959	Prairie Poet	Le Guin's first published work.		
"Unlocking the Air"		Short story	1990	Playboy.	Collected in Unlocking the Air and Other Stories (1996) and The Unreal and the Real (2012).		
"An die Musik"	Orsinia	Short story	1961	Western Humanities Review	Le Guin's first published short story.		
"Imaginary Countries"	Orsinia	Short story	Winter 1973	The Harvard Advocate	Collected in The Unreal and the Real (2012)		
"Betrayals"		Short story	1994	The Blue Motel	Collected in Four Ways to Forgiveness, Five Ways to Forgiveness, and The Unreal and the Real (2012)		
"A Week in the Country"	Orsinia	Short story	Spring 1976	The Little Magazine, vol. 9	Collected in The Unreal and the Real (2012)		
"Brothers and Sisters"	Orsinia	Short story	Summer 1976	The Little Magazine, vol. 10	Collected in The Unreal and the Real (2012)		
"Two Delays on the Northern Line"	Orsinia	Short story	November 1979	The New Yorker			
Orsinian Tales	Orsinia	Collection	1976	New York City, Harper & Row		ISBN 978-0-06-076343-5	
Malafrena	Orsinia	Novel	1979	New York City, Berkley Books		ISBN 978-0-425-04647-0	
The Complete Orsinia	Orsinia	Collection	2016	New York City, The Library of America	An omnibus of Orsinian Tales and Malafrena, as well as some original material.	ISBN 978-1-59853-493-1	
Orsinia	Orsinia	Collection	2017	London, Victor Gollancz	An omnibus of previously published Orsinian works, as well as some original material.	ISBN 978-1-4732-1206-0	
Gifts	Annals of the Western Shore	Novel	2004	New York City, Harcourt		ISBN 978-0-15-205124-2	
Voices	Annals of the Western Shore	Novel	2006	London, Orion Children's Books		ISBN 978-0-15-206242-2	
Powers	Annals of the Western Shore	Novel	2007	London, Orion Children's Books		ISBN 978-0-15-206674-1	
Catwings	Catwings	Children's book	1988	New York City, Orchard Books	Illustrated by S. D. Schindler.	ISBN 978-0-590-42833-0	
Catwings Return	Catwings	Children's book	1989	New York City, Orchard Books	Illustrated by S. D. Schindler.	ISBN 978-0-8335-6635-5	
Wonderful Alexander and the Catwings	Catwings	Children's book	1994	New York City, Orchard Books	Illustrated by S. D. Schindler.	ISBN 978-0-439-55191-5	
Jane On Her Own	Catwings	Children's book	1999	New York City, Orchard Books	Illustrated by S. D. Schindler.	ISBN 978-0-531-30133-3	
Always Coming Home	Kesh/Always Coming Home	Novel	1985	New York City, Harper & Row	While described as a novel, this is a "collage" of tales, verse, drawings, and other material from a fictional future society in the Napa Valley.	ISBN 978-0-06-015456-1	
"The Trouble with the Cotton People"	Kesh/Always Coming Home	Short story	Winter 1984	The Missouri Review, vol. 7			
"The Visionary"	Kesh/Always Coming Home	Short story	Winter 1984	Parabola: Myth and the Quest for Meaning, vol. 9			
"Time in the Valley"	Kesh/Always Coming Home	Short story	Winter 1985	The Hudson Review, vol. 37			
"May's Lion"	Kesh/Always Coming Home	Short story	1983	The Little Magazine, vol. 14,	Collected in The Unreal and the Real (2012)		
The Lathe of Heaven		Novel	1971	New York City, Charles Scribner's Sons		ISBN 978-0-684-12529-9	
Very Far Away from Anywhere Else		Novel	1976	New York City, Atheneum Books	Published in the United Kingdom as A Very Long Way from Anywhere Else.	ISBN 978-0-15-205208-9	
The Eye of the Heron		Novel	1978	Millennial Women, edited by Virginia Kidd. New York City, Delacorte Press.	Published as a standalone volume in London by Victor Gollancz in 1978. Le Guin has said that The Eye of the Heron "might" form part of the Hainish Cycle.	ISBN 978-0-575-03211-8	
The Beginning Place		Novel	1980	New York City, Harper & Row	Published in the United Kingdom as Threshold.		
Lavinia		Novel	2008	Orlando, Harcourt		ISBN 978-0-15-101424-8	
Leese Webster		Children's book	1979	New York City, Atheneum Books	Illustrated by James Brunsman.	ISBN 978-0-689-30715-7	
The Adventure of Cobbler's Rune		Children's book	1982	New Castle, Cheap Street Press	Illustrated by Alicia Austin.	ISBN 978-0-941826-00-6	
Solomon Leviathan's Nine Hundred and Thirty-First Trip Around the World		Children's book	1983	New Castle, Cheap Street Press	Illustrated by Alicia Austin.	ISBN 978-0-399-21491-2	
A Visit from Dr. Katz		Children's book	1988	New York City, Atheneum Books	Illustrated by Ann Barrow.	ISBN 978-0-689-31332-5	
Fire and Stone		Children's book	1988	New York City, Atheneum Books	Illustrated by Laura Marshall.	ISBN 978-0-689-31408-7	
Fish Soup		Children's book	1992	New York City, Atheneum Books	Illustrated by Patrick Wynne.	ISBN 978-0-689-31733-0	
A Ride on the Red Mare's Back		Children's book	1992	New York City, Orchard Books	Illustrated by Julie Downing.	ISBN 978-0-531-07079-6	
Tom Mouse		Children's book	2002	New York City, Roaring Brook Press	Illustrated by Julie Downing.	ISBN 978-0-7613-1599-5	
Cat Dreams		Children's book	2009	New York City, Orchard Books	Illustrated by S. D. Schindler.	ISBN 978-0-545-04216-1	
"April in Paris"		Short story	September 1962	Fantastic magazine, vol. 11	Le Guin's first professionally published short story. Reprinted in The Wind's Twelve Quarters (1975) and several other anthologies.		
"The Masters"		Short story	February 1963	Fantastic magazine, vol. 12	Reprinted in The Wind's Twelve Quarters (1975)		
"Darkness Box"		Short story	November 1963	Fantastic magazine, vol. 12	Reprinted in The Wind's Twelve Quarters (1975)		
"Selection"		Short story	August 1964	Amazing Stories, vol. 38			
"Nine Lives"		Novelette	November 1969	Playboy, vol. 16	Collected in The Wind's Twelve Quarters and The Unreal and the Real.		
"A Trip to the Head"		Short story	1970	Quark/1, edited by Samuel R. Delany and Marilyn Hacker			
"Things"		Short story	1970	Orbit 6, edited by Damon Knight	Published as an eBook by Harper Perennial in 2017.	ISBN 978-0-06-247086-7	
"The Good Trip"		Short story	August 1970	Fantastic magazine, vol. 19	Published as an eBook by Harper Perennial in 2017.	ISBN 978-0-06-247101-7	
"The Field of Vision"		Short story	October 1973	Galaxy Science Fiction, vol. 34	Published as an eBook by Harper Perennial in 2017.	ISBN 978-0-06-247091-1	
"The Ones Who Walk Away from Omelas"		Short story	1973	New Dimensions III, edited by Robert Silverberg	Collected in The Wind's Twelve Quarters and The Unreal and the Real (2012): published as an ebook by Harper Perennial in 2017.		
"Direction of the Road"		Short story	1973	Orbit 12, edited by Damon Knight	Collected in The Unreal and the Real (2012)		
"The Stars Below"		Short story	1974	Orbit 14, edited by Damon Knight	Published as an eBook by Harper Perennial in 2017.	ISBN 978-0-06-247089-8	
"The Author of the Acacia Seeds and Other Extracts from the Journal of the Association of Therolinguistics"		Short story	1974	Fellowship of the Stars, edited by Terry Carr. New York City, Simon & Schuster.	Collected in The Compass Rose (1982), Buffalo Gals and Other Animal Presences (1987), and The Unreal and the Real (2012).		
"Schrödinger's Cat"		Short story	1974	Universe 5, edited by Terry Carr. New York City, Random House.			
"Intracom"		Short story	1974	Stopwatch, edited by George Hay. Shrewsbury, New England Library.			
"The Eye Altering"		Short story	1974	The Altered I, edited by Lee Harding. Melbourne, Norstrilia Press.			
"Mazes"		Short story	1975	Epoch, edited by Roger Elwood and Robert Silverberg. New York City, Berkley Publishing Corporation.	Collected in The Compass Rose and The Unreal and the Real.		
"The New Atlantis"		Short story	1975	The New Atlantis and Other Novellas of Science Fiction, edited by Robert Silverberg. New York City, Hawthorn Books.			
"The Diary of the Rose"		Short story	1976	Future Power, edited by Gardner Dozois and Jack Dann. New York City, Random House.	Collected in The Unreal and the Real (2012)		
"Gwilan's Harp"		Short story	1977	Redbook	Also released as an audiobook read by the author, published as a standalone book by Lord John Press in 1981, and collected in The Unreal and the Real (2012).	ISBN 978-0-935716-11-5	
"Ghost Story"		Short story	1977	Encore, Magazine of the Arts vol. 1, issue 6, April-May 1977. Portland, Encore Publishing, Inc.	Distributed to attendees of The Oregon Symphony and The Portland Opera. On the Table of Contents as "Three..."		
"The Silence of the Asonu"		Short story	1998	Orion, under the title The Wisdom of the Asonu,	Collected in The Unreal and the Real (2012)		
"The Wife's Story"		Short story	1982	The Compass Rose, Pendragon Press.	Reprinted in The Unreal and the Real (2012)		
"Courtroom Scene"		Short story	1977	Encore, Magazine of the Arts vol. 1, issue 6, April–May 1977. Portland, Encore Publishing, Inc.	Distributed to attendees of The Oregon Symphony and The Portland Opera. On the Table of Contents as "Three..."		
"SQ"		Short story	1978	Cassandra Rising, edited by Alice Laurance. New York City, Doubleday.			
"The First Report of the Shipwrecked Foreigner to the Kadanh of Derb"		Short story	Spring 1978	Antaeus No. 29			
"The Pathways of Desire"		Short story	1979	New Dimensions Science Fiction, Number 9, edited by Robert Silverberg. New York City, Harper and Row.			
"Malheur County"		Short story	Winter 1979	The Kenyon Review, vol. 1			
"Where Does Time Go?"		Short story	October 1979	Omni, vol. 2	Collected in The Compass Rose (2003), where it was titled "Some Approaches to the Problem of Shortage of Time".		
"The White Donkey"		Short story	1980	TriQuarterly No. 49	Collected in The Unreal and the Real (2012)		
"Small Change"		Short story	1981	Tor zu den Sternen, edited by Peter Wilfert. Munich, Goldmann Verlag.	Collected in The Compass Rose (1982) and The Unreal and the Real (2012).		
"Sur"		Short story	February 1982	The New Yorker	Collected in The Compass Rose (1982) and The Unreal and the Real (2012).		
"The Spoons in the Basement"		Short story	August 1982	The New Yorker	Collected in Unlocking the Air and Other Stories (1996) and The Unreal and the Real (2012).		
"The Professor's Houses"		Short story	November 1982	The New Yorker			
"The Ascent of the North Face"		Short story	1983	Isaac Asimov's Space of Her Own, edited by Shawna McCarthy. New York City, Davis Publications.	Collected in A Fisherman of the Inland Sea (1994) and The Unreal and the Real (2012).		
"She Unnames Them"		Short story	January 1985	The New Yorker	Collected in Buffalo Gals and Other Animal Presences (1987) and The Unreal and the Real (2012).		
"Horse Camp"		Short story	August 1986	The New Yorker	Collected in The Unreal and the Real (2012)		
"Daddy's Big Girl"		Short story	January 1987	Omni			
"Half Past Four"		Short story	September 1987	The New Yorker	Collected in The Unreal and the Real (2012).		
"Kore 87"		Short story	June 1988	Terry's Universe, edited by Beth Meacham. Tor, place of publication unknown.	The story was later anthologized under the title "A Child Bride".		
"The Kerastion"		Short story	1990	Westercon 1990 Program Book.			
"Newton's Sleep"		Short story	1991	Full Spectrum 3, edited by Lou Aronica, Amy Stout and Betsy Mitchell. New York City, Doubleday.			
"First Contact with the Gorgonids"		Short story	January 1992	Omni, vol. 14.	Collected in A Fisherman of the Inland Sea and The Unreal and the Real.		
"The Rock That Changed Things"		Short story	September 1992	Amazing Stories, vol. 67			
"The Poacher"		Short story	1993	Xanadu, edited by Jane Yolen. New York City, Tor Books.	Collected in Unlocking the Air and Other Stories (1996) and The Unreal and the Real (2012).		
"In the drought"		Short story	1994	Xanadu 2, edited by Jane Yolen. New York City, Tor Books.			
"Buffalo Gals, Won't You Come Out Tonight"		Short story	1994	Rohnert Park, Pomegranate Artbooks	A graphical version of the title story from Buffalo Gals and Other Animal Presences, illustrated by Susan Seddon Boulet. Collected in The Unreal and the Real (2012) and in The Found and the Lost (2016)	ISBN 978-0-87654-071-8	
"Ether OR"		Short story	November 1995	Asimov's Science Fiction, November 1995 issue.	Also stylized as Ether, Or. Reprinted in Unlocking the Air and Other Stories (1996) and The Unreal and the Real (2012).		
"Olders"		Short story	December 1995	Omni, vol. 17			
"The Lost Children"		Short story	January 1996	Thirteenth Moon, edited by Jacob Weisman. Tachyon Corporation, place of publication unknown.	Collected in The Unreal and the Real (2012)		
"The Island of the Immortals"		Short story	Fall 1998	Amazing Stories, vol. 70.			
"The Royals of Hegn"		Short story	February 2000	Asimov's Science Fiction, February 2000 issue.			
"The Birthday of the World"		Short story	January 2000	The Magazine of Fantasy and Science Fiction, vol. 98	Le Guin has said that this story may or may not be a part of the Hainish Cycle.		
"The Flyers of Gy"		Short story	November 2000	Published online on Sci Fi	Printed for the first time in Changing Planes (2002), where it was titled "The Fliers of Gy". Collected in The Unreal and the Real (2012).		
"The Building"		Short story	2001	Redshift, edited by Al Sarrantonio. New York City, New American Library.			
"The Wild Girls"		Short story	March 2002	Asimov's Science Fiction, March 2002 issue.	Collected in The Unreal and the Real.		
"Social Dreaming of the Frin"		Short story	November 2002	The Magazine of Fantasy & Science Fiction, vol. 103.			
"The Seasons of the Ansarac"		Short story	June 2002	Infinite Matrix		Collected in Changing Planes (2003).	
"LADeDeDa"		Short story	March 2009	Nature, vol. 458.	Written with Vonda McIntyre.		
"Elementals"		Short story	2013	The Year's Best Science Fiction & Fantasy, edited by Rich Horton. Prime Books, place of publication unknown.			
"The Jar of Water"		Short story	Winter 2014	Tin House magazine, winter 2014 issue.	Reprinted in a variant form, titled Jar of Water, in The Unreal and the Real.		
"Pity and Shame"		Short story	Summer 2018	Tin House magazine, Summer 2018 issue.			
Walking in Cornwall		Chapbook	1976	Originally published privately.	Published in 2008 in Maidstone, by Crescent Moon Publishing.	ISBN 978-1-86171-104-5	
The Water is Wide		Chapbook	1976	Portland, Pendragon Press	Collected in The Unreal and the Real (2012)		
Tillai and Tylissos		Chapbook	1979	St. Helena, Red Bull Press	Written with Theodora Kroeber.	OCLC 166327228	
In the Red Zone		Chapbook	1983	Northridge, Lord John Press	Written with Theodora Kroeber.	ISBN 978-0-935716-21-4	
A Winter Solstice Ritual		Chapbook	1991	Ygor and Buntho Make Books Press, place of publication unknown	Written with Vonda McIntyre.	OCLC 71852715	
No Boats		Chapbook	1992	Seattle, Ygor and Buntho Make Books Press.	Written with Vonda McIntyre.	OCLC 71852716	
Findings		Chapbook	1992	Browerville, Ox Head Press		OCLC 27185397	
Blue Moon over Thurman Street		Chapbook	1993	Portland, New Sage Press	Illustrated by Roger Dorband.	ISBN 978-0-939165-22-3	
The Wind's Twelve Quarters		Collection	1975	New York City, Harper & Row		ISBN 978-0-06-100162-8	
Dreams Must Explain Themselves		Collection	1975	New York City, Algol Press.	Includes one short story, an interview with Le Guin, a transcript of an acceptance speech and the essay the collection is titled after.	ISBN 978-0-916186-01-2	
The Compass Rose		Collection	1982	New York City, Harper & Row	Contained two previously unpublished short stories; 'The Phoenix' and 'The Wife's Story'.	ISBN 978-0-06-014988-8	
Buffalo Gals and Other Animal Presences		Collection	1987	Santa Barbara, Capra Press		ISBN 978-0-87654-071-8	
Searoad	Klatsand	Collection	1991	New York City, HarperCollins		ISBN 978-1-59030-084-8	
A Fisherman of the Inland Sea		Collection	1994	New York City, Harper Prism		ISBN 978-0-06-105200-2	
Unlocking the Air and Other Stories		Collection	1996	New York City, HarperCollins		ISBN 978-0-06-092803-2	
The Birthday of the World and Other Stories		Collection	2002	New York City, HarperCollins		ISBN 978-0-06-621253-1	
Changing Planes		Collection	2002	New York City, Harcourt		ISBN 978-0-15-100971-8	
The Wild Girls		Collection	2011	Oakland, PM Press		ISBN 978-1-60486-403-8	
The Unreal and the Real: The Selected Stories of Ursula Le Guin		Collection	2012	Northampton, Small Beer Press	Contained one short story previously unpublished in book form (Jar of Water, a variant of The Jar of Water (2014)). Initially published in two volumes: Where on Earth and Outer Space, Inner Lands.	ISBN 978-0-15-100971-8	
Wild Angels		Poetry collection	1975	Santa Barbara, Capra Press.		OCLC 747358131	
Hard Words and Other Poems		Poetry collection	1981	New York City, Harper & Row		ISBN 978-0-06-012579-0	
King Dog: A Screenplay		Screenplay	1985	Los Angeles, Capra Press		OCLC 603061230	
Wild Oats and Fireweed: New Poems		Poetry collection	1988	New York City, Perennial Library		ISBN 978-0-06-055101-8	
Going out with Peacocks and Other Poems		Poetry collection	1994	New York City, Harper Perennial		ISBN 978-0-06-055356-2	
The Twins, The Dream: Two Voices/Las Gemelas, El Sueño: Dos Voces.		Poetry collection	1997	Houston, Arte Publico Press	Written with Diana Bellessi. Each author also translated the other's poems.	ISBN 978-1-55885-179-5	
Sixty Odd		Poetry collection	1999	Boston, Shambhala Publications		ISBN 978-1-57062-388-2	
Incredible Good Fortune		Poetry collection	2006	Boston, Shambhala Publications		ISBN 978-1-59030-422-8	
Four Different Poems		Poetry collection	2007	Brattleboro, Longhouse Press		OCLC 241297013	
Out Here: Poems and Images from Steens Mountain Country		Poetry collection	2010	Astoria, Raven Studios	Illustrated with photographs by Roger Dorband.	ISBN 978-0-9728609-4-9	
Finding My Elegy: New and Selected Poems		Poetry collection	2012	New York City, Houghton Mifflin Harcout		ISBN 978-0-547-85820-3	
Late in the Day: Poems 2010–2014		Poetry collection	2015	Oakland, PM Press		ISBN 978-1-62963-122-6	
So Far So Good: Poems 2014–2018		Poetry collection	October 2018	Port Townsend, Copper Canyon Press		ISBN 978-1-55659-538-7	
Rigel-9		Rock opera	1985	The Famous Charisma Label	Music by David Bedford		
Uses of Music in Uttermost Parts		Spoken poetry set to music	1995	Koch International Classics	Music by Elinor Armer. Reprinted in Collected Poems.		
Ursula K. Le Guin's Book of Cats		Poetry, essay, and comic collection	2025	New York City, Library of America		ISBN 978-1-59853-829-8	

== Non-fiction ==
Title	Format	Time of first publication	First edition publisher	Notes	Unique identifier	Citations
From Elfland to Poughkeepsie	Essay collection	1973	Portland, Pendragon Press		ISBN 978-0-914010-00-5	
The Language of the Night	Essay collection	1979	New York City, G. P. Putnam's Sons	Edited by Susan Wood.	ISBN 978-0-399-12325-2	
Dancing at the Edge of the World	Essay collection	1989	New York City, Grove Press	Edited by Susan Wood.	ISBN 978-0-8021-1105-0	
Way of the Water's Going: Images of the Northern California Coastal Range	Essay collection	1989	New York City, Harper and Row	Featured text from Always Coming Home alongside photographs from Ernest Waugh and Allan Nicholson.	ISBN 978-0-06-016157-6	
Earthsea Revisioned	Essay	1993	Cambridge, Green Bay Press	Reproduction of a lecture given at Oxford University in 1992.	ISBN 978-0-948845-03-1	
Steering the Craft: Exercises and Discussions on Story Writing for the Lone Navigator or the Mutinous Crew	Essay collection	1998	Portland, The Eighth Mountain Press		ISBN 978-0-933377-46-2	
The Wave in the Mind	Essay collection	2004	Boston, Shambhala Publications		ISBN 978-1-59030-006-0	
Cheek by Jowl	Essay collection	2009	Seattle, Aqueduct Press		ISBN 978-1-933500-27-0	
Steering the Craft: A 21st-Century Guide to Sailing the Sea of Story	Essay collection	2015	New York City, Houghton Mifflin Harcourt		ISBN 978-0-544-61161-0	
Words Are My Matter: Writings About Life and Books, 2000–2016	Essay collection	2016	Easthampton, Small Beer Press		ISBN 978-1-61873-134-0	
No Time to Spare: Thinking About What Matters	Essay collection	2017	New York City, Houghton Mifflin Harcourt		ISBN 978-1-328-66159-3	
Dreams Must Explain Themselves and Other Essays 1972–2004	Essay collection	2018	London, Gollancz		ISBN 978-1-4732-0594-9	
"Fifteen Vultures, The Strop, and the Old Lady"	Essay	1972	In Clarion II: An Anthology of Speculative Fiction and Criticism, edited by Robin Scott Wilson			
"Dreams Must Explain Themselves"	Essay	November 1973	Algol, vol. 21			
"Why Are Americans Afraid of Dragons?"	Essay	Winter 1974	Pacific Northwest Library Association Quarterly, vol. 38			
"The Child and the Shadow"	Essay	April 1975	Quarterly Journal of the Library of Congress, vol. 32			
"Ketterer on The Left Hand of Darkness"	Essay	July 1975	Science Fiction Studies vol. 2			
"American SF and The Other"	Essay	November 1975	Science Fiction Studies vol. 2	Drawn from Le Guin's statements at a panel on women in science fiction at a convention in Bellingham in 1973; later published in a special issue of Science Fiction Studies covering Le Guin's work.		
"Is Gender Necessary?"	Essay	1976	Aurora: Beyond Equality, edited by Vonda McIntyre and Susan Janice Anderson			
"Science Fiction and Mrs Brown"	Essay	1976	Science Fiction at Large, edited by Peter Nicholls.	A speech Le Guin gave in London in 1975; it was first published in the 1976 volume edited by Nicholls.		
"The Carrier-Bag Theory of Fiction"	Essay	1988	Women of Vision: Essays by Women Writing Science Fiction, edited by Denise DuPont.	An influential essay about a non-heroic model of fiction.		
"Legends for a New Land"	Essay	1988	Mythlore, vol. 56	Guest of Honor Speech at the 19th Annual Mythopoeic Conference		
"All Happy Families"	Essay	1997	Michigan Quarterly Review, vol. 36			
The Altered I: An Encounter with Science Fiction	Chapbook	1976	Carlton, Nostrilia Press		OCLC 655714119	
The Art of Bunditsu	Chapbook	1982	Seattle, Ygor and Buntho Make Books Press		OCLC 318899045	
Myth and Archetype in Science Fiction	Chapbook	1991	Eugene, Writer's Notebook Press		OCLC 43699224	
Talking About Writing	Chapbook	1992	Eugene, Writer's Notebook Press		OCLC 32988295	
Ursula K. Le Guin: Conversations on Writing	Interview collection	2018	Portland, Tin House	A series of interviews conducted by David Naimon.	ISBN 978-1-941040-99-7	
Ursula K. Le Guin: The Last Interview	Interview collection	February 2018	New York City, Melville House	Edited by David Streitfeld	ISBN 978-1-61219-779-1	
Telling is Listening	Essay collection	2026	Olympic Peninsula, Winter Texts	Edited by Conner Bouchard-Roberts; a selection of essays previously collected in earlier volumes.	ISBN 978-1-7373706-7-3	

== Edited volumes ==
Title	Time of first publication	First edition publisher	Notes	Unique identifier	Citations
Nebula Award Stories 11	1976	London, Victor Gollancz		ISBN 978-0-575-02151-8	
Edges	1980	New York City, Pocket Books	Edited with Virginia Kidd.	OCLC 1028957543	
Interfaces	1980	New York City, Ace Books	Edited with Virginia Kidd.	OCLC 644488164	
The Norton Book of Science Fiction	1993	New York City, W. W. Norton & Company	Edited with Brian Attebery.	ISBN 978-0-393-97241-2	
Selected Stories of H. G. Wells	2004	New York City, Modern Library		ISBN 978-0-8129-7075-3	

== Translations ==
Title	Original author	Year of publication	First edition publisher	Notes	Unique identifier	Citations
Tao Te Ching	Lao Tzu	1997	Boston, Shambhala Publications		ISBN 978-1-57062-395-0	
Selected Poems of Gabriela Mistral	Gabriela Mistral	2003	Albuquerque, University of New Mexico Press		ISBN 978-0-8263-2818-2	
Kalpa Imperial	Angélica Gorodischer	2003	Northampton, Small Beer Press		ISBN 978-1-931520-05-8	
Squaring the Circle: A Pseudotreatise of Urbogony	Gheorghe Săsărman	2013	Seattle, Aqueduct Press	With Mariano Martín Rodríguez.	ISBN 978-1-61976-025-7	

== Sources ==
- Bernardo, Susan M.; Murphy, Graham J. (2006). Ursula K. Le Guin: A Critical Companion (1st ed.). Westport, Connecticut: Greenwood Press. ISBN 978-0-313-33225-8.
- Cadden, Mike (2005). Ursula K. Le Guin Beyond Genre: Fiction for Children and Adults (1st ed.). New York City: Routledge. ISBN 978-0-415-99527-6.
- Davis, Laurence; Stillman, Peter G. (2005). The New Utopian Politics of Ursula K. Le Guin's The Dispossessed. Lanham, Maryland: Lexington Books. ISBN 978-0-7391-1086-7.
- Erlich, Richard D. (December 2009). Coyote's Song: The Teaching Stories of Ursula K. Le Guin. Wildside Press LLC. ISBN 978-1-4344-5775-2.
- Le Guin, Ursula K. (1979). The Language of the Night: Essays on Fantasy and Science Fiction. New York City: Ultramarine Publishing. ISBN 978-0-399-50482-2.
- Le Guin, Ursula K. (2016). Ursula K. Le Guin: The Complete Orsinia. Library of America. ISBN 978-1-59853-494-8.
- Le Guin, Ursula K. (2016b). The Unreal and the Real: The Selected Short Stories of Ursula K. Le Guin. New York City: Simon & Schuster. ISBN 978-1-4814-7598-3.
- Le Guin, Ursula K. (July 14, 2016c). Always Coming Home. London: Victor Gollancz. ISBN 978-1-4732-0581-9.
- Nicholls, Peter; Clute, John; Sleight, Graham, eds. (April 7, 2018). "Le Guin, Ursula K.". The Encyclopedia of Science Fiction. London: Gollancz.
- Reid, Suzanne Elizabeth (1997). Presenting Ursula Le Guin. New York City: Twayne. ISBN 978-0-8057-4609-9.
- Spivack, Charlotte (1984). Ursula K. Le Guin (1st ed.). Boston, Massachusetts: Twayne Publishers. ISBN 978-0-8057-7393-4.
- White, Donna (1999). Dancing with Dragons: Ursula K. Le Guin and the Critics. Columbia, South Carolina: Camden House. ISBN 978-1-57113-034-1.
