= The Unreal and the Real =

2012 Le Guin short story collection

- Cover of the 2012 Small Beer Press edition
- Author: Ursula K. Le Guin
- Language: English
- Genre: Science fiction, fantasy
- Published: 2012 (Small Beer Press as two volumes), 2016 (Saga Press)
- Publication place: United States
- Media type: Print
- Pages: 626

The Unreal and the Real: The Selected Short Stories of Ursula K. Le Guin is a collection of short stories by American writer Ursula K. Le Guin. First issued by Small Beer Press in 2012 as a two-volume set, it was republished as a single volume by Saga Press in 2016. It was included in the boxed set with The Found and the Lost in the boxed set The Selected Short Fiction of Ursula K. Le Guin, which was shortlisted for the 2018 Pacific Northwest Booksellers Award.

The collection was a finalist for the 2014 Ken Kesey Award for Fiction.

The first volume is titled Where on Earth, and the introduction is titled "Choosing and Dividing. The second volume is titled Outer Space, Inner Lands with the introduction "The Obligatory Bit about Science Fiction, Fantasy, and Genre."

== List of stories ==
=== Volume One ===
Title	Time of first publication	First edition publisher/publication	Summary	Citations
"Brothers and Sisters"	Summer 1976	The Little Magazine, vol. 10	A short story in Orsinia.	
"A Week in the Country"	Summer 1976	The Little Magazine, vol. 9	A short story in Orsinia.	
"Unlocking the Air"	1990	Playboy		
"Imaginary Countries"	Winter 1973	The Harvard Advocate	A short story in Orsinia.	
"The Diary of the Rose"	1976	Future Power, edited by Gardner Dozois and Jack Dann. New York City, Random House.		
"Direction of the Road"	1973	Orbit 12, edited by Damon Knight	This story is a fantasy written from the perspective of a conscious tree as it stands beside a road. Le Guin acknowledged that it was inspired by a tree in the real world.	
"The White Donkey"	1980	TriQuarterly No. 49		
"Gwilan's Harp"	1977	Redbook		
"May's Lion"	1983	The Little Magazine, vol. 14,		
“Buffalo Gals”	1970			
"Horse Camp"	August 1986	The New Yorker		
"The Lost Children"	January 1996	Thirteenth Moon, edited by Jacob Weisman. Tachyon Corporation, place of publication unknown.		
The Water is Wide	1976	Portland, Pendragon Press		
"Texts"	1990	American Short Fiction, as part of the PEN Syndication Fiction Project. Previously collected in Searoad (1991). Klatsand.		
"Sleepwalkers"	1991	Mississippi Mud. Previously collected in Searoad (1991). Klatsand.		
"Hand, Cup, Shell"	1989	The Southwest Review Autumn 1989. Previously collected in Searoad (1991). Klatsand.		
"Ether OR"	November 1995	Asimov's Science Fiction, November 1995 issue.	Also stylized as Ether, Or. Reprinted in Unlocking the Air and Other Stories (1996).	
"Half Past Four"	September 1987	The New Yorker		

=== Volume Two ===
Title	Time of first publication	First edition publisher/publication	Summary	Citations
"The Ones Who Walk Away from Omelas"	1973	New Dimensions III, edited by Robert Silverberg	This piece describes a town whose citizens are universally happy, but whose happiness depends on a single child being in perpetual torment. Le Guin wrote that the story was inspired by a passage from the philosopher William James.	
"Semley's Necklace"	September 1964	Amazing Stories	The first piece of Hainish Cycle fiction written by Le Guin. Previously published as "The Dowry of Angyar", and used as the prologue of Rocannon's World. The story, inspired by the Norse legend of the Brísingamen, tells of an impoverished bride that journeys off-world to retrieve a precious necklace that once belonged to her family.	
"Nine Lives"	November 1969	Playboy, vol. 16	Collected in The Wind's Twelve Quarters.	
"Mazes"	1975	Epoch, edited by Roger Elwood and Robert Silverberg. New York City, Berkley Publishing Corporation.	Collected in The Compass Rose.	
"First Contact with the Gorgonids"	January 1992	Omni, vol. 14.	Previously collected in A Fisherman of the Inland Sea.	
"The Shobies' Story"	1990	Universe 1, edited by Terry Carr. New York City, Ace Books.	Previously collected in A Fisherman of the Inland Sea (1994).	
"Betrayals"	1994	The Blue Motel	Previously collected in Four Ways to Forgiveness and Five Ways to Forgiveness.	
"The Matter of Seggri"	Spring 1994	Crank! magazine	Previously collected in The Birthday of the World (2002) and The Found and the Lost (2016).	
"Solitude"	December 1994	The Magazine of Fantasy & Science Fiction, vol. 87	Previously collected in The Birthday of the World (2002).	
"The Wild Girls"	March 2002	Asimov's Science Fiction, March 2002 issue.	"Nine Lives" is a science fiction story, in which a group of human clones join a two-person exploratory party on a remote planet.	
“The Fliers of Gy”	November 2000	Published online on Sci Fi	Printed for the first time in Changing Planes (2002), where it was titled "The Fliers of Gy".	
"The Silence of the Asonu"	1998	Orion, under the title The Wisdom of the Asonu,		
"The Ascent of the North Face"	1983	Isaac Asimov's Space of Her Own, edited by Shawna McCarthy. New York City, Davis Publications.	Previously collected in A Fisherman of the Inland Sea (1994).	
"The Author of the Acacia Seeds and Other Extracts from the Journal of the Association of Therolinguistics"	1974	Fellowship of the Stars, edited by Terry Carr. New York City, Simon & Schuster.	Collected in The Compass Rose (1982), Buffalo Gals and Other Animal Presences (1987).	
"The Wife's Story"	1982	The Compass Rose, Pendragon Press.		
"The Rule of Names"	April 1964	Fantastic magazine, vol. 13	Reprinted in The Wind's Twelve Quarters (1975) and The Books of Earthsea: The Complete Illustrated Edition (2018).	
"Small Change"	1981	Tor zu den Sternen, edited by Peter Wilfert. Munich, Goldmann Verlag.	Previously collected in The Compass Rose (1982).	
"The Poacher"	1993	Xanadu, edited by Jane Yolen. New York City, Tor Books.	Previously collected in Unlocking the Air and Other Stories (1996).	
"Sur"	February 1982	The New Yorker	Previously collected in The Compass Rose (1982).	
"She Unnames Them"	January 1985	The New Yorker	Previously collected in Buffalo Gals and Other Animal Presences (1987).	
