= Whittington (novel) =

Children's fantasy novel by Alan Armstrong

- Author: Alan Armstrong
- Illustrator: S. D. Schindler
- Genre: Fantasy
- Publisher: Random House
- Publication date: 2005
- ISBN: 978-0375828652

Whittington is a children's fantasy novel by Alan Armstrong, published by Random House in 2005 with illustrations by S. D. Schindler. It was a 2006 Newbery Honor Book (Newbery Medal finalist) and an ALA Notable Book for Children.

== Plot introduction ==
The story is about a cat named Whittington that goes to live in a barn that is owned by a man named Bernie. Ben and Abby, Bernie's grandchildren, come to the barn. Ben struggles with reading in school. Ben has dyslexia and is struggling to learn how to read. He has been told by the school principal that if his reading skills do not improve, he will not advance to the next grade. Whittington tells the story of his namesake, a man named Dick Whittington, which encourages Ben.

== The three stories in Whittington ==
Three stories merge in the novel. The first is about Whittington, a scruffy tomcat, descended from Dick Whittington's legendary cat, who wants to become part of the community in a barn full of animal outcasts kept by the kindly Bernie and his grandchildren, Ben and Abby.

The second is the cat's retelling of the story of his famous ancestor, Dick Whittington's cat. The story of Dick and his cat, based in reality but told in legends dating back to the early 17th century and recounted in several modern books listed in the Endnote, is a rags-to-riches tale of a poor boy led to fame and fortune by an unusual pet with a knack for killing rats.

The third is about dyslexic Ben's efforts to learn to read before he is held back and placed in Special Ed.

The last two parallel each other to a certain extent, as Dick struggles to make his way in the world and Ben struggles with his frustration and fear. Dick is helped by his cat, who steers him to both fortune and love. Ben is helped by all the barn animals, who convince his sister to set up lessons in the barn, and get him to try out the Reading Recovery program at school, despite the teasing of his classmates.

== Publication ==
- Whittington. Illustrator S. D. Schindler. Random House. 2005. ISBN 978-0-375-92864-2.; reprint, Random House Digital, Inc., 2005, ISBN 978-0-375-82865-2
