= Jupiter Award =

Jupiter Award may refer to:

- Jupiter Award (science fiction award)
- Jupiter Award (film award)
