= Big Pumpkin =

1992 children's book by Erica Silverman

- Front cover
- Author: Erica Silverman
- Illustrator: S. D. Schindler
- Genre: Children's picture book
- Publisher: Aladdin Paperbacks
- Publication date: August 31, 1992
- Publication place: United States
- Media type: Print (paperback)
- Pages: 32 pp
- ISBN: 0-02-782683-X

Big Pumpkin is a children's book written by Erica Silverman, illustrated by S. D. Schindler, and published by Aladdin Paperbacks in 1992. The story is loosely based on a Russian folktale, "The Gigantic Turnip", and takes place on Halloween as a witch struggles to release her pumpkin from a vine.

== Plot ==
The story begins on Halloween. A witch has grown a large pumpkin in preparation, but she struggles to release the pumpkin from its vine. With Halloween just hours away, the witch desperately tries to tug and pull on the pumpkin, but to no avail. Not soon after, a ghost arrives and notices the large pumpkin. The witch explains how she wishes to release the pumpkin from the vine, but cannot. The ghost offers his help, but he is also unable to release the pumpkin from its vine.

A vampire then arrives and like the witch and the ghost, he also struggles to release the pumpkin. A mummy also notices the pumpkin and like the witch, ghost and vampire, she struggles to release the pumpkin using the same method as the other three. Soon a bat arrives and notices the pumpkin. Initially, the four others just laugh at the bat, but the bat suggests that they all work together to get the pumpkin off the vine. This new method proves to be successful as they are able to release the pumpkin from the vine. The pumpkin flies into the air and lands in front of the witch's house.

The witch makes pumpkin pie and shares it with the ghost, vampire, mummy and the bat. The story ends as the witch plants another pumpkin seed.

== Reception ==
Critical reception for Big Pumpkin was mostly positive, with the book garnering positive reviews from Publishers Weekly and Kirkus Reviews. The Horn Book Magazine gave a mostly positive review, calling it an "amiable take-off".

== Educational use ==
The book has been recommended for classroom use, to teach children not only about the holiday of Halloween but also about virtues such as caring and cooperation. The Scholastic cassette has the music of Richard DeRosa and the singing narration of Steven Blane.

== See also ==
- Bibliography of Halloween
