= The Diary of the Rose =

- Short story by Ursula K. Le Guin
- Country: United States
- Language: English
- Genre(s): Science fiction

Publication
- Published in: Future Power
- Publication type: Collection
- Media type: Print
- Publication date: 1976

"The Diary of the Rose" is a 1976 dystopian science fiction novelette by Ursula K. Le Guin, first published in the Future Power collection. The tale is set in a totalitarian society which uses brainwashing by "electroshocks" to eradicate any kind of political dissent.

== Plot ==
The story is the diary of "psychoscopist" Dr. Rosa Sobel, hired by state security to probe the mind of Flores Sorde for signs of "political psychosis", using a brain-mapping device called a psychoscope.

Conversations with Sorde eventually lead to the political awakening of Dr. Sobel.

== Commentary ==
The concept of "political psychosis" can be compared with Orwellian "thoughtcrimes".

Some critics link the novelette with the Orsinian cycle. However, in the introduction to the collection Where on Earth Ursula Le Guin remarked that, while the protagonist has an Orsinian name, she would rather think that the events took place in South America rather than in Orsinia.

When asked in an interview about her Orwellian-type stories, "The New Atlantis", "SQ", and "The Diary of the Rose", Ursula Le Guin commented:

Those three stories arose out of rage and fear at the institutionalised cruelty and stupidity of national governments — abroad and at home. None of them is more than slightly exaggerated. It is hard for a story to come close to the terrible reality of government-directed punishment of dissent and government-directed torture.

== Awards and nominations ==
All events were in 1977.

- Jupiter Award in the novelette category
- Runner-up in the Locus Award for Best Novelette.
- Hugo Award finalist
- Le Guin refused a Nebula Award for "The Diary of the Rose" by withdrawing the nomination in protest of the Science Fiction Writers of America's revocation of Stanisław Lem's membership. Le Guin attributed the revocation to Lem's criticism of American science fiction and willingness to live in the Eastern Bloc, and said she felt reluctant to receive an award "for a story about political intolerance from a group that had just displayed political intolerance" toward communism. She withdrew the novelette shortly before the announcement of the winners. The SFWA pleaded her not to do that since she had in fact won, but Le Guin insisted on the withdrawal. The award was instead given to Isaac Asimov's "The Bicentennial Man."

== Publication history ==
The first publication was in the Future Power collection in 1976. The same year it was translated into French.

In 1977 it was included in anthologies Psy Fi One: An Anthology of Psychology in Science fiction and Best Science Fiction Stories of the Year: Sixth Annual Collection.

It was anthologized in the author's collection The Compass Rose in 1982.

In 2012 it was included in Volume One, Where on Earth, of the two-volume collection The Unreal and Real of the author's works. In the opinion of Emily Nordling, a reviewer for tor.com, the story was included in the "Real" part of the collection despite the "hardcore" science fiction elements because it truly portrays the possible invasiveness of psychiatry regardless of instruments used.

It was translated into French (Le journal de la rose, 1976), Dutch (Het dagboek van de roos, 1978; De Roos in de Winter, (Note: The Dutch title De Roos in de Winter is reminiscent of the last words of the novelette: "<...>, the winter rose".) 1985), German (Das Tagebuch der Rose, 1979), Italian (Il diario della rosa, 2003), and Russian (Дневник Розы, 2008)

A BBC Radio audiobook version of The Diary of the Rose first aired in 2009.
