= The Wife's Story =

- Short story by Ursula K. Le Guin
- Country: United States
- Language: English

Publication
- Published in: The Compass Rose
- Publication type: Collection
- Publisher: Pendragon Press
- Media type: Hardback
- Publication date: 1982

"The Wife's Story" is a short story written by Ursula K. Le Guin.

== Plot summary ==
Written in a vernacular first-person narrative, the title character (who is eventually revealed to be a wolf) describes her beloved spouse and their idyllic family life in the past tense, except during the new moon, when he mysteriously disappeared. She then relates the night she witnessed his metamorphosis into a human and screamed in horror, resulting in her family and neighbors chasing and killing him.

== Interpretation ==
The story is unusual for its point-of-view: Of the many books and stories on werewolves, few are written from the perspective of wolves. Le Guin goes to great lengths to conceal the nature of the narrator, fully exploiting the reader's assumptions to purposefully heighten the plot twist at the story's denouement.
