= Alan Armstrong (writer) =

American writer

- Born: Alan W. Armstrong; December 15, 1939 (age 86)
- Education: Haverford College (1961); Princeton University (MPA, 1963); Yale University (JD, 1966)
- Occupation: Writer
- Known for: Whittington
- Spouse: Martha Armstrong

Alan W. Armstrong (born 1939) is an American writer. His best known book is the children's novel Whittington (2005), which was a Newbery Medal honor book. The following year, the Association for Library Service to Children also named it a Notable Children's Book. Armstrong is also the author of Off in Zora (1997), Regards, Rodeo (1999), Raleigh's Page (2007), Looking for Marco Polo (2009), and Racing the Moon (2012).

Armstrong was born in the United States on December 15, 1939. He graduate from Haverford College in 1961, then received a Master of Accountancy from Princeton University in 1963, followed by a Juris Doctor from Yale University in 1966.

Armstrong is married to Martha, with whom he lives in Massachusetts.

== Works ==
=== As author ===
- Off in Zora: A Modern-Day Tale of a Traveling Bookseller. 1997.
- Regards, Rodeo: The Mariner Dog of Cassis. Illustrated by Martha Armstrong. Turtleback Books. 1999. ISBN 978-0-613-95201-9.
- Whittington. Illustrations by S. D. Schindler. Random House. 2005. ISBN 978-0-375-92864-2.
- Raleigh's Page. Illustrated by Tim Jessell. Random House. 2007. ISBN 978-0-375-83319-9.
- Looking for Marco Polo. Illustrated by Tim Jessell. Random House Children's Books. 2009. ISBN 978-0-375-93321-9.
- Racing the Moon. Illustrated by Tim Jessell. Random. 2012. ISBN 978-0-375-85889-5.

=== As editor ===
- Forget not Mee and My Garden: Selected Letters, 1725-1768, of Peter Collinson, F.R.S., Memoirs, American Philosophical Society. Vol. 241. University of Pennsylvania Press. 2002.
