= Malafrena =

Novel by Ursula K. Le Guin

- Cover of first edition (hardcover)
- Author: Ursula K. Le Guin
- Cover artist: Michael Mariano
- Language: English
- Genre: Fantasy literature
- Publisher: Berkley Publishing Corporation
- Publication date: 1979
- Publication place: United States
- Media type: Print (Hardcover and Paperback)
- Pages: 369 (First edition)
- ISBN: 0-399-12410-1 (First edition, hardcover)
- OCLC: 4805125
- Dewey Decimal: 813/.5/4
- LC Class: PZ4.L518 Mal 1979 PS3562.E42

Malafrena is a 1979 novel by Ursula K. Le Guin. The only fantastic element of this novel is that it takes place in the imaginary Central European country of Orsinia, which is also the setting of her collection Orsinian Tales.

In many ways, Malafrena reads like a 19th-century novel, with its many detailed characters, its political and romantic subplots, its lack of the supernatural, and its settings that range from the mansions of the aristocracy to slums and a prison. Malafrena is written for an adult audience, rather than children and young adults, the target readership of most of Le Guin's works in the period of 1979–1994.

== Plot summary ==
The story takes place from 1825 to 1830, when Orsinia is ruled by the Austrian Empire. The hero is Itale Sorde, the son of the owner of an estate on a lake called Malafrena in a valley of the same name. Itale leaves the estate, against his father's will, to engage in nationalistic and revolutionary politics in the capital.

== Characters ==
- Itale Sorde: The protagonist of the story.
- Laura Sorde: Itale's sister.
- Guide Sorde: Itale's father.
- Emanuel Sorde: Itale's uncle.
- Eleonora: Itale's mother.
- Tomas Brelavay: School friend and collaborator in Krasnoy.
- Givan Frenin: School friend and collaborator in Krasnoy.
- Count Orlant Valtorskar: Neighbor and family friend.
- Piera Valtorskar: Neighbor and family friend.
- Luisa Paludeskar: A young noble woman in Krasnoy.
- Enrike Paludeskar: Luisa's brother.
- Amadey Estenskar: A writer from Polana province.

== Literary significance and criticism ==
Mike Cadden notes that Malafrena has not received as much critical attention as many of le Guin's other works, primarily because the characters in the story do not connect well with one another. An imperceptible, omniscient author is used to tell the story, and le Guin herself acknowledges one of the strongest influences on her Orsinian works is Russian literature.

In a review of Malafrena, Greg Costikyan commented that

"Malafrena seems to say that visionaries are often or usually destroyed, and though tragic, this must always be the case, for humanity cannot progress without them."
