= Annals of the Western Shore =

Book series by Ursula K. Le Guin

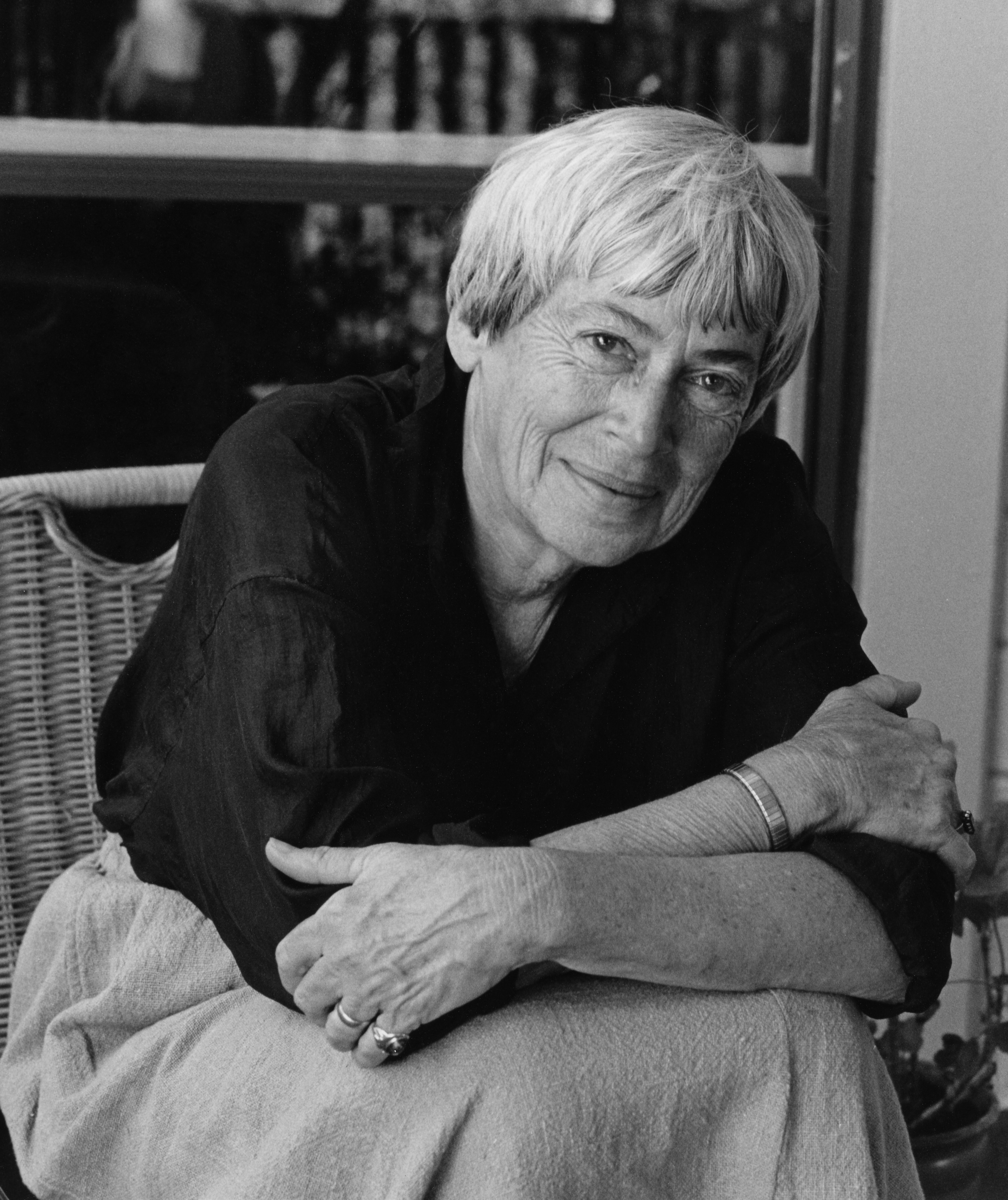
Author Ursula K. Le Guin in 1995

Annals of the Western Shore is a young adult fantasy series by Ursula K. Le Guin. It consists of three books: Gifts (2004), Voices (2006), and Powers (2007). Each book has different main characters and settings, but the books are linked by some recurring characters and locations. Gifts won the PEN Center USA 2005 Children's literature award. Powers won the 2008 Nebula Award for Best Novel.

== Setting ==
The civilization of the Annals of the Western Shore is in a fertile region on the western shore of a continental land mass. The land was settled by people from across a desert to the east of the regions depicted in the series. The civilization consists of a number of city states, as well as some nomads on the borders of the desert. Human habitations are scattered, and civilization is approximately medieval. A small set of people bear hereditary magical gifts.

Gifts is set in the Uplands, in the far north of this region, a barren and poverty-stricken area isolated from the rest of the world. The Uplands are divided into a number of domains whose leaders have powerful hereditary magical gifts. The families must marry within their own lineage to maintain the gift, which is frequently difficult, as the Uplands are sparsely populated. The narrator Orrec is from the domain of Caspromant, where the hereditary gift is the power of "unmaking", which can kill or destroy at a glance; his friend Gry is from the neighboring domain of Roddmant, and her lineage has the ability to call animals. The society they live in has no laws or government, and its culture is shaped by feuds and battles between lineages.

Voices is set in the city of Ansul, in the southern region of the same world. The city was once famous as "Ansul the wise and beautiful", a center of learning with a renowned library and university. Ten years before the story told in Voices the city, which has no military, was attacked by a desert people known as the Alds, who broke into the city looting and raping before being expelled. After a year-long siege, the Alds conquered the city. Memer Galva, the protagonist of the story, lives in the house of the "Waylord" of Ansul, whose house of Galvamand is the oldest in the city, and conceals a wealth of books and the mystic "Oracle". The Waylord was imprisoned and tortured by the Alds, and was crippled when released. Under the Alds the city has become greatly impoverished and many of its residents are enslaved. Powers begins in the city of Etra, whose political structure is similar to that of the Roman Republic. The wealthy families keep slaves, of whom the protagonist, Gavir, is one. Slaves are not allowed to keep their children, and slaves are thus considered not to have ancestors.

The main religion of the Western Shore has three main deities: Ennu, who is portrayed as a Lion and is said to guide souls into the after life; Luck, who rides across the sky in a chariot pulling the sun; and Sampa the Destroyer. People in the city states pray to their ancestors. The religion of the Desert Alds, who believe that there is only one true god, Atth the god of fire, and that those who survive burns are holy. Their religion led them to invade Ansul because they thought that the Anti-Atth resided around that area; they believed themselves right when they found the great Library of Ansul, because they believe that demons hide within script. They threw all the books and their owners into the harbour because they burn only holy things.

== Synopsis ==
Gifts centers on two young people, Gry and Orrec, who struggle to come to terms with inherent psychic abilities. They live in a poor, mountainous, and culturally backward region, famous for its "witches" and wonder-workers. Gry is a girl who can communicate with animals; she refuses to use her gift to aid hunters, which sets her apart from many in her culture, including her own mother. Orrec is a boy whose supposed gift of "unmaking" is apparently so dangerous that he voluntarily goes through life blindfolded, to avoid causing destruction. The story tells of how Orrec and Gry cope with their gifts, and eventually leave their mountainous home for the wider world.

Voices tells the story of Memer, a girl who lives in an occupied city. Her home, Ansul, has been conquered by the Alds, a desert people from the east, who are now its brutal and superstitious occupiers. Memer is a "siege brat", a child born during the siege to a mother raped by an Ald soldier. She learns of a world of suppressed books and writings that is her inheritance as a resident of the house of the Waylord. She meets Gry and Orrec, who come to Ansul as travelling storytellers. Their respective powers become important to the political struggle of Ansul and the Alds, and to its eventual resolution.

In Powers, Gavir is a slave who develops a gift for precognition. Gavir and his sister Sallo are of the Rassiu, or marsh people, kidnapped as children by slave-takers. They are raised in the household of Arcamand alongside the children of the Arca family that owns them. Gavir is trained to serve as a teacher for a noble family in the city of Etra. The rape and murder of his sister drives him to escape from his ostensibly comfortable life. He wanders the countryside, encountering runaway slaves and living for a time with the people he was stolen from as a child. Pursued by a slave-taker, he seeks to escape to a new life in a university town, where he meets Memer, Gry, and Orrec.

== Themes ==
Themes explored across the trilogy include slavery, justice, and the place of women in society. The power of reading and storytelling are also featured prominently in the Annals, with each protagonist having a love of books and story. Though they share a setting, the trilogy's three books are only loosely related: instead each follows the coming of age of its protagonist, their journey through literal or metaphorical slavery, and the eventual discovery of their calling. Like the other protagonists of the Annals, Gavir's magical powers do not greatly benefit him, and he must find a place where he is also intellectually free. Gavir's physical journey to liberation (which depicts of a slave escaping to freedom across a river, an image featured prominently in Uncle Tom's Cabin) is concurrent with his coming of age and the choices he makes as he learns to live a free life. He is unable to find solace among his own people, as their rigid society is too confining for him. Like Memer in Voices, he eventually finds his place with Orrec and Gry in the University town of Mesun, where he can use his gift for letters.

== Publication and reception ==
Gifts was published in September 2004 by Harcourt, followed by Voices in 2006 and Powers in 2007. Le Guin suggested in an interview in 2012 that she had faced pressure from her publisher to make the series "more like Harry Potter", but that she tried to resist the pressure. Gifts won the PEN Center USA 2005 Children's literature award. Voices was a Locus Award finalist in the Best Young Adult Book category in 2007. Powers won the Nebula Award for Best Novel, given by the Science Fiction and Fantasy Writers Association for science fiction or fantasy novels. It was also a finalist for the Endeavour Award, and, like Voices, for the Locus Award for Best Young Adult Book.

Annals has been described as part of a renaissance in Le Guin's writing in the mid-2000s, beginning with the publication of the collection The Birthday of the World and Other Stories in 2002. According to Jo Walton, Le Guin's writing of the 1980s and 1990s was revisiting earlier work and settings, but sometimes prioritizing message over story: but Walton described Annals and other contemporaneous works as a "new island of stability", in which the themes, including gender and power, were "fully integrated into the underlying geology" of the books. Literature scholar Mike Cadden has stated that the novel represented Le Guin's return to young adult fantasy, to a genre where she has the "greatest moral force." A 2019 analysis described the series as a "mature, highly introspective work", but stated that it had received surprisingly little critical attention relative to the continued popularity of Le Guin's Earthsea series.

Gifts received positive reviews for its themes, style, and characterization of its protagonists. The Portland Oregonian wrote that Le Guin's depiction of greed and misused power was "timeless as well as timely, and ha[d] the deep, lasting ring of truth that makes for well-loved, enduring young adult literature." The online speculative fiction magazine Tor.com compared Gifts to an old fairytale, stating that it had the "power of something told and retold". Reviewers wrote that Le Guin's description of Orrec's blindness was "fiercely real", and that her prose had a poetic or lyrical quality to it. The exploration of the consequences of power and the coming of age themes has been described as insightful and provocative, while the construction of the story, and the Orrec and Gry's gradual understanding of the consequences of their choices, were also praised. A review in Horn Book Magazine stated that the twain were "unique, thoughtful young rebels". The review used Le Guin's own words to describe her prose, writing that she "talked like a little stream running, clearly and merrily, with the Lowland softness and fluency."

Voices received critical acclaim for its worldbuilding, style, and exploration of political and religious themes. A review for the Center for Children's Books described Le Guin's alternative universe as "utterly credible", while science fiction fan magazine Strange Horizons applauded Le Guin's avoidance of fantasy tropes, such as by creating a nuanced portrait of the Alds. Multiple reviews compared the book to Fahrenheit 451 by Ray Bradbury, which also prominently features the destruction of books by an oppressive authority. The Sydney Morning Herald stated that though Le Guin's work was "at once more concrete and more ethereal than the Bradbury", and wrote that Voices was a "deeply felt meditation on family, country, beauty, culture and courage." The book also received praise for exploring religious themes without interrogating or embracing Christian imagery, as much other fantasy does.

== Bibliography ==
- Anderson, Elizabeth (June 2016). "Ursula Le Guin and Theological Alterity" (PDF). Literature & Theology. 30 (2): 182–197. doi:10.1093/litthe/frw018. hdl:1893/23045.
- Cadden, Mike (2006). "Taking Different Roads to the City: The Development of Ursula K. Le Guin's Young Adult Novels". Extrapolation. 47 (3): 427–444. doi:10.3828/extr.2006.47.3.7.
- Covarr, Fiona (2015). "Hybridity, Third Spaces and Identities in Ursula Le Guin's Voices". Mousaion. 33 (2): 128–139. doi:10.25159/0027-2639/179. hdl:2263/51613.
- Le Guin, Ursula K. (2015). Gifts. Hachette. ISBN 9781473206007.
- Le Guin, Ursula K. (2009). Powers. Graphia. ISBN 9780152066741.
- Le Guin, Ursula K. (2008). Voices. Orlando, Florida: Harcourt Inc. ISBN 978-0-15-205678-0.
- Lindow, Sandra J. (2006). "Wild Gifts: Anger management and moral development in the fiction of Ursula K. Le Guin and Maurice Sendak". Extrapolation. 47 (3): 445–456. doi:10.3828/extr.2006.47.3.8.
- Oziewicz, Marek C. (2011). "Restorative Justice Scripts in Ursula K. Le Guin's Voices". Children's Literature in Education. 42: 33–43. doi:10.1007/s10583-010-9118-8. S2CID 145122571.
- Rochelle, Warren G. (2006). "Choosing to be Human: American romantic/pragmatic rhetoric in Ursula K. Le Guin's teaching novel, Gifts". Extrapolation. 48 (1).
