= The Compass Rose =

1982 collection of short stories by Ursula K. Le Guin

- First limited, signed edition
- Author: Ursula K. Le Guin
- Illustrator: Thomas Canty (1983)
- Cover artist: Thomas Canty (1983)
- Language: English
- Genre: Fantasy
- Publisher: Pendragon Press
- Publication date: July 1982
- Publication place: United States
- Media type: Print (hardcover)
- Pages: 273 (first edition, hardback)
- ISBN: 0-06-014988-4
- OCLC: 8109967
- Dewey Decimal: 813/.54 19
- LC Class: PS3562.E42 C6 1982

The Compass Rose is a 1982 collection of short stories by American writer Ursula K. Le Guin, and illustrated by Anne Yvonne Gilbert in 1983. It is organized into sections on the theme of directions, though not strictly compass-related as the title implies.

It won the Locus Award for best Single Author Collection in 1983.

== Contents ==
- Preface

Nadir

- "'The Author of the Acacia Seeds' and Other Extracts from the Journal of the Association of Therolinguistics" (1974, Fellowship of the Stars)
- "The New Atlantis" (1975, The New Atlantis)
- "Schrödinger's Cat" (1974, Universe 5)

North

- "Two Delays on the Northern Line" (1979, The New Yorker)
- "SQ" (1978, Cassandra Rising)
- "Small Change" (1981, Tor zu den Sternen)

East

- "The First Report of the Shipwrecked Foreigner to the Kadanh of Derb" (1978, Antaeus)
- "The Diary of the Rose" (1976, Future Power)
- "The White Donkey" (1980, TriQuarterly)
- "The Phoenix"

Zenith

- "Intracom" (1974, Stopwatch)
- "The Eye Altering" (1974, The Altered I)
- "Mazes" (1975, Epoch)
- "The Pathways of Desire" (1979, New Dimensions Science Fiction, No. 9)

West

- "Gwilan's Harp" (1977, Redbook)
- "Malheur County" (1979, Kenyon Review)
- "The Water Is Wide" (1976, Pendragon Press (chapbook))

South

- "The Wife's Story"
- "Some Approaches to the Problem of the Shortage of Time" (1979, Omni, as "Where Does the Time Go?")
- "Sur" (1982, The New Yorker)

== Sources ==
- Cadden, Mike (2005). Ursula K. Le Guin Beyond Genre: Fiction for Children and Adults (1st ed.). New York, NY: Routledge. ISBN 0-415-99527-2.
