= Gifts (novel) =

2004 novel by Ursula K. Le Guin

- The cover of the first edition
- Author: Ursula K. Le Guin
- Language: English
- Series: Annals of the Western Shore
- Genre: Fantasy
- Publisher: Harcourt
- Publication date: 1 September 2004
- Pages: 274
- ISBN: 9780152051235
- Followed by: Voices

Gifts (2004) is a young adult fantasy novel by Ursula K. Le Guin. It is the first book in the Annals of the Western Shore trilogy, and is followed in the series by Voices. The story is set in a fictional world, in a barren and poverty-stricken region called the Uplands, some of whose inhabitants have hereditary magical gifts. The story follows the narrator Orrec, son of the leader of the domain of Caspromant, whose hereditary gift is the ability to "unmake", and Gry, the daughter of a neighboring domain, who can communicate with animals. Orrec's gift manifests late, and seems uncontrollable, and so he is blindfolded. Their families are caught up in the cycle of violent feuds and retribution that characterize Upland society in which the children are trying to find their place.

The novel explores themes of violence and the abuse of power, as well as of coming of age. The protagonists have a recurring struggle to make choices they are comfortable with. Their moral development takes place within the harshness of the Upland culture, contrasted with examples of kindness and altruism. It has been described as sharing themes of dreamworlds and choices with a number of other works by Le Guin, such as the Earthsea cycle, The Beginning Place, and "The Ones Who Walk Away from Omelas". It also shares similarities with Maurice Sendak's book Where the Wild Things Are, while Orrec's transformation in the novel has been compared to the biblical story of Jonah.

Gifts won the PEN Center USA 2005 Children's literature award. It was very well received by critics, who praised the characterization of Orrec and Gry as "unique, thoughtful young rebels". The writing of the book was also praised as being lyrical or poetic, while the themes of misused power and coming of age were also described positively.

== Setting ==
Gifts is set in the Uplands of the fictional universe of the Annals of the Western Shore. The civilization of this world was settled by people from across a desert to the east of the regions depicted in the series. The civilization consists of a number of city states, as well as some nomads on the borders of the desert. The Uplands are in the far north of this region, in a poverty-stricken area isolated from the rest of the world. It is a bleak and barren landscape, forcing its inhabitants to struggle for a living. The Uplands are divided into a number of domains, each held by a "brantor", or leader. These leaders have powerful magical gifts, which are hereditary, and which are used to protect their domains, as well as for other purposes. The families must marry within their own lineage to maintain the gift, which is frequently difficult, as the Uplands are sparsely populated. The narrator Orrec is from the domain of Caspromant, where the hereditary gift is the power of "unmaking", which can kill or destroy at a glance; his friend Gry is from the neighboring domain of Roddmant, and her lineage has the ability to call animals. The society they live in has no laws or government, and its culture is shaped by feuds and battles between lineages: violence is thus endemic to the region.

== Plot summary ==
The novel begins with Emmon, a lowland runaway, coming to Caspromant when Orrec and Gry are sixteen. The children tell Emmon of their gifts, though he is somewhat disbelieving of them. Orrec then narrates the history of his family from his childhood. His father Canoc is the brantor of Caspromant; his mother Melle, a woman from the lowlands. Despite living in the Uplands, Melle holds to some of her traditions, and teaches Orrec stories and lays that she had learned as a child. She also teaches him to read, an ability rare among Uplanders. Canoc also begins to instruct Orrec in the use of their power, though Orrec does not manifest any ability as a child. Orrec and Gry, of a similar age, become good friends, and Gry begins to show her power, being able to listen to the speech of cats and mice.

When he is thirteen, Orrec seemingly becomes able to use his power, striking an adder dead when it was about to bite his father. However, he is troubled by the ability not feeling different from his past unsuccessful efforts at using it. His father asks him to try, suggesting that Orrec has a duty to use his power to protect the domain, but Orrec refuses. A few days later Ogge Drum, the brantor of the neighboring domain of Drummant, comes to Caspromant, inviting the Caspros to his home, and suggesting that Orrec be betrothed to his granddaughter. Although wary of Drum due to their longstanding enmity, Canoc agrees to visit. Melle expresses opposition to the betrothal: Orrec is hurt because he and Gry had assumed they would marry each other. Canoc once again asks Orrec to use his power; Orrec is initially unable, but as his frustration builds, he seemingly turns an entire hillside into desolation. Terrified at his lack of control over his "wild" gift, he blindfolds himself.

The Caspros visit Drummant, but Ogge is rude to them, and the granddaughter Ogge proposed to betroth to Orrec is found to be mentally disabled. After they return, Melle falls ill, and Orrec assumes that Ogge used his gift of setting a wasting sickness on her. As Melle gets slowly weaker, she asks Orrec to retell her stories, leading him to realize he has a gift for storytelling and poetry. Orrec also develops a bond with Coaly, a guide dog trained for him by Gry. On her deathbed, Melle asks to see Orrec's eyes one last time, so he removes his blindfold, and realizes that his love for Melle would never have let him hurt her. Orrec begins to secretly remove his blindfold to read his books, and once looks at Coaly accidentally without hurting her. He realizes that he never had the gift of unmaking; his father had performed all of the acts attributed to him, and had pretended that Orrec had a "wild" gift to frighten people into leaving his domain alone. He confronts his father, and stops wearing a blindfold. Soon after, Ogge leads a raid against Roddmant. Canoc kills Ogge and his son while defending it, thus avenging his wife, and is killed himself. Orrec and Gry decide that there is no future for them in the uplands, because Gry is unwilling to use her gift to call animals to be hunted, and Orrec's gift of poetry is of no use there. They join Caspromant to Roddmant, and leave the uplands to make a new life elsewhere.

== Main characters ==
=== Orrec ===
The story is narrated by Orrec Caspro, the son of Canoc, master of the domain of Caspromant. The gift that his family possesses is the ability to "unmake" things, but his gift seems to manifest very late, and he is unable to control it. Later he seems to strike down his pet dog, and then destroy an entire hillside with his power. He decides the death was his fault, and horrified by the thought of his power out of control, demands that he be blindfolded. Orrec's battles with his power and its potential to destroy have been described as an example of a person's confrontation with their own shadow, a common theme in Le Guin's writing. The blindfold initially brings him some peace. Unable to see the real world, he lives within the stories that Melle has told him, Eventually he begins to retell the stories to his mother, and to add to them himself. When Melle asks to see his face without the blindfold one last time, he realizes he couldn't have hurt her, and feels the "dry fury of impotent regret." After his mother's death he descends into grief and rage, which he eventually emerges from with Gry's assistance. At Gry's suggestion he begins to remove his blindfold to read the books his mother writes for him. Orrec comes to realizes that his father has unintentionally tricked him into believing in his wild gift, so as to protect his domain. He confronts his father Orrec eventually realizes that he prefers "making" to unmaking. Gry and he get married, and leave the Uplands. Scholar Sandra Lindow has pointed out that Orrec's name is similar to "auric", meaning "related to hearing", and that it brings to mind the word "oracle", describing his discovery of his power to create and perform. Orrec's emotional journey during his blindfoldment has been compared to that of the biblical character Jonah, as well as to that of Max in the Maurice Sendak children's picture book Where the Wild Things Are.

=== Gry ===
Gry Barre is the daughter of the brantor of the neighboring domain of Roddmant, and Orrec's friend. Lindow describes her as representing "all that is good in the Upland culture". Her gift is the ability to communicate with animals; while still a child she is able to hear the speech of animals in the farms, and later she trains Coaly, a guide dog for Orrec. She refuses to use her gift to call animals to be hunted, and is depicted as edgy and resolute. Despite being young, she is depicted as caring deeply for other beings, She visits Orrec in his despair, and persuades him to tell her stories, drawing him out of his grief through his gift for poetry. After she marries Orrec and the two decide to leave, she says "We might go as far as the ocean shore", suggesting that though the Uplands have become too limiting for them, their development is not complete.

== Publication and reception ==
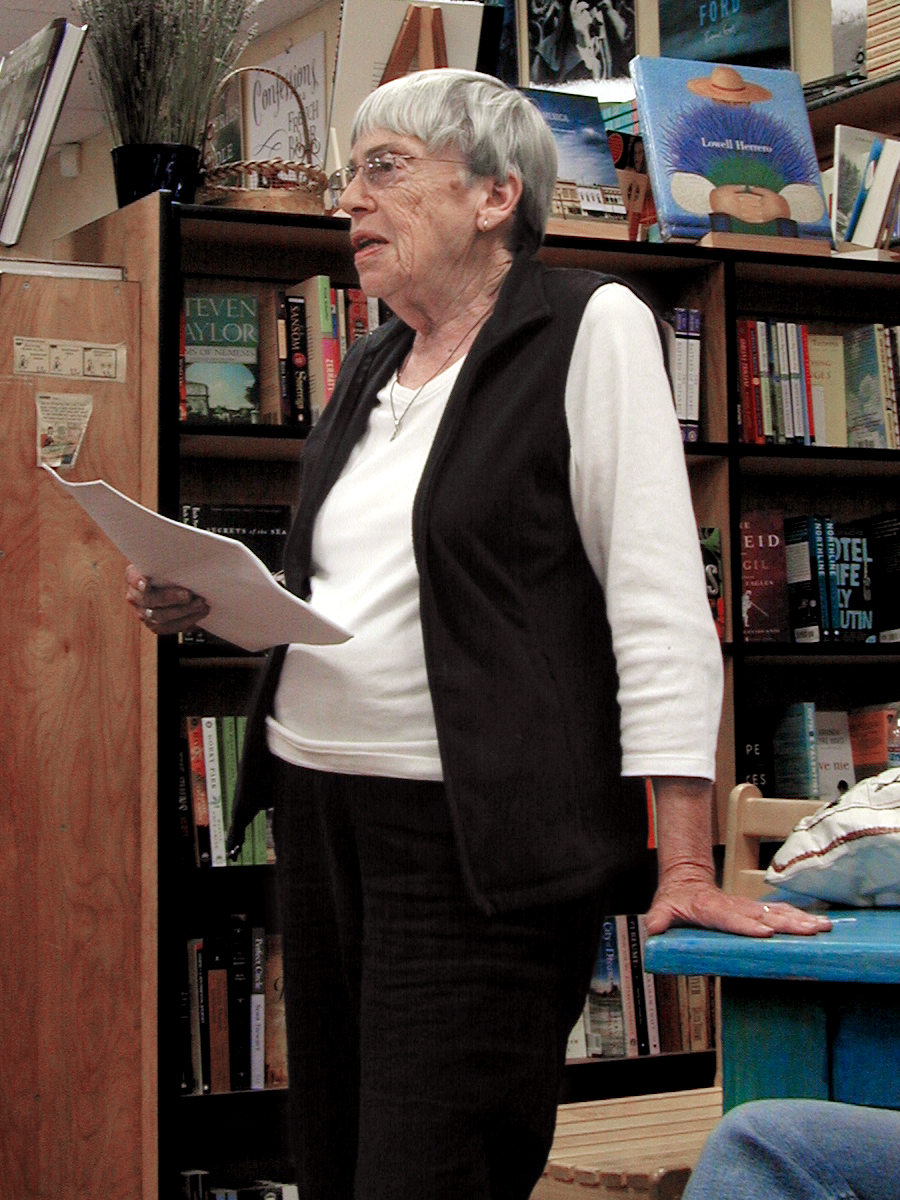
Ursula K. Le Guin, pictured giving a reading in 2008. Gifts has been described as representing a return to young adult fantasy in her writing.

Gifts was published on 1 September 2004 by Harcourt. It was the first volume of the Annals of the Western Shore trilogy, and was followed by Voices in 2006 and Powers in 2007. Le Guin suggested in an interview in 2012 that she had faced pressure from her publisher to make the series "more like Harry Potter", but that she tried to resist the pressure. Gifts won the PEN Center USA 2005 Children's literature award. The book was written as young adult fiction, and was marketed at children aged twelve and above, although reviewers stated that older readers would also enjoy it. Literature scholar Mike Cadden has stated that the novel represented Le Guin's return to young adult fantasy, to a genre where she has the "greatest moral force."

The novel had a strongly positive critical reception. Some reviewers praised the themes of the novel: the Portland Oregonian wrote that Le Guin's depiction of greed and misused power was "timeless as well as timely, and ha[d] the deep, lasting ring of truth that makes for well-loved, enduring young adult literature." Kirkus Reviews stated that the "ending was a little tidy", but that the story was compelling, and "getting-there that provides this offering’s greatest reward".

Other commentators gave the style of the work a positive reception. A review in the online speculative fiction magazine Tor.com compared Gifts to an old fairytale, stating that it had the "power of something told and retold". Reviewers wrote that Le Guin's description of Orrec's blindness was "fiercely real", and that her prose had a poetic or lyrical quality to it. The exploration of the consequences of power and the coming of age themes has been described as insightful and provocative, while the construction of the story, and the Orrec and Gry's gradual understanding of the consequences of their choices, were also praised.

The characterization of Orrec and Gry was well received. A review in Horn Book Magazine stated that the twain were "unique, thoughtful young rebels". Their struggles were described as having philosophical aspects that nonetheless did not dominate the story. The review used Le Guin's own words to describe her prose, writing that she "talked like a little stream running, clearly and merrily, with the Lowland softness and fluency." Cadden, writing in 2006, stated that the characters were drawn in a manner relevant to young adults, and that it was Le Guin's most satisfying work of young adult fiction. Another reviewer said that Gifts had the "earthy magic and intelligent plot twists" of the Earthsea Cycle, and that the book was a "gift in the purest sense."

== Themes ==
The Annals have a number of themes common across the series, including power, responsibility, slavery, and the place of women in society. The series has been described as part of a renaissance in Le Guin's work since the publishing of The Birthday of the World in 2002, in which the underlying plot of the novel was not subsumed by socially relevant themes. The writings of Carl Jung were influential in the work of Ursula Le Guin. Many of Le Guin's writings feature young people trying to find a sense of community in circumstances of lawlessness and disorder. The Uplands are depicted as a region of chaos, and according to scholar Sandra Lindow, a place of low moral development, dominated by vicious feuds. Lindow describes similarities between Gifts and Le Guin's other works A Wizard of Earthsea and Buffalo Girls, both of which feature eyesight as a motif. Conversely, Orrec's blindness has been compared to the "Dreamworlds" that other characters in Le Guin's novels enter as a part of their process of growing up, such as the labyrinth of The Tombs of Atuan for Ged and the dream portal in The Beginning Place. The experiences within these Dreamworlds then help the characters adapt to their real world when they return. Cadden describes Orrec's journey as the opposite of Ged's in A Wizard of Earthsea; while the latter discovers his true power in moving from the mundane world to the magical, Orrec is able to realize his true power when he gives up the "false power" of his reputation.

=== Coming of age ===
In describing the premise of the novel, Le Guin stated "the hero of the book, the protagonist, he has a different gift, it isn’t magic at all, in fact, it’s another kind of talent. And his problem is to realize that he doesn’t have the kind he’s supposed to have, he has this other one. Which is a problem, actually, a lot of young people face: What is my gift?" Reviewers have described Orrec's search for his own identity, in contrast to the identity that has been thrust upon him, as one of the major themes of the novel. Orrec's growth is related to the novel's other major theme of power and responsibility. As he comes to terms with his identity, Orrec questions whether he is betraying his power by refusing to try to use it. Gry, too, is unwilling to use her gift to call animals to be hunted, and wonders whether "all the gifts are backward.... They could have been healing, to begin with." The novel ends with the two protagonists realizing that they are unwilling to remain in the cycle of violence and retribution in the Uplands, and leaving to keep their integrity; but they are also running toward a place where they can use their gifts as they please, rather than simply running away. A part of Orrec and Gry's process of growing up is to see beyond the binary choices they are presented with by society. Orrec is faced with a choice of whether to use his power, or to be blindfolded; Gry has to use her power to hunt, or not. Gry realizes that all of the upland powers can be used in two ways: for control and dominion, or for healing and nurturing. This recognition allows them to take a third choice, and leave. This wrestling with choice has been compared to the choices the characters are forced to make in Le Guin's novella The Ones Who Walk Away from Omelas.

=== Power and violence ===
Le Guin described the role of magic in the novel in the following manner: "in Gifts, the powers of magic are kind of warped. They are mostly used aggressively and destructively and defensively, actually. You know, it’s like having that secret weapon that they use against each other. It’s all gone kind of sour." The characters in the novel often fail to understand the responsibility that goes along with their power; only by the end of the story do Orrec and Gry come to terms with their gifts, and understand the best way to use them. Orrec's power is misunderstood for much of the novel: he has inherited his mother's ability to tell stories, rather than his father's ability to unmake things. However, he also has power in his reputation, as a person to be feared. Much of the novel is concerned with the abuse of power, and the problems with following without thinking of consequences, as well as the violence that is contained in the Upland society. Orrec's father Canoc does not hesitate to use his power for his own ends: his wife Melle was taken in a raid, over the course of which Canoc slew another man. He nonetheless shows more forethought than some of the other characters in the novel, and actually asks Melle to be his wife; he also gives gifts to her town in return. Melle's stories form an important part of the children's morality, featuring as they do a number of characters exhibiting kindness and altruism, in contrast to the Upland culture. The violence within the Upland society is exemplified in the person of Ogge Drum, who is depicted as a thief and a bully. He lusts after Melle, and kills her with his gift when he realizes he cannot have her.

== Sources ==
- Cadden, Mike (2006). "Taking Different Roads to the City: The Development of Ursula K. Le Guin's Young Adult Novels". Extrapolation. 47 (3): 427–444. doi:10.3828/extr.2006.47.3.7.
- Le Guin, Ursula K. (2015). Gifts. Hachette. ISBN 9781473206007.
- Lindow, Sandra J. (2006). "Wild Gifts: Anger management and moral development in the fiction of Ursula K. Le Guin and Maurice Sendak". Extrapolation. 47 (3): 445–456. doi:10.3828/extr.2006.47.3.8.
- Rochelle, Warren G. (2006). "Choosing to be Human: American romantic/pragmatic rhetoric in Ursula K. Le Guin's teaching novel, Gifts". Extrapolation. 48 (1).
