= Cat Dreams =

Children's picture book by Ursula K. Le Guin and S D Schindler

- Author: Ursula K. Le Guin
- Illustrator: S D Schindler
- Cover artist: Schindler
- Language: English
- Genre: Children's picture book
- Published: 2009 (Orchard Books/Scholastic, Inc.)
- Publication place: United States of America
- Media type: Print (hardback)
- Pages: 32 (unpaginated)
- ISBN: 9780545042161
- OCLC: 271647107

Cat Dreams is a 2009 children's picture book by Ursula K. Le Guin and illustrated by S D Schindler. It is about a cat that has a nap, dreams of fantastical kitty things, like raining mice, is startled awake, then finds a nice human lap to snooze on.

== Reception ==
Kirkus Reviews wrote of Cat Dreams "Easy rhyming text will be quickly memorized, but the realistic, full-bleed watercolor illustrations will keep youngsters turning the pages.", and concluded "A perfect fit for storytimes on cats, naps and dreams."

Cat Dreams has also been reviewed by Publishers Weekly, Common Sense Media, Children's Book and Media Review, Booklist, School Library Journal, and Horn Book Guides.
