= Cheek by Jowl (book) =

Book by Ursula K. Le Guin

- Author: Ursula K. Le Guin
- Language: English
- Publisher: Aqueduct Press
- Publication date: 2009

Cheek by Jowl is a 2009 collection of eight essays and talks written by American author Ursula K. Le Guin and published by Aqueduct Press.

== Overview ==
Cheek by Jowl collects several of LeGuin's essays on the importance and criticism of fantasy literature. The title essay, comprising half the book, surveys the representation of animals in children's literature, arguing that the best literature discusses animals from their own, non-human, perspective. LeGuin furthermore argues that fantasy literature offers new ways of conceiving reality in opposition to the "monstrous homogenization of our world," offering "nothing unfamiliar." The book decries the reduction of literature, particularly children's literature, to communication of messages or "sermons." Some essays are critical of classic children's works such as Watership Down (which she considered sexist), and His Dark Materials.

On the other hand, LeGuin presents arguments sympathetic to J. R. R. Tolkien, Rudyard Kipling, and Lewis Carroll's Through the Looking-Glass.

== See also ==
- Ursula K. Le Guin
