= Voices (Le Guin novel) =

2006 book by Ursula Le Guin

- Author: Ursula K. Le Guin
- Language: English
- Series: Annals of the Western Shore
- Genre: Fantasy
- Publisher: Harcourt
- Publication date: September 1, 2006
- ISBN: 978-0-15-205678-0
- Preceded by: Gifts
- Followed by: Powers

Voices (2006) is the second book in the trilogy Annals of the Western Shore, a young adult fantasy series by Ursula K. Le Guin. It is preceded in the series by Gifts (2004) and followed by Powers (2007). The story is set in the fictional city of Ansul, once famed as a center of learning, but invaded and subjugated by the Alds, a desert people who believe the written word to be evil. The protagonist, Memer Galva, is the child of a woman raped by an Ald soldier. She lives in the house of the Waylord Sulter Galva, who teaches her to read after finding she can enter the house's hidden library. When Memer is seventeen the city is visited by Gry and Orrec, the protagonists of Gifts; Orrec is now a famous poet, invited to perform by the Alds. Their arrival catalyzes an uprising against the Alds, while Memer tries to come to terms with her ability to interpret the Oracle that resides in her house.

Voices examines the cultural and religious strife between the monotheistic beliefs of the Alds and the polytheistic practices of the citizens of Ansul. Described as a "plea for cultural relativity", the novel also juxtaposes violent and non-violent means of ending a conflict. As with the other stories of Annals of the Western Shore, Voices examines enslavement and the treatment of women, and the theme of justice. The story traces Memer's coming of age, and the power of words, stories, and writing is a recurring theme. The book received acclaim from critics, who praised its nuanced portrayal of religion and cultural conflict, the characterization of Memer, and Le Guin's writing and detailed world building. Multiple reviewers compared it to Fahrenheit 451 by Ray Bradbury, also prominently featuring the destruction of books. Voices was a finalist for a Locus Award in 2007. Scholar Elizabeth Anderson wrote that the book "[encouraged] young adult readers to imaginatively approach their own encounters with religious difference."

== Setting ==
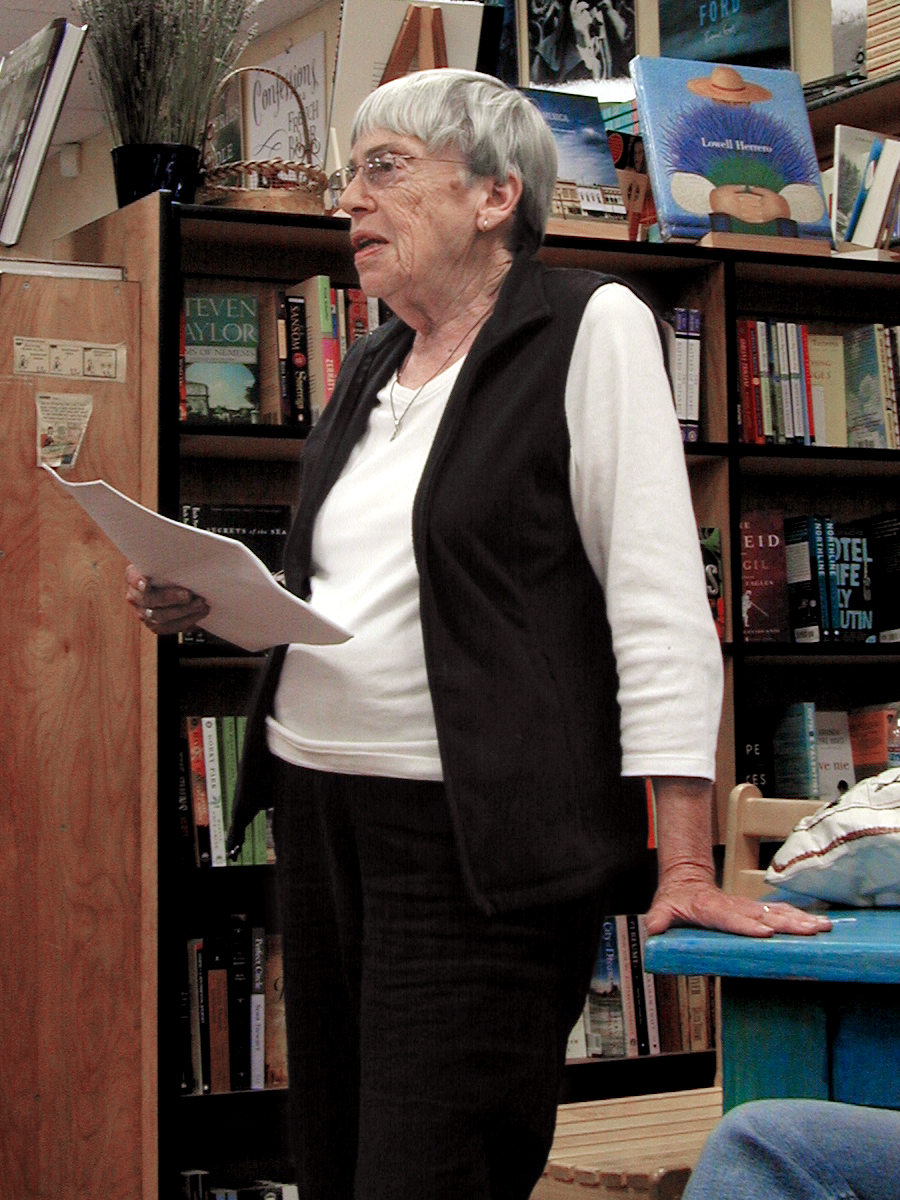
The author giving a reading in 2008

Voices is the second volume of Annals of the Western Shore, following Gifts (2004). Gifts told the story of Gry and Orrec, who grew up in Uplands in the far north of the fictional world depicted in the series. Violence is endemic to the region, leading the couple to leave home and make their future elsewhere. Voices is set in the city of Ansul, in the southern region of the same world. The civilization of this world was settled by people from across a desert to the east of the regions depicted in the series. It consists of a number of city states, as well as some nomads on the borders of the desert. The city of Ansul was once famous as "Ansul the wise and beautiful", a center of learning with a renowned library and university. Situated on the shore of a bay, the city is named for a mountain it faces across the water.

Ten years before the story told in Voices the city, which has no military, was attacked by a desert people known as the Alds, who broke into the city looting and raping before being expelled. After a year-long siege, the Alds conquered the city. Memer Galva, the protagonist of the story, is a "siege brat", a child born during the siege to a mother raped by an Ald soldier. Memer's mother Decalo was head housekeeper to the "Waylord" of Ansul, who arranges trade between Ansul and its neighbors; his house of Galvamand is the oldest in the city, and is among the largest and wealthiest as well. Decalo died soon after giving birth to Memer. The Waylord, Sulter Galva, was imprisoned and tortured, and was crippled when released. Under the Alds the city has become greatly impoverished and many of its residents are enslaved.

== Plot ==
The story begins with Memer narrating her earliest memory: of entering a secret room filled with books, to which the door may only be opened by making shapes on the wall. Memer believes she is the only who knows how to get in, until she finds the Waylord there when she is nine years old. He offers to teach her to read, after swearing her to secrecy. Memer proves to be a quick learner. Four days after her seventeenth birthday, Memer makes the acquaintance of Orrec and Gry, the protagonists of Gifts. Orrec, famous as a poet and storyteller, has been invited to Ansul to perform: Memer invites him and Gry to stay at Galvamand. They tell the Waylord that though the Alds invited them to Ansul, they came to find Galvamand, for the ancient library rumored to have once existed there. Orrec questions Memer about the history of the city: she tells him that Galvamand used to be known as the Oracle house, and realizes she does not know why.

Dressed as a male groom, Memer attends one of Orrec's performance for the Gand, the leader of the Alds. Orrec, holding no belief in the Ald god, is not allowed within the Gand's residence, but performs before an open pavilion. The relationship between the Gand Iorath and his son Iddor is seen to be tense: Iddor believes Orrec's poetry to be blasphemy. Some of Ansul's citizens, led by Sulter's friend Desac, hope to rouse the city against the Alds, taking advantage of the struggle between the Gand and his son. Desac asks Orrec to act as an instigator for a rebellion. When Orrec hesitates, the Waylord offers to consult the Oracle, revealed to still be in the house, about a rebellion. He tells Memer that their family has the responsibility of "reading" the Oracle, which provides answers in the pages of certain books in the secret room. He asks the Oracle about the rebellion: Memer sees the phrase "Broken mend broken" in a book in response.

The Waylord tells Orrec that he hopes to persuade the Alds to leave peacefully. Orrec offers to help him negotiate with the Gand. After another of Orrec's performances, Desac and his rebels set the Gand's tent on fire, sparking sporadic fighting across the city through the following night. A number of the conspirators, including Desac, are killed in the fire. Sulter learns that the Gand is not dead, but held prisoner by Iddor. A number of fugitives run to Galvamand, followed by Ald soldiers and Iddor, who claims to be the Gand. The Waylord announces that Iorath is still alive, and the Oracle speaks through Memer, crying "Let them set free". The soldiers abandon Iddor and return to the palace, where they release Iorath. Iorath orders his soldiers to stand down and allows the citizens inside their palace. Iddor is seized and imprisoned.

The Alds retreat to the barracks, and the citizens make plans for governing Ansul. During these debates Ald soldiers are seen approaching the city. Memer disguises herself as a boy and goes to meet Iorath, where she learns that the troop is not an army, but only carries a message. She returns to Galvamand with an offer from them to make Ansul a protectorate, rather than a colony. Memer gifts Orrec one of the books from the secret room, and she and Sulter decide to make a library with the books there. After a conversation with Gry, Memer decides to travel with her and Orrec for a while.

== Themes ==
Annals of the Western Shore has a number of themes common across the series, including power, responsibility, slavery, justice, and the place of women in society. Each of the novels also describes the coming of age of its protagonists, and features explorations of being enslaved to one's own power as well: as with Orrec in Gifts, Memer is initially afraid of her power to consult the Oracle. Memer's coming of age is explored partly in relation to her coming to terms with the Oracle, a process scholars have referred to as an analog for sexual maturity.

The writings of Carl Jung were influential in Le Guin's work. In an essay discussing his impact, Le Guin stated that to find a true sense of community, a child had to confront the unexplored parts of its own self, or what Jung referred to as the "collective unconscious". Thus many of her writings feature young people trying to find a sense of community in circumstances of lawlessness and disorder. Voices depicts characters who are unable to explore their identities due to the oppressive regime they live under, an inability which particularly affects the young characters. Another recurring theme in Voices is the power of words and storytelling, illustrated through the character of Orrec, who uses his poetry to spread ideas of freedom. The title "Voices" has multiple interpretations: the voices of the poets that are frequently referred to, the voice of the Oracle, the voices of the people of Ansul who rise up against the Alds, and the voice of Memer herself.

=== Cultural conflict ===
The conflict between the culture of the Alds and that of Ansul features through the story. The Alds emphasize their perceived cultural superiority to control the city, a practice commentators have described as common in colonialism. The movement of women, in particular, is very restricted: Memer and Gry must dress as men in order to roam the streets. Yet the prejudices of the Alds also allow Gry and Memer to subvert their laws: Gry suggests that because the Alds see women and "unbelievers" as inferior, they will be unable to recognize her for what she is. The supposed superiority of the Alds' beliefs affects Memer as well. As a child she ventures into the far end of the secret room, where the Oracle books are kept, and sees one of them oozing blood. Though she tries to rationalize her fear away by likening it to the Alds' fear of books, she also questions her own position as the reader of the Oracle, asking Sulter whether there are in fact demons within the room, as the Alds maintain.

Memer in turn has a deep hatred of the Alds, vowing "I will always hate the Alds, and I will drive them out of Ansul, and kill them all if I can". Her anger arises from the enslavement of her city and the hurt done to her loved ones, but also from her mixed heritage: in anger she often refers to herself in derogatory terms such as "half-breed". Her hatred prevents her from engaging with the Alds in any way: she continually refers to them in a negative manner, and when it is suggested that she attend Orrec's performance for the Gand, is initially reluctant because she wants nothing to do with them. Thus she rejects the Alds in a manner ultimately similar to their rejection of the culture and belief of Ansul. Yet by the end of the story Memer grows into an acceptance of the Alds and the notion of coexistence with them, even as she grows into her own identity as the reader of the Oracle.

Voices has been described as a depiction of how culture may persist despite authoritarian attempts to end it, and as such to make a "plea for cultural relativity". The idea of cultural openness is illustrated by the character of Tirio Actamo: once a well-known citizen of Ansul who was taken to be the concubine of the Gand, she then wins his love and uses her position to bring about an end to the conflict. Scholar Marek Oziewicz identified the story as critiquing the notion of retributive justice, considered the norm in Western societies, and instead supporting the idea of restorative justice. The protagonists of Voices succeed in "making things right" without punitive action. According to Oziewicz, the central question of the story is one that Memer asks the Oracle: "How can we be free of the Alds?" The answer is not a bloody revolution, but a compromise, possible because both parties are willing to recognize and end the conflict. Desac symbolizes the idea of retributive action, which is more emotionally satisfying but ultimately unsuccessful, while Orrec offers the more difficult, but successful method.

=== Religion ===
Voices explores religion through the contrasting beliefs of the Alds and the citizens of Ansul, and has been described as a story of religious conflict. The Alds have a single deity, and are led by a king who is also a high priest. They believe books and written words to be evil, and the work of the "Other Lord"; their invasion of Ansul was on the pretext of destroying this evil. Thus after conquering the city they loot homes looking for books and destroying them; they also kill people suspected of preserving books, and empty the famed library. Scholars have described their motivations as "religious fanaticism", and have suggested that the depiction of the "single-mindedness" of the Alds is a subtle critique of monotheism and imperialism.

The beliefs of the Alds are also contrasted with those of the citizens of Ansul, whose religion is polytheistic and emphasizes the veneration of ancestors. Little shrines and temples are commonplace, and the citizens frequently engage in worship, or asking for blessing. The religion has both major deities and spirits that inhabit houses or even rooms. Though many of the temples and shrines have been destroyed, the residents of Ansul hold on to their beliefs. The depiction of a polytheistic religion and a critique of monotheism is a recurring feature of Le Guin's work: in contrast to an omniscient and ever-present God, the deities of Ansul are closely linked to the material world and the daily lives of people. Memer comments that "the sea, the earth, the stones of Ansul are sacred, are alive with divinity". The beliefs of Ansul have been described as a "polytheist and animist version of panentheism", while the presence of ancestor worship has been likened to practices in Confucianism and Buddhism.

Through the depiction of the polytheism of Ansul, Le Guin suggests that their beliefs make them more tolerant of religious difference. The Alds refer to those who do not believe in their god as heathens. Memer, however, thinks to herself that "If [the word heathen] meant anything, it meant people who don’t know what’s sacred. Are there any such people? 'Heathen' is merely a word for somebody who knows a different sacredness than you know." Literature scholar Elizabeth Anderson argues that Le Guin's critique is directed more at religious fundamentalism than at monotheism. The Alds' beliefs are more complex than Memer believes: while they despise writing, they value poetry and spoken words, and are moved by Orrec's recitations. While Le Guin criticizes the violence of the Alds, she also depicts the failed violent uprising in a negative light. A diplomatic settlement is ultimately what ends the conflict, though Memer acknowledges her unsatisfied desire for revenge as Iddor and his followers are escorted out of Ansul to be tried for treason.

== Reception ==
Voices received critical acclaim upon its publication. In 2007 the book was a Locus Award finalist in the Best Young Adult Book category. Annals of the Western Shore as a whole has been described as part of a renaissance in Le Guin's work since the publishing of The Birthday of the World in 2002, in which the underlying plot of the novel was not subsumed by socially relevant themes. A review for the Center for Children's Books praised Le Guin's world building in particular, saying that the alternative universe of the story was "utterly credible", and that Le Guin had covered everything from minute detail to history and politics. The review also complimented the characters in the book and singled out Memer, saying that the detailed portrayal of her growth was "masterfully understated."

Kirkus Reviews described Voices as a story "fraught with political tension", and stated that though the analogies to contemporary politics were clear, Le Guin's world building was so thorough that the story did not "bludgeon readers with allegory", and allowed them to imagine alternatives to violence, and to appreciate the power of language. The San Francisco Chronicle also wrote that the themes of the book were timely, and that while the plot had "high stakes", Le Guin "[kept] her prose calm and free of melodrama." Le Guin's prose was likewise praised by a review in The Buffalo News, which said that "The power of the novel lies...in the language that leaps from the pages and into the brain pan, producing a lovely explosion there."

A review in the science fiction fan magazine Strange Horizons applauded Le Guin, saying that she "takes nearly every trope of the fantasy genre and deliberately sets them aside," such as by not painting the Alds as "two-dimensional villains." The review stated that as a result the story was "wonderfully told", and did better than conventional "clichéd" fantasy. The reviewer commented that though the message of the book was topical, "there's also a truth there that goes beyond a single time and place." The review referred to Memer as a "quiet and compelling" voice, while scholar Sandra Lindow also praised Memer's characterization, calling her a "thoughtful and assured" narrative voice. Multiple reviews compared the book to Fahrenheit 451 by Ray Bradbury, which also prominently features the destruction of books by an oppressive authority. The Sydney Morning Herald stated that Le Guin's work was "at once more concrete and more ethereal than the Bradbury", and was a demonstration of her "tremendous skill as a writer". It went on to call the book a "deeply felt meditation on family, country, beauty, culture and courage."

Anderson praised the book for "[encouraging] young adult readers to imaginatively approach their own encounters with religious difference." According to her, Voices is part of a trend within children's writing of drawing on a variety of religious traditions, and of emphasizing reconciliation, rather than defeat and victory. She compared the story to Guardian of the Dead by Karen Healey, Uprooted by Naomi Novik, and the Daughter of Smoke and Bone trilogy by Laini Taylor, and asserted that Voices separated children's literature from specifically Christian imagery, in contrast to Philip Pullman's His Dark Materials, which critiqued Christianity, or J. K. Rowling's Harry Potter, which included conservative Christian notions of heroic sacrifice.

== Sources ==
- Anderson, Elizabeth (June 2016). "Ursula Le Guin and Theological Alterity" (PDF). Literature & Theology. 30 (2): 182–197. doi:10.1093/litthe/frw018. hdl:1893/23045.
- Covarr, Fiona (2015). "Hybridity, Third Spaces and Identities in Ursula Le Guin's Voices". Mousaion. 33 (2): 128–139. doi:10.25159/0027-2639/179. hdl:2263/51613.
- Le Guin, Ursula K. (2008). Voices. Orlando, Florida: Harcourt Inc. ISBN 978-0-15-205678-0.
- Lindow, Sandra J. (2006). "Wild Gifts: Anger management and moral development in the fiction of Ursula K. Le Guin and Maurice Sendak". Extrapolation. 47 (3): 445–456. doi:10.3828/extr.2006.47.3.8.
- Oziewicz, Marek C. (2011). "Restorative Justice Scripts in Ursula K. Le Guin's Voices". Children's Literature in Education. 42: 33–43. doi:10.1007/s10583-010-9118-8. S2CID 145122571.
