= Powers (novel) =

2007 novel by Ursula K. Le Guin

- Author: Ursula K. Le Guin
- Language: English
- Series: Annals of the Western Shore
- Genre: Fantasy
- Publisher: Harcourt
- Publication date: September 1, 2007
- ISBN: 978-0-15-205770-1
- Preceded by: Voices

Powers (2007) is the third book in the trilogy Annals of the Western Shore a young adult series by Ursula K. Le Guin. It is preceded in the series by Gifts (2004) Voices (2006).

Powers begins in the city of Etra, a city-state resembling the Roman Republic in which wealthy families keep slaves. Gavir and his sister are slaves of the wealthy family of Arcamand. Possessed of an exceptional memory, Gavir is trained to be a teacher, and as a child is convinced of his owner's benevolence. After his sister is raped and killed, a grief-stricken Gavir leaves the city. Pursued by a slavecatcher, he travels through various societies as he attempts to find a home.

Powers won the 2008 Nebula Award for Best Novel. It was positively received by reviewers, who praised its exploration of power and freedom in society, and wrote that Le Guin had created a convincing setting. Multiple reviewers suggested that Powers conveyed a sense of hope to young readers finding their place in the world.

== Setting ==
Powers is the third volume of Annals of the Western Shore, following Gifts (2004) and Voices (2006). Gifts tells the story of Gry and Orrec, who grew up in Uplands in the far north of the fictional world depicted in the series, while Voices is set in the city of Ansul, in the southern region of the same world. The civilization of this world was settled by people from across a desert to the east of the regions depicted in the series. It consists of a number of city states, as well as some nomads on the borders of the desert. Powers begins in the city of Etra, whose political structure is similar to that of the Roman Republic. The wealthy families keep slaves, of whom the protagonist, Gavir, is one. Slaves are not allowed to keep their children, and slaves are thus considered not to have ancestors. Gavir and his sister Sallo are of the Rassiu, or marsh people, kidnapped as children by slave-takers. They are raised in the household of Arcamand alongside the children of the Arca family that owns them.

== Plot ==
Gavir has the gift of exceptional memory and occasional precognition. As a young child he "remembers" future events, but his elder sister Sallo cautions him to keep his power secret. All the household's children, free and enslaved, are educated by Everra, an elderly slave who trains Gavir to succeed him. Gavir is treated kindly by Yaven, the Family's eldest son, but as the children grow older he is often bullied by Yaven's brother Torm, and their half-brother Hoby, born to a slave woman. When Everra attempts to discipline Hoby, Torm challenges him, and in a fit of rage fatally wounds a younger boy. Torm is sent to train with soldiers, and the children pass several uneventful years.

Upon reaching adulthood Yaven joins the Etran military, and is given Sallo as a "gift-girl". The couple are content, having fallen in love. During Yaven's absence on a military excursion, Etra is attacked by neighboring Casicar, and endures a difficult siege. Gavir is lent to the city temple to assist with records. Here, other learned slaves introduce him to modern literature shunned by the conservative Everra, including writings by Orrec Caspro and others that challenge the slave-holding social order.

The Etran military eventually lifts the siege, but is rapidly dispatched elsewhere. In Yaven's absence, Torm and Hoby kidnap Sallo and another slave girl, taking them to a pleasure house outside the city where they are raped and killed. After her funeral outside the city, a grief-stricken Gavir is allowed to remain by the pyre, and he simply walks out of the city. After weeks of aimless wandering he is given shelter by an elderly hermit, Cuga, with whom he spends many months.

After a season with Cuga, Gavir joins a band of runaway slaves in the deep forest led by Barna, who subsist by raiding nearby villages. Gavir realizes that the men sometimes seize women as mistresses for Barna. Gavir's skill at retelling stories makes him popular, and he befriends Diero, an older woman and formerly Barna's mistress. Barna's men return from a raid with two sisters, Irad and Melle. Barna becomes smitten with the adolescent Irad, while Gavir befriends the young Melle, and teaches her letters. One night, Irad takes refuge from Barna in Gavir's room; fearing Barna's wrath, Diero persuades Gavir to flee.

Gavir flees to the nearby marsh people, who help him find his remaining family; his aunt Gegemer, and his uncle Metter, who takes him in. After some peaceful months Gavir's visions, long absent, return. He seeks his aunt's advice, knowing she has similar powers, but the marsh society's strict separation of women's and men's business stops her from teaching him. Gavir is taken to Dorod, a "seerman" who, attempting to train Gavir, gives him powerful mind-altering drugs that sicken him. Gegemer rescues him, nurses him back to health, and then tells Gavir she has had visions of him being pursued by an unknown man. Fearing Torm and Hoby, he flees once again.

Gavir returns to the forest to find Barna's band devastated by armies from the slave-holding cities. He finds Melle among the survivors and takes her with him. They buy passage on a barge, and as they depart see Hoby on the shore: it is indeed him giving chase. They disembark at a minor stop and proceed on foot. Hoby catches up to them as they cross a major river but is carried away by the current and presumably drowned. They come to the city of Mesun, where the poet Caspro lives. Gavir musters the courage to visit him, realizes he foresaw the visit. Caspro and his household invite Gavir and Melle to live with them.

== Themes ==
Powers explores freedom, power, and the structure of society, as well as themes it shares with the other books in the Annals of the Western Shore, like slavery, justice, and the place of women in society. The book's title refers to Gavir's ability but also the nature of power, a question which permeates the story. The slaveholding family that owns Gavir is apparently benevolent, and some slaves see them as such: but their facade collapses after Sallo's rape and death, spurring Gavir's escape. The society of the heart of the forest is not immune to abuses of power, despite its leaders being escaped slaves. Barna tells Gavir that despite the latter's learning, he lacks power over other people. Barna desires this power, and possesses it in his forest society, including coercive power over his mistresses, who are kidnapped and enslaved. Le Guin suggests that power over other humans always corrupts, as even the formerly enslaved are capable of brutalizing others.

The power of reading and storytelling are also featured prominently in the Annals, with each protagonist having a love of books and story. Like the other protagonists of the Annals, Gavir's magical powers do not greatly benefit him, and he must find a place where he is also intellectually free. Gavir's physical journey to liberation (which depicts of a slave escaping to freedom across a river, an image featured prominently in Uncle Tom's Cabin) is concurrent with his coming of age and the choices he makes as he learns to live a free life. He is unable to find solace among his own people, as their rigid society is too confining for him. Like Memer in Voices, he eventually finds his place with Orrec and Gry in the University town of Mesun, where he can use his gift for letters.

== Publication and reception ==
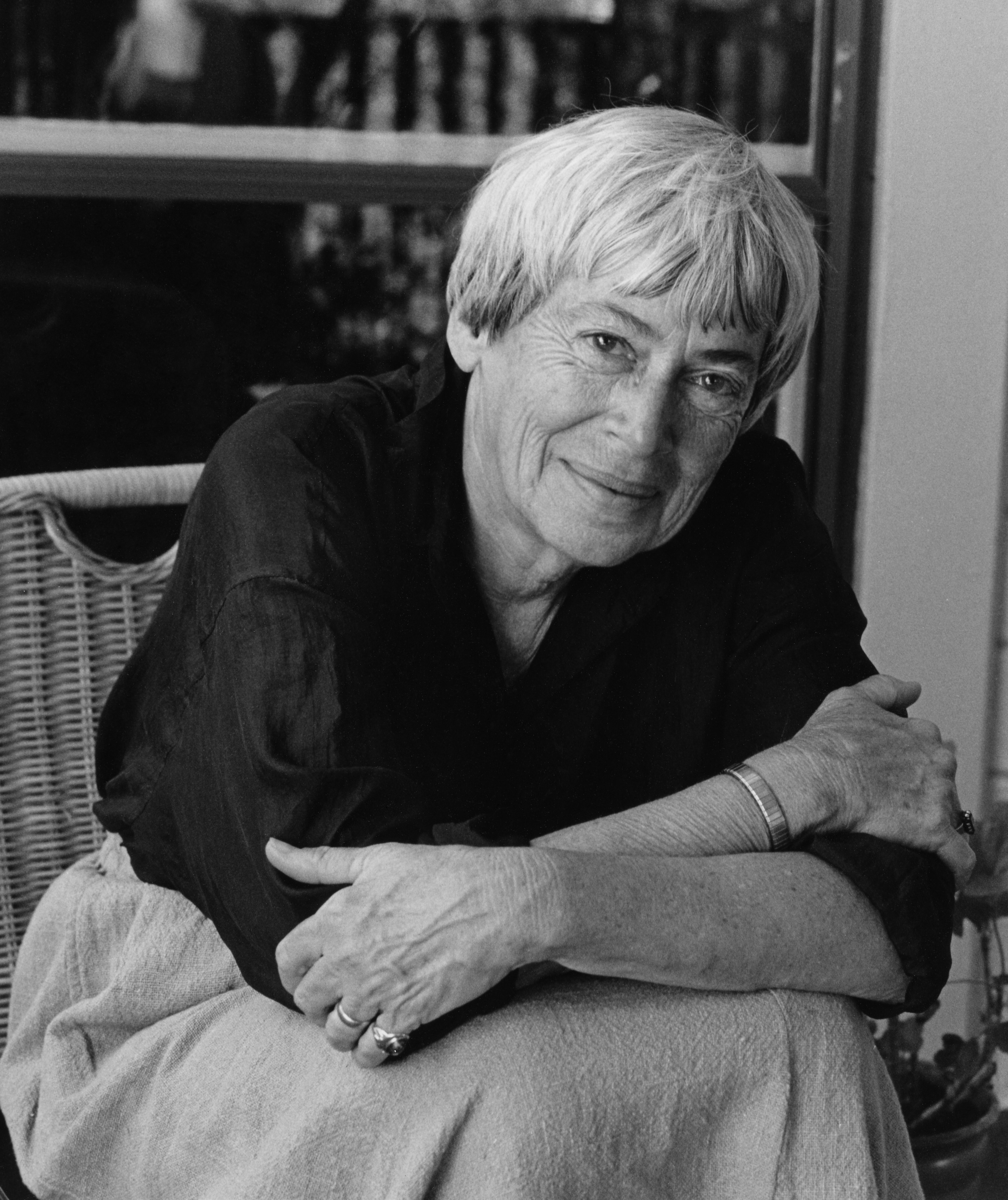
Author Ursula K. Le Guin in 1995

Powers was published by Harcourt and Gollancz in 2008. It won the Nebula Award for Best Novel, given by the Science Fiction and Fantasy Writers Association for science fiction or fantasy novels. It was a finalist for the Endeavour Award, and for the Locus Award for Best Young Adult Book. Booklist included Powers on its Editors' Choice list for 2007. According to speculative fiction author Jo Walton, Powers was an unusual choice for the Nebula Award, as a fantasy story written for young adults: the award more typically goes to a work of adult science fiction.

Writing for Tor, Walton praised Le Guin's characterization of the inhabitants of Arcamand. She also praised Le Guin's fantasy world as thoroughly realistic in its history and social structure. A review in the online magazine Strange Horizons echoed this assessment, saying "Le Guin is brilliant at creating whole societies", while Horn Book Magazine wrote that Le Guin's "rich complexity of hypothetical cultures" gave the reader "new insight" into our own world. According to Walton Powers was one of the best Nebula Award winners of its period, calling it a "subtle and complex book with a strong thread of story drawing you on through". Walton wrote that the Annals of the Western Shore represented a period of new assurance in Le Guin's writing. A review in the Toronto Star praised Le Guin's world building and writing of Gavir, saying that he was "familiar and admirable" for his "vulnerability and his slow recognition of his real gifts". A review in the Globe and Mail described Le Guin's writing as "like a ship in a bottle, intricate and elegant". The reviewer praised Le Guin's ability to deliver a morally complex narrative that was "rich with action", and said that a young reader would be left hopeful of finding their place in the world. The review also echoed the praise for Le Guin's characters, calling them "nuanced, gritty, [and] convincing". A review in Booklist highlighted Gavir's coming of age into a life that built on his love of story, while praising Le Guin's "shimmering lyricism".

== Sources ==
- Le Guin, Ursula K. (2009). Powers. Graphia. ISBN 9780152066741.
