= Jupiter Award (science fiction award) =

The Jupiters were annual awards presented to science fiction writing annually for the preceding year during 1974 - 1978. There were awards for the best novel, novella, novelette and short story. They were presented by the Instructors of Science Fiction in Higher Education.

== Winners ==
Year	Novel	Novella	Novelette	Short Story
1974	Rendezvous with Rama, by Arthur C. Clarke	The Feast of St. Dionysus, by Robert Silverberg	The Deathbird, by Harlan Ellison	A Supplicant in Space, by Robert Sheckley
1975	The Dispossessed, by Ursula K. Le Guin	Riding the Torch, by Norman Spinrad	The Seventeen Virgins, by Jack Vance	The Day Before the Revolution, by Ursula K. Le Guin
1977	Where Late the Sweet Birds Sang, by Kate Wilhelm	Houston, Houston, Do You Read?, by James Tiptree, Jr.	The Diary of the Rose, by Ursula K. Le Guin	I See You, by Damon Knight
1978	A Heritage of Stars, by Clifford D. Simak	In the Hall of the Martian Kings, by John Varley	Time Storm, by Gordon R. Dickson	Jeffty Is Five, by Harlan Ellison
