= Orsinian Tales =

1976 short story collection by Ursula Le Guin

- Cover of first edition
- Author: Ursula K. Le Guin
- Language: English
- Publisher: Harper & Row United States
- Publication date: 1976
- Publication place: United States
- Media type: Print (hardcover)
- Pages: 179 pp
- ISBN: 0-06-012561-6
- OCLC: 2331143

Orsinian Tales is a collection of eleven short stories by American writer Ursula K. Le Guin, most of them set in the imaginary Eastern European country of Orsinia.

== Themes ==
The stories in the collection share few links, except those derived from the use of a common geographical setting. The only link between characters appears in the stories Brothers and Sisters and A Week in the Country, both of which deal with members of the Fabbre family (whose history is continued in the later story Unlocking the Air). Common to all the stories, however, are emotionally moving personal events—often romantic—set against the backdrop of much larger political events such as wars and revolutions. Continually reasserted are the rights of the individual—sometimes alone, but often in conjunction with others—to his or her own thoughts and emotions, not dictated by society, convention, or the State.

== Continuations ==
Additional stories in the cycle include the following:

- the novel Malafrena (1979), set in the Orsinia of the 1820s
- the Borges-like story "Two Delays on the Northern Line", containing two tangentially linked episodes of uncertain date
- "Unlocking the Air" (Note: The short story "The Diary of the Rose" is of uncertain category: Despite characters sharing several names from the Orsinian style (including one, Sorde, which also appears in Malafrena) the story abandons the realism of the others, in favor of a science fiction premise (explored for its personal and political implications) and never explicitly states the place or time where it takes place (at one point "the twentieth century" is spoken of in past tense). Le Guin has written, "I don't think 'The Diary of the Rose' takes place in Orsinia, it seems more like South America to me, but the protagonist has an Orsinian name.")

The last-named story extends Orsinian history up to the downfall of Communism in Orsinia—and the rest of Eastern Europe—in the winter of 1989. (Note: A central theme in the story is demonstrators shaking keys to "unlock the air", was seen in the demonstrations of 1989. "Today, at exactly noon in Prague, people flooded into the streets around Wenceslas Square, the central shopping thoroughfare, rattling key chains and tinkling tiny bells. The jingling of keys, acts symbolizing the opening of hitherto locked doors, has become a common gesture in the wave of demonstrations ... . On Jungmanova Square, Mr. Havel himself stood beaming broadly on the balcony of a building ... . He lustily jingled a bunch of keys.")

== Orsinia ==
The stories are set in a fictional country somewhere in Central Europe, at different times during the period 1150–1989 (though only two stories take place before the 20th century). This country, "Orsinia," appears in Le Guin's earliest writings, and it was invented by Le Guin when she was a young adult learning the craft of a writer. The names Orsinia and Ursula are both derived from the Latin word 'ursus,' 'bear' (ursula is the diminutive of 'ursa,' 'female bear'; ursinus means 'bear-like'). Le Guin once said that since Orsinia was her country, it should bear her name.

The history of Orsinia generally follows that of other countries of Central Europe, particularly those that were formerly part of Austria-Hungary. Formerly an independent kingdom (in "The Lady of Moge"), by the 19th century it was a dependency of the Austrian Empire (in Malafrena). Orsinia was involved in the First World War (in "Conversations at Night"), and after that war it was independent for a time. Its fate during World War II is not mentioned, but in 1946 or 1947, it became a satellite state in the Eastern bloc. A revolt was attempted in 1956 (in "The Road East"), but it was crushed and followed by reprisals (in "A Week in the Country"); Orsinia remained a repressive police state for several decades. In November 1989, following a series of non-violent protests, the government fell, to be replaced by a transitional regime promising free elections (in "Unlocking the Air"). Le Guin did not publish any Orsinian stories dealing with its history since that event. (Note: "As for Orsinia, I have not been able to go back there since 1990, though I have tried several times. The borders are closed. I don't know what's going on. It worries me.")

The Orsinian stories borrow episodes from (and sometimes explicitly refer to) the history of the Czech lands, in addition to Hungary and other countries of Central Europe (Note: "And of course if there's any country Orsinia is like, it's Czechoslovakia. It's puzzled me that everyone says Orsinia is like Hungary, but nobody mentions Czechoslovakia." "I have used the history of Poland, though not in science-fiction stories, in 'main stream' [sic] stories ... . I have written an historical novel, Malafrena, and a collection of stories, Orsinian Tales, all set in an imaginary central European country in the historical past. Malafrena concerns the Revolution of 1830, and you will find certain parallels to Polish history in it.") (Note: Similarities to Czechoslovakia include that Orsinia is landlocked, and in the 19th century rebelled unsuccessfully against Habsburg rule.) However, the collection is not a mere fictionalization of any real country but rather one imagined with its own unique characteristics and history, distilled from Le Guin's personal interpretation of and reaction to historical events. (Note: "Another thing important to Orsinia's development was that I became aware politically. The first thing I really noticed and took personally, from a political standpoint, was the invasion of Czechoslovakia in 1947 [sic] by the Russians. That's when I came of age and realized I had a stake in this world ... . Writing about Orsinia allowed me to talk about a situation that had touched my heart, yet I could distance it, which was very important at that time.")

== Contents ==
- "The Fountains"
- "The Barrow" (1976, The Magazine of Fantasy & Science Fiction, October 1976)
- "Ile Forest"
- "Conversations At Night"
- "The Road East"
- "Brothers and Sisters" (1976, The Little Magazine, Vol. 10, Nos. 1 & 2)
- "A Week in the Country" (1976, The Little Magazine, Vol. 9, No. 4)
- "An die Musik" (1961, The Western Humanities Review, Vol XV, No. 3)
- "The House"
- "The Lady of Moge"
- "Imaginary Countries" (1973, The Harvard Advocate)

== Bibliography ==
- Cadden, Mike (2005). Ursula K. le Guin Beyond Genre: Fiction for children and adults (1st ed.). New York, NY: Routledge. ISBN 0-415-99527-2.
