= Changing Planes =

2003 collection of short stories by Ursula K. Le Guin

- Cover of the first edition
- Author: Ursula K. Le Guin
- Illustrator: Eric Beddows
- Language: English
- Genre: Science fiction
- Publisher: Harcourt Inc.
- Publication date: 2003
- Publication place: United States
- Media type: Print (hardback & paperback)
- Pages: 246 pp
- ISBN: 0-15-100971-6
- OCLC: 50643645

Changing Planes is a 2003 collection of short stories by Ursula K. Le Guin. Each chapter describes a different world and the society that inhabits it; these societies share similarities to Earth's cultures in some respects, but they may be notably dissimilar in other respects. Many of the chapters are brief vignettes or ethnographic profiles of the societies they describe.

Changing Planes won the Locus Award for Best Collection in 2004.

== Concept and analysis ==
The conceit of the collection, described in the first story, "Sita Dulip's Method", is based on a pun that ties the book together: that the low-level discomfort of forced confinement in an airport while changing planes can, in fact, cause one to change from one "plane" of reality to another. Because of the different flow of time in other planes, one can spend a week visiting another plane and return in time to make a connecting flight on this plane.

One scholar notes that the stories explore an underlying, unifying theme around the "inherent difficulties in translations and understanding other cultures."

The literary style of the collection has been compared to that of Jonathan Swift and Jorge Luis Borges.

== Contents ==
- "Sita Dulip's Method"

Introduction to the premise of the volume.

- "Porridge on Islac"

About a society which has taken genetic engineering to extremes. This story features a woman whose genome is partly maize.

- "The Silence of the Asonu"

About a people who do not speak as adults and the visitors from Earth who seek meaning in their silence and their rare utterances.

- "Feeling at Home with the Hennebet"

About a people whose society is based on a concept of "living multiple lives", which is never completely explained.

- "The Ire of the Veksi"

About a culture of people who are angry most of the time, and its ramifications, such as sulking and war.

- "Seasons of the Ansarac"

About a planet with very long years (about 24 Earth years), within each of which its people migrate to and from the mountains in the north; based on the migration patterns of ospreys.

- "Social Dreaming of the Frin"

About a society where dreams are shared telepathically and the unconscious is the collective unconscious.

- "The Royals of Hegn"

About a country where almost everyone is royalty, and the one family of commoners is treated as celebrities.

- "Woeful Tales from Mahigul"

Includes four tales: "Dawodow the Innumerable", about a narcissistic and tyrannical emperor who both loved and hated himself; "The Cleansing of Obtry", about a region marked by religious conflict; "The Black Dog", that tells the story of a mysterious black dog that drove two tribes into mayhem; and "The War for the Alon", about two city-states that destroyed themselves over a small piece of land each claimed by divine right.

- "Great Joy"

About a plane that has been turned into a collection of holiday-themed resorts by an Earth-based corporation.

- "Wake Island"

About a population of people genetically engineered not to need sleep, who never fully achieve consciousness.

- "The Nna Mmoy Language"

About the complexities of language in a world where every living thing unnecessary to human life has been removed. These people have replaced biodiversity with language.

- "The Building"

About a global society which is organized around the endless construction of a building. These nomads invest tremendous resources creating an uninhabited, labyrinthine castle.

- "The Fliers of Gy"

About a plane of feathered people, a few of whom develop wings and yet such happening is considered a misfortune, and the wings a disability.

- "The Island of the Immortals"

About a visit to an island that is said to be inhabited by immortals.

- "Confusions of Uñi"

About a plane where reality seems to shift unpredictably.
