= Sur (short story) =

Short story by Ursula K. Le Guin

- Short story by Ursula K. Le Guin
- Country: USA
- Genre: Science fiction

Publication
- Published in: The New Yorker
- Publication type: Periodical
- Media type: Print
- Publication date: February 1, 1982

"Sur" is a short story by the American writer Ursula K. Le Guin, first published in The New Yorker on February 1, 1982. It was included in The Compass Rose, a collection of stories by Le Guin first published in July 1982.

The subtitle is "A Summary Report of the Yelcho Expedition to the Antarctic, 1909–1910"; the story describes an expedition to the South Pole by a group of women from South America.

The title "Sur" (Spanish "South") may be compared with South, the title of Ernest Shackleton's account of the Antarctic expedition of 1914–1917.

== Story summary ==
The narrator, a woman in Lima, Peru, does not write for publication; this account of her adventure will be kept in a trunk in the attic, to be found by future generations.

Upon reading about the voyage of the Belgica, she was inspired by the undertaking of expeditions to Antarctica, particularly The Voyage of the Discovery, Captain Scott's book about his expedition of 1902–1904. She plans, with several friends, a similar expedition. They find a benefactor, and the nine women, from Peru, Chile, and Argentina, meet in Punta Arenas in Chile in August 1909.

They have hired the Yelcho, a steamer commanded by Captain Pardo. They sail to the Ross Sea, and at Hut Point they visit Captain Scott's hut; not liking the state it is in, they eventually decide to set up camp on the Great Ice Barrier, digging out cubicles in the ice. Grouped into two sledge teams and a support team, they journey south, covering about 15 miles (24 km) a day on level ice, and ascending the Florence Nightingale Glacier, as they have named it – shown on maps as the Beardmore Glacier. They reach the South Pole on 22 December 1909.

On returning to base camp, they realize that one of the group, Teresa, is pregnant. A baby girl is delivered, and Teresa names her Rosa – Rosa del Sur (Rose of the South). The Yelcho returns to their camp as promised, and the group returns home.

After the narrator learns of the Yelcho's role in rescuing Shackleton's men from Elephant Island, she writes to congratulate Captain Pardo, and thank him again. "Never one word has he breathed of our secret. He is a man of honor, Luis Pardo."

== Reception ==
"Sur" won the Locus Award for Best Short Story in 1983, and it was nominated for the Hugo Award for Best Short Story in that year. It was also included in The Best American Short Stories 1983 alongside “The Professor‘s Houses,” also by Le Guin.

Francine Prose wrote that it was "my favorite story by Ursula K. Le Guin.... "Sur"... typifies what she does best: construct a lightly ironic, playful and more or less fantastic fiction of ideas, with an interest in ... the different methods by which men and women apprehend and respond to the world".

Anne K. Kaler argues that the story provides a cleverly coded map for women striving to be professional writers; to illustrate the paths that women writers must take into the tundras ruled by male writers, she uses the devices of disorder, dislocation, and reversal in the journey/journal.
