= Catwings =

Children's book series by Ursula K. Le Guin

Front cover of the first book (1988)

Catwings is a series of four American children's picture books written by Ursula K. Le Guin, illustrated by S. D. Schindler, and originally published by Scholastic from 1988 to 1999. It follows the adventures of kittens who were born with wings. Catwings is also the title of the first book in the series. The series is in print from Scholastic as of August 2015.

In Britain the series was published in two omnibus volumes as Tales of Catwings and More Tales of the Catwings (Puffin/Penguin, 1999 and 2000). In America the 2003 editions were available in a boxed set of four with slipcase title The Catwings Collection (Orchard/Scholastic), listed as Catwings Set by Powell's Books.

Scholastic classifies the Catwings books as fantasy and classifies the first two by "interest level" as "grades 2–5", the last two as "grades preK–3" (children of ages about 7–11 and 4–9 respectively). The series is covered by the Internet Speculative Fiction Database, which classifies the volumes as short fiction and as chapbooks.

Scholastic Book Guides, a series for schoolteachers, includes one Catwings volume.

In 2002 and 2003 as Catwings 5 and Catwings 6, Le Guin published online editions of picture books "by Mrs. Katz's First Grade Class".

Ten years after their last Catwings volume, Le Guin and Schindler created another picture book featuring a cat: Cat Dreams (Orchard/Scholastic, 2009), with "easy rhyming text" and "realistic, full-bleed watercolor illustrations".

== Plot summary ==
=== Catwings ===
Mrs. Jane Tabby can't explain why her four kittens were born with wings, but she is grateful that they are able to use their flying skills to soar away from the dangerous city slums where they were born. However, once the kittens escape the big city, they learn that country life can be just as difficult.

Cover of the second book (1989).

=== Catwings Return ===
James and Harriet return to the city to find their mother. When they arrive, they find a small black kitten with wings, isolated and traumatized. They gain its trust, find their mother, and learn that the kitten is hers – lost when their first home, an old dumpster, was moved. Mother Jane declines to leave the city but asks James and Harriet to take the kitten with them. They do, and the rural children who have cared for them name her Jane.

=== Wonderful Alexander and the Catwings ===
In the country, a self-important young cat named Alexander leaves home and finds the catwings family. He grows up as he helps Jane talk.

=== Jane on Her Own ===
Young Jane leaves her farm family and returns to the city. She and mother Jane find a home with a woman in an apartment.

== Publication ==
All books were written by Ursula K. Le Guin and illustrated by S. D. Schindler; cover designs vary but consistently use illustrations by Schindler. U.S. editions were published by Scholastic, perhaps under its Orchard Books imprint.

- Catwings (Orchard Books, 1988), LCCN 87-33104
- Catwings Return (1989)
- Wonderful Alexander and the Catwings (1994)
- Jane on Her Own (1999)
- Tales of Catwings (UK: Puffin Books/Penguin, 1999), ISBN 0-14-130040-X – omnibus edition of books 1–2
- More Tales of the Catwings (Puffin, 2000), ISBN 0-14-130531-2 – omnibus of books 3–4

All four books were reissued by Orchard/Scholastic in May 2003 with cover designs that display their titles under a common banner that shows "A Catwings Tale", uppercase. They are sometimes listed with titles such as Catwings Return (A Catwings Tale) and Jane on Her Own: A Catwings Tale.

- The Catwings Collection (2003), ISBN 0439551056 – boxed set of "Le Guin's first four installments of her series" (as by Ken Geist and Le Guin)

== Reception ==
Kirkus Reviews called the first Catwings book "a charming, if insubstantial story" and concluded, "Although there is nothing extraordinary here in either theme or event, the wit and precision with which the story is told give it considerable appeal. Schindler's exquisitely detailed drawings, warmed with the softest of added color, make a perfect accompaniment to what should serve as a satisfying young reader or as a read-aloud". Reviewing the sequel six months later, Kirkus observed: "Like its predecessor, this is a rather mild little story made interesting by its beguiling subject, the author's wit and felicitous use of language, and the illustrator's fine, splendidly detailed drawings".

== Illustrator ==
Steven D. Schindler was born September 27, 1952, in Kenosha, Wisconsin, and raised there. He graduated from the University of Pennsylvania with a major in biology. He lives in Philadelphia (1999 and 2015).

By 1989 his books had been published with credit as illustrator under all of the forename(s) S. D., Steven, Steven D., and Steve.

A list of works published in January 2007 covered more than 100 books but only one as both writer and illustrator ("self-illustrated"), namely My First Bird Book (Random House, 1989, LCCN 89-213727). In February 2013 the Kirkus Reviews review of his forthcoming self-illustrated picture book Spike and Ike Take a Hike (New York: Nancy Paulsen Books, April 2013, LCCN 2012-10367) observed that "Schindler has illustrated well over 100 picture and chapter books but almost never written the text himself. Readers will be happy he has taken this path". As of August 2015 the Library of Congress Online Catalog includes 130 records of books that it credits to him, which may include multiple editions of some titles. Its records for those two books alone credit Schindler as writer and illustrator.

The First Tulips in Holland, written by Phyllis Krasilovsky and published by Doubleday in 1982, was Schindler's first book published, he says. (Note: LC catalog records credit him with illustrating one earlier book, The Ghost in the Church by G. C. Skipper (Chicago: Children's Press, 1976, LCCN 75-35921), under the name Steven Schindler. That is also the one pre-1982 book listed for him in Something About the Author (Gale, 2007).) For that work he received a 1982 Parents' Choice Award for Illustration. If You Should Hear a Honey Guide, April Pulley Sayre (Houghton Mifflin, 1995) was recognized by a 1995 Smithsonian Award for outstanding natural history and Don't Fidget a Feather!, Erica Silverman (Simon & Schuster Children's, 1994) with a 1996–97 California Young Reader Medal.

WorldCat reports that Catwings (1988) ranks fourth among Schindler's books most widely held in participating libraries. The others in his top five, led by The Story of Salt, are much younger books. In chronological order:

- Boy, Were We Wrong About Dinosaurs!, written by Kathleen V. Kudlinski (Dutton Children's Books, 2005), unpaged, OCLC 52547649
- Whittington, Alan Armstrong (Random House, 2005), 191 pp. – featuring "a feline descendant of Dick Whittington's famous cat of English folklore", OCLC 55131439
- The Story of Salt, Mark Kurlansky (G. P. Putnam's Sons, 2006), 48 pp., OCLC 62302331
- Tricking the Tallyman, Jacqueline D. Davies (Alfred A. Knopf, 2009), unpaged – set in Vermont during the inaugural 1790 U.S. census, OCLC 190760583
