= Ansible (disambiguation) =

An ansible is a category of fictional devices or technology capable of near-instantaneous or faster-than-light communication.

Ansible may also refer to:

- Ansible (software), open-source software provisioning, configuration management, and application-deployment tool
- Ansible (magazine), a newsletter by David Langford
