= Planet of Exile =

1966 science fiction novel by Ursula K. Le Guin

- Cover of first edition (softcover)
- Author: Ursula K. Le Guin
- Cover artist: Jerome Podwil
- Language: English
- Series: Hainish Cycle
- Genre: Science fiction
- Publisher: Ace Books
- Publication date: 1966
- Publication place: United States
- Media type: Print (hardback & paperback)
- Pages: 113
- OCLC: 3224206
- Preceded by: Rocannon's World (1966)
- Followed by: City of Illusions (1967)

Planet of Exile is a 1966 science fiction novel by American writer Ursula K. Le Guin, part of her Hainish Cycle. It was first published as an Ace Double novel using the tête-bêche format, paired with Mankind Under the Leash by Thomas M. Disch.

== Plot summary ==
The story is set on Werel, the third planet of the Gamma Draconis star system. The planet has an orbital period of 60 Earth years and is approaching its correspondingly long winter. The main characters belong to one of two major groups. Wold and his daughter Rolery are members of the Tevarans, a tribe of humanoids indigenous to the planet. Jakob Agat is a young man from a dwindling colony of Earth humans who have been effectively marooned on the planet. The people do not accept the other group as humans, and they refer to it in several conversations during the book. The genetic difference is significant enough to prevent interbreeding.

The relationship between the two groups has long been tense and characterized by limited interaction. However, with the approaching dangers of winter and the group of the Gaal, the groups must cooperate to save their people. The visit of curious young Rolery to the colony of Earth humans becomes a sign that the situation is changing.

== Main characters ==
Alla Pasfal
A member in the Council of the colonist city of Landin. She is a frail elder but wise and sharp-witted.
The Gaal
Nomadic native tribes who migrate south during the harsh Winter. They share a common language with the Tevarans.
Jakob Agat Alterra
The de facto leader of the Council in Landin. He is a middle-aged, wise man, who, like all colonists, has bluish-black skin.
Rolery
The protagonist of the story and a native of the planet. She has a precocious and independent spirit, and remains single, largely as a consequence of being born out of season. Like the natives of Tevar, she is light-skinned with golden eyes. She has the rare ability of mindspeech.
Seiko Esmit
The last member of a great family line who lives in Landin. She is a middle-aged, delicate and nervous woman.
Ukwet
One of Wold's grandsons who happens to be older than Umaksuman. He ambushes Jakob Agat but is later killed in a duel with Umaksuman.
Umaksuman
One of Wold's spring-born sons who enjoys war and battle.
Wattock
An Alterran bone-setter who works alongside Rolery to tend to those injured in battle.
Wold
Rolery's father. He is a wise, willful, and misogynistic tribal elder in the city of Tevar.

== Native fauna ==
Hann
Sheep-like animals that are domesticated to provide food and clothing for the Tevarans and the citizens of Landin.
Snowghoul
Tall, thin, white-furred creatures with long necks that sway from side-to-side. They possess short but powerful clawed forearms and large snapping mouths lined with sharp teeth. They are quick, deadly, and hunt in packs.
Stormbringer
Taloned, pure white birds with silver eyes and a wingspan larger than a man's height. Their appearance in a southward migration signals the coming of Winter.

== Role in the Hainish Cycle ==
The peoples of the various worlds in Le Guin's space fiction are descendants of ancient settlements from Hain. For example, the Gethenians of The Left Hand of Darkness are believed to have been genetically engineered, as are several other peoples in the League of All Worlds. No such mention of genetic engineering of the Alterrans’ Hainish-derived predecessors is made in the story.

In City of Illusions descendants of the mixed Terrans and Tevarians described in this story return to Earth (Terra) and presumably, though it’s not depicted in the novel, later liberate it from alien conquerors who have the unexpected ability to mind-lie – which they used to telepathically conquer planets in the League of All Worlds, so this story is the backstory to City of Illusions. The reunification of the League as the Ekumen is mentioned in The Left Hand of Darkness, but Le Guin did not mention the details of the reunification.

A different planet, also called "Werel" in Four Ways to Forgiveness, is a completely different world from the planet of the Alterrans described in this story. The common word for "world" in the languages of both planets is werel, hence their common names just mean "The World".

== Literary significance and criticism ==
One science fiction scholar points out that Planet of Exile, along with Rocannon's World and City of Illusions exhibits Le Guin's struggle as an emerging writer to arrive at a plausible, uniquely memorable and straightforward locale for her stories.

== Publication history ==
Planet of Exile was initially published with no introduction, but Le Guin wrote an introduction for Harper & Row's 1978 hardcover edition. Planet of Exile was also reissued in 1978 along with Rocannon's World and City of Illusions in a volume called Three Hainish Novels and in 1996 with the same novels in a volume called Worlds of Exile and Illusion.

== Cancelled film adaptation ==
In 2017, the rights for a movie were acquired by Los Angeles Media Fund. However as of 2024, nothing came of it.

== Translations ==
- Russian: "Планета изгнания" ("Planet of Exile"), 1980, 1992, 1993, 1997, 1999, 2006
- Serbian: Planeta izgnanstva, published by Narodna knjiga/Partizanska knjiga Beograd, 1987
- Italian: Il Pianeta dell'esilio
- German: Das zehnte Jahr ("The Tenth Year"), German by Birgit Reß-Bohusch, no obvious translation problems in my source: Hainish, Heyne 06/7035, ISBN 3-453-21347-5 [Überarbeitete Neuausgabe 2002, incl. Rocannon, Exile, Illusions]
- Finnish: Maanpakolaisten planeetta, translated by Jyrki Iivonen, published by Avain, 2011.
- Estonian: Rocannoni maailm/Pagenduse planeet, translated by Kaaren Kaer, Krista Kaer, published by Varrak, 2002, ISBN 9985305248.
- Dutch: Ballingsplaneet, translated by T. Vos-Dahmen von Buchholz, published by Het Spectrum, 1973.
- Slovak: Planéta exilu, translated by Marta Kastlová, published by Smena in 1988.
- Spanish: Planeta de Exilio, translated by Enrique de Obregón, published by Orbis S.A. in 1988. ISBN 84-402-0687-9

== Sources ==
- Bernardo, Susan M.; Murphy, Graham J. (2006). Ursula K. Le Guin: A Critical Companion (1st ed.). Westport: Greenwood Press. ISBN 978-0-313-33225-8.
- Bloom, Harold, ed. (1986). Ursula K. Le Guin (1st ed.). New York: Chelsea House. ISBN 0-87754-659-2.
- Cadden, Mike (2005). Ursula K. Le Guin Beyond Genre: Fiction for Children and Adults (1st ed.). New York City: Routledge. ISBN 0-415-99527-2.
- Le Guin, Ursula K. (May 1992). The Language of the Night (revised ed.). HarperCollins. ISBN 978-0-06-016835-3.
- Le Guin, Ursula K. (1978). Three Hainish Novels (1st ed.). New York: Nelson Doubleday.
- Le Guin, Ursula K. (1996). Worlds of Exile and Illusion (1st ed.). New York: Orb. ISBN 978-0-312-86211-4.
- Morse, Donald E.; Matolcsy, Kalman (2011). The Mythic Fantasy of Robert Holdstock: Critical Essays on the Fiction (1st ed.). London: McFarland & Company, Inc. ISBN 978-0-7864-4942-2.
- Spivack, Charlotte (1984). Ursula K. Le Guin (1st ed.). Boston: Twayne Publishers. ISBN 0-8057-7393-2.
