= Ansible =

Fictional machine capable of faster-than-light communication

The term ansible refers to a category of fictional devices capable of faster-than-light communication. Ansible devices can instantaneously transmit and receive data across vast distances, including between star systems and even galaxies. The term was coined by Ursula K. Le Guin in her 1966 novel Rocannon’s World, and appears in many of her subsequent works. The term has also been used in the works of numerous other science-fiction authors. It is closely related to the terms ultraphone and ultrawave.

== Coinage by Ursula Le Guin ==
Ursula K. Le Guin first used the word ansible in her 1966 novel Rocannon's World. Etymologically, the origin of the word is uncertain.

In Le Guin's writings, the ansible is the basis for creating a specific kind of interstellar civilization, where communication between far-flung stars is instantaneous, but humans can only travel at relativistic speeds. Under these conditions, a full-fledged galactic empire is not possible, but there is a looser interstellar organization, in which several of Le Guin's protagonists are involved.

Although Le Guin invented the name ansible for this type of device (further developing its details in her fictional works), the broader concept of instantaneous superluminal or FTL communication had already existed in science fiction. Similar communication functions were included in a device called an "interocitor" in the 1952 novel This Island Earth by Raymond F. Jones, and the 1955 film based on the novel. Similarly in 1954, another of these devices called the "Dirac Communicator" appeared in James Blish's short story "Beep", which was expanded into the 1974 novel The Quincunx of Time. Additionally, Robert A. Heinlein, in his 1958 novel Time for the Stars, employed instantaneous telepathic communication between identical twin pairs over interstellar distances, and like Le Guin, provided a technical explanation based on a non-Einsteinian principle of simultaneity.

== In Le Guin's works ==
In her subsequent works, Le Guin continued to develop the concept of the ansible:

- In The Left Hand of Darkness (1969), Le Guin writes that the ansible "doesn't involve radio waves, or any form of energy. The principle it works on, the constant of simultaneity, is analogous in some ways to gravity ... One point has to be fixed, on a planet of certain mass, but the other end is portable."
- In The Word for World Is Forest (1972), Le Guin explains that in order for communication to work with any pair of ansibles, at least one "must be on a large-mass body, the other can be anywhere in the cosmos".
- In The Dispossessed (1974), Le Guin tells of the development of the theory leading up to the ansible.

Any ansible may be used to communicate through any other, by setting its coordinates to those of the receiving ansible. They have a limited bandwidth, allowing at most a few hundred characters of text to be communicated in any transaction of a dialog session, and are attached to a keyboard and small display to perform text messaging.

== Use by later authors ==
Since Le Guin's conception of the ansible, the name of the device has been borrowed by numerous authors. While Le Guin's ansible was said to communicate "instantaneously", the name has also been adopted for devices capable of communication at finite speeds that are faster than light.

=== Orson Scott Card's works ===
American author Orson Scott Card in his Ender's Game novels used the term "ansible" as an unofficial name for the "Philotic Parallax Instantaneous Communicator" device, which transmits information across infinite distances with no time delay. In the first Ender's Game novel (published in 1985), Colonel Graff states that "somebody dredged the name ansible out of an old book somewhere". In an answer on the question-and-answer website Quora, Card explained why he chose to appropriate LeGuin's term "ansible" instead of developing a new in-universe name for one:

In an FTL universe, you have several levels. [If you] can travel hyperfast, but no radio signal can outstrip [outrun] your ship, [then] you have to carry the mail with you. It's like the way things were between Europe and America before the laying of the successful transatlantic cable. But once it was laid, messages could be sent long before a ship could make the passage. That is like the ansible universe in Ursula K. LeGuin's early Hainish novels. Since I needed to use exactly that rule set, why not use the word – an excellent word – which I apply in the same way we all say 'robot,' an invented word that has entered the language, [and thereby] pay tribute to the writer from whose works I learned the word.

Card's ansible in the Ender's Game universe works via fictional subatomic particles called philotes. The two quarks inside a pi meson can be separated by an arbitrary distance, while remaining connected by "philotic rays". Card's version of the ansible also features in the video game Advent Rising, which he helped write the story for.

=== Usage by other authors ===
==== Usage of "ansible" or derived terms ====
Numerous other writers have included ansibles. Notable examples include:

- Vernor Vinge, in the 1988 short story "The Blabber."
- Joe M. McDermott, in the 2017 novel The Fortress at the End of Time.
- Thomas Happ, in the 2021 Metroidvania Axiom Verge 2, uses the term for superluminal - and transdimensional - communication terminals.
- David Wellington, in the 2024 novel Revenant-X.
- Elizabeth Moon, in the 1995 novel Winning Colors. and the novel Vatta's War
- Jason Jones, in the 1995 computer game Marathon 2: Durandal.
- L. A. Graf, in the 1996 Star Trek: Deep Space Nine novel Time's Enemy.
- Neal Asher, in his Polity series of novels including Gridlinked (2001), in which the runcible, named in homage to the ansible, is an interstellar wormhole generator/teleporter.
- Dan Simmons, in the 2003 novel Ilium.
- Becky Chambers, in her Wayfarer novels, including the 2014 novel The Long Way to a Small, Angry Planet, and 2016 novel A Closed and Common Orbit.
- Ross McCullough, in his novel The Body of this Death: Letters from the Last Archbishop of Lancaster in 2026.

==== Other depictions of FTL communication ====
Many authors have depicted FTL communication devices in their fictional works without necessarily using the term "ansible".

- Christopher Rowley, in his 1986 novel Starhammer, describes the Deep Link, an instantaneous interstellar communicator. Most commonly used for messaging, it is capable of voice and video conversations as well, although the latter only at great expense.
- The New Jedi Order, 1999, featured enemies, the Yuuzhan Vong, use organic communication devices known as villips, which can transmit over infinite distances thanks to telepathic connections formed while being harvested in groups.
- Philip Pullman, in the 2000 novel The Amber Spyglass, part of the His Dark Materials trilogy
- Liu Cixin, in the 2008 trilogy Remembrance of Earth's Past
- Kim Stanley Robinson, in the 2012 novel 2312
- L. J. Cohen in the 2014 novel Derelict
- Neon Yang, in the 2017 novella Waiting on a Bright Moon

== See also ==
- Interstellar communication
- No-cloning theorem
- Quantum entanglement
- Superluminal communication
- Tachyon
- Tachyonic antitelephone
