= The Left Hand of Darkness =

1969 science fiction novel by Ursula K. Le Guin

- Front cover of the first edition, with art by the Dillons
- Author: Ursula K. Le Guin
- Cover artist: Leo and Diane Dillon (depicted)
- Language: English
- Series: Hainish Cycle
- Genre: Science fiction
- Published: 1969 (Ace Books)
- Publication place: United States
- Media type: Print (paperback original; hardcover also 1969)
- Pages: 286 (first edition)
- OCLC: 181524
- Preceded by: City of Illusions
- Followed by: The Word for World Is Forest (Note: This sequence refers to novels in the Hainish cycle. The short story "Winter's King" was published in 1969, between the publication of City of Illusions (1967) and Left Hand.)

The Left Hand of Darkness is a science fiction novel by the American writer Ursula K. Le Guin. Published in 1969, its popularity established Le Guin's status as a major author of science fiction. The novel is set in the fictional universe of the Hainish Cycle, a series of novels and short stories by Le Guin, which she introduced in the 1964 short story "The Dowry of Angyar". It was fourth in writing sequence among the Hainish novels, preceded by City of Illusions and followed by The Word for World Is Forest.

The novel follows the story of Genly Ai, a human native of Terra, who is sent to the planet of Gethen as an envoy of the Ekumen, a loose confederation of planets. Ai's mission is to persuade the nations of Gethen to join the Ekumen, but he is stymied by a limited understanding of their culture. Individuals on Gethen are ambisexual, with no fixed sex; this situation has a strong influence on the planet's culture, and it creates a barrier of understanding for Ai.

The Left Hand of Darkness was among the first books in the genre now known as feminist science fiction, and it is described as the most famous examination of androgyny in science fiction. A major theme of the novel is the effect of sex and gender on culture and society, explored particularly through the relationship between Ai and Estraven, a Gethenian politician who trusts and helps Ai. When the book was first published, the gender theme touched off a feminist debate over the depiction of the ambisexual Gethenians. The novel also explores the interaction between the unfolding loyalties of its two main characters; the loneliness and rootlessness of Ai; and the contrast between the religions of Gethen's two major nations.

The Left Hand of Darkness has been reprinted more than 30 times, and it has received high praise from reviewers. In 1970, it was awarded the Hugo and Nebula Awards for Best Novel by fans and writers, respectively. Of the novel's impact, the literary critic Harold Bloom wrote, "Le Guin, more than Tolkien, has raised fantasy into high literature, for our time". The scholar Donna White wrote that the book was a seminal work of science fiction, comparing it to Mary Shelley's novel Frankenstein.

== Background ==
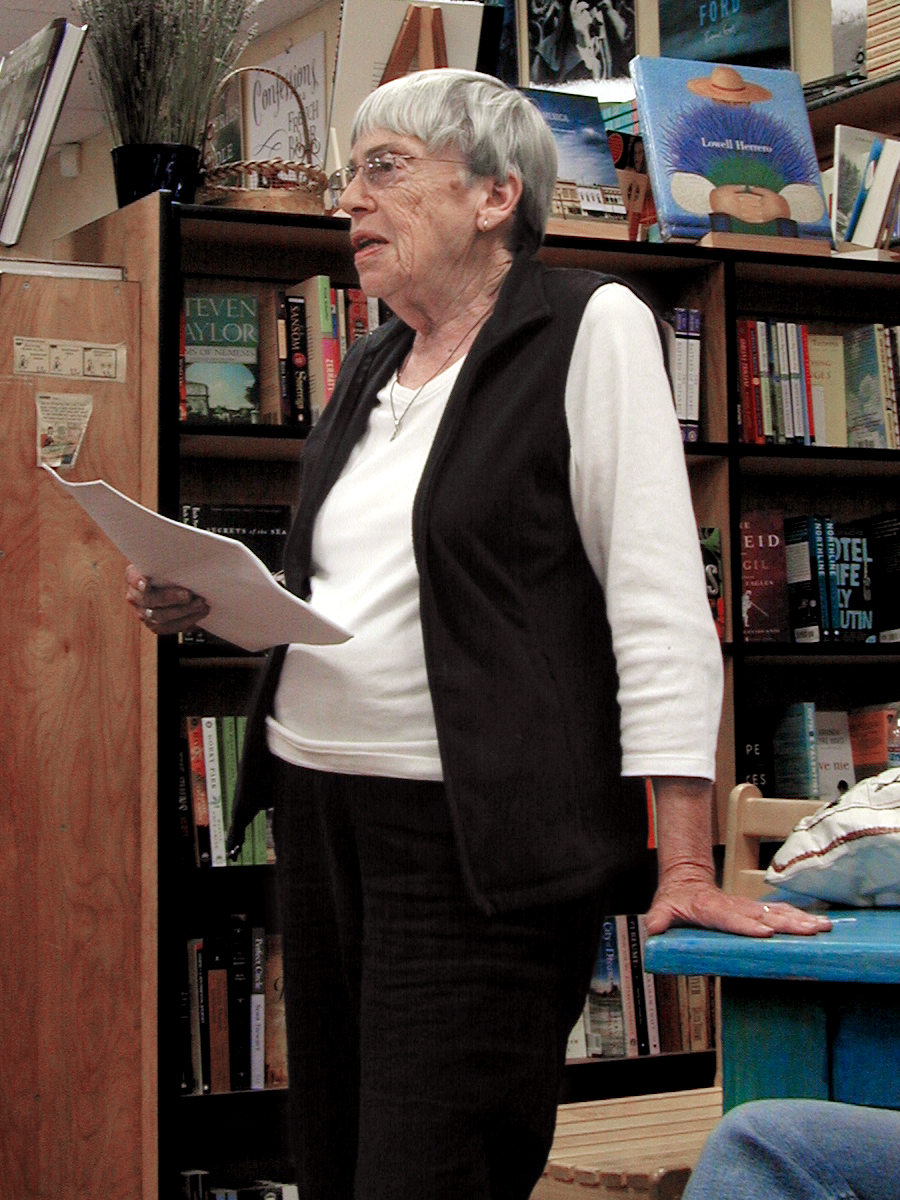
Le Guin giving a reading in 2008

Le Guin's father Alfred Louis Kroeber and mother Theodora Kroeber were scholars, and exposure to their anthropological work considerably influenced Le Guin's writing. The protagonists of many of Le Guin's novels, such as The Left Hand of Darkness and Rocannon's World, are also anthropologists or social investigators of some kind. Le Guin used the term Ekumen for her fictional alliance of worlds, a term coined by her father, who derived it from the Greek oikoumene to refer to Eurasian cultures that shared a common origin.

Le Guin's interest in Taoism influenced much of her science fiction work. According to academic Douglas Barbour, the fiction of the Hainish universe (the setting for several of Le Guin's works) contain a theme of balance between light and darkness, a central theme of Taoism. She was also influenced by her early interest in mythology, and her exposure to cultural diversity as a child. Her protagonists are frequently interested in the cultures they are investigating, and are motivated to preserve them rather than conquer them. Authors who influenced Le Guin include Victor Hugo, Leo Tolstoy, Virginia Woolf, Italo Calvino, and Lao Tzu.

Le Guin identified with feminism, and was interested in non-violence and ecological awareness. She participated in demonstrations against the Vietnam War and nuclear weapons. These sympathies can be seen in several of her works of fiction, including those in the Hainish universe. The novels of the Hainish cycle frequently explore the effects of differing social and political systems, although according to lecturer Suzanne Reid, Le Guin displayed a preference for a "society that governs by consensus, a communal cooperation without external government". Her fiction also frequently challenges accepted depictions of race and gender.

The original 1969 edition of The Left Hand of Darkness did not contain an introduction. After reflecting on her work, Le Guin wrote in the 1976 edition that the genre of science fiction was not as "rationalist and simplistic" as simple extrapolation. Instead, she called it a "thought experiment" which presupposes some changes to the world, and probes their consequences. The purpose of the thought experiment is not to predict the future, but to "describe reality, the present world". In this case, her thought experiment explores a society without men or women, where individuals share the biological and emotional makeup of both sexes. Le Guin has also said that the genre in general allows exploration of the "real" world through metaphors and complex stories, and that science fiction can use imaginary situations to comment on human behaviors and relationships.

In her new introduction to the Library of America reprint in 2017, the author wrote:

Up until 1968 I had no literary agent, submitting all my work myself. I sent The Left Hand of Darkness to Terry Carr, a brilliant editor newly in charge of an upscale Ace paperback line. His (appropriately) androgynous name led me to address him as Dear Miss Carr. He held no grudge about that and bought the book. That startled me. But it gave me the courage to ask the agent Virginia Kidd, who had praised one of my earlier books, if she’d consider trying to place The Left Hand of Darkness as a hardcover. She snapped it up like a cat with a kibble and asked to represent me thenceforth. She also promptly sold the novel in that format. I wondered seriously about their judgment. Left Hand looked to me like a natural flop. Its style is not the journalistic one that was then standard in science fiction, its structure is complex, it moves slowly, and even if everybody in it is called he, it is not about men. That's a big dose of "hard lit," heresy, and chutzpah, for a genre novel by a nobody in 1968.

== Setting ==
Map of Gethen, showing the lands of Karhide and Orgoreyn, and places visited by Genly Ai and Estraven

The Left Hand of Darkness is set in the fictional Hainish universe, which Le Guin introduced in her first novel Rocannon's World, published in 1966. In this fictional history, human beings did not evolve on Earth, but on Hain. The people of Hain colonized many neighboring planetary systems, including Terra (Earth) and Gethen, possibly a million years before the setting of the novels. Some of the groups that "seeded" each planet were the subjects of genetic experiments, including on Gethen. The planets subsequently lost contact with each other, for reasons that Le Guin does not explain. Le Guin does not provide the entire history of the Hainish universe at once, instead letting readers piece it together from various works.

The novels and shorter works recount the efforts to re-establish a galactic civilization. Explorers from Hain as well as other planets use interstellar ships traveling nearly as fast as light. These take years to travel between planetary systems, though the journey is shorter for the travelers due to relativistic time dilation. The society has access to instantaneous interstellar communication using the ansible, a device invented during the events described in The Dispossessed. This galactic civilization is known as the "League of All Worlds" in works set earlier in the chronology of the series, and has been reconstructed as the "Ekumen" by the time the events in The Left Hand of Darkness take place. During the events of the novel, the Ekumen is a union of 83 worlds, with some common laws. At least two "thought experiments" are used in each novel. The first is the idea that all humanoid species had a common origin as descendants of the original Hainish colonizers. The second idea is unique to each novel.

The Left Hand of Darkness takes place many centuries in the future; no date is given in the book itself. Reviewers have suggested the year 4870 AD, based on extrapolation of events in other works, and commentary on her writing by Le Guin. The protagonist of the novel, the envoy Genly Ai, is on an ice covered planet called Winter ("Gethen" in the language of its own people) to convince the citizens to join the Ekumen.

The inhabitants of Gethen are ambisexual humans; for twenty-four days (a period called somer in Karhidish, a Gethenian language) of each twenty-six-day lunar cycle, they are sexually latent androgynes. They only adopt sexual attributes once a month, during a period of sexual receptiveness and high fertility, called kemmer. During kemmer, they become sexually male or female, with no predisposition towards either, although which sex they adopt can depend on context and relationships. Throughout the novel Gethenians are described as "he", whatever their role in kemmer. This absence of fixed gender characteristics led Le Guin to portray Gethen as a society without war, and also without sexuality as a continuous factor in social relationships. On Gethen, every individual takes part in the "burden and privilege" of raising children, and rape and seduction are almost absent.

== Plot summary ==
Genly Ai, a male Terran native, is sent as the "first mobile" Envoy to invite the planet Gethen to join the Ekumen, a coalition of humanoid worlds. Ai travels on a starship which remains in solar orbit with Ai's companions in stasis. Like all envoys of the Ekumen, he can "mindspeak"—a form of quasi-telepathic speech which Gethenians are capable of, but of which they are unaware. He lands in the Gethenian kingdom of Karhide, and spends two years attempting to persuade the Karhide government of the value of joining the Ekumen. Karhide is one of two major nations on Gethen, the other being Orgoreyn. (Note: Le Guin mentions other minor nations on the planet, but they do not figure in the action of the novel.)

The novel begins the day before an audience that Ai has obtained with Argaven Harge, the king of Karhide. Ai manages this through the help of Estraven, the prime minister, who seems to believe in Ai's mission, but the night before the audience, Estraven tells Ai that he can no longer support Ai's cause with the king. Ai begins to doubt Estraven's loyalty because of his strange mannerisms, which Ai finds effeminate and ambiguous. The behavior of people in Karhide is dictated by shifgrethor, an intricate set of unspoken social rules and formal courtesy. Ai does not understand this system, which makes it difficult for him to understand Estraven's motives. The next day, as he prepares to meet the King, Ai learns that Estraven has been accused of treason, and exiled from the country. The pretext for Estraven's exile was his handling of a border dispute with the neighboring country of Orgoreyn, in which Estraven was seen as being too conciliatory. Ai meets with the king, who rejects his invitation to join the Ekumen. Discouraged, Ai decides to travel through Karhide, as the spring has just begun, rendering the interior of the frozen country accessible.

Ai travels to a Fastness, a dwelling of people of the Handdarata, one of two major Gethenian religions. He pays the fastness for a foretelling, an art practiced to prove the "perfect uselessness of knowing the answer to the wrong question". He asks if Gethen will be a member of the Ekumen in five years, expecting that the Foretellers will give him an ambiguous response, but he is answered "yes". This leads him to muse that the Gethenians have "trained hunch to run in harness". After several months of traveling through Karhide, Ai decides to pursue his mission in Orgoreyn, to which he has received an invitation.

In the Orgota capital, Ai finds the Orgota politicians are initially far more direct with him. He is given comfortable quarters, and is allowed to present his invitation to the council that rules Orgoreyn. Three members of the council, Shusgis, Obsle, and Yegey, are particularly supportive of him. These three are members of an "Open Trade" faction, which wants to end the conflict with Karhide. Estraven, who was banished from Karhide, is found working with these council members, and tells Ai that he was responsible for Ai's reception in Orgoreyn. Despite the support, Ai feels uneasy. Estraven warns him not to trust the Orgota leaders, and he hears rumors of the "Sarf", or secret police, that truly control Orgoreyn. He ignores both his feeling and the warning, and is once again blindsided; he is arrested unexpectedly one night, interrogated, and sent to a far-northern labor camp where he suffers from the harsh cold, is forced into hard labor, and given debilitating drugs. He becomes ill and his death seems imminent.

His captors expect him to die in the camp, but to Ai's great surprise, Estraven (whom Ai still distrusts) breaks Ai out of the farm. Estraven spends the last of his money on supplies, and then steals more, breaking his own moral code. The pair begin a dangerous 80-day trek across the northern ice sheet back to Karhide, because Estraven believes that the reappearance of Ai in Karhide will convince Karhide to accept the Ekumen treaty, knowing that Karhide will want the honor of doing so before Orgoreyn. Over the journey Ai and Estraven learn to trust and accept one another's differences. Ai is eventually successful in teaching Estraven mindspeech; Estraven hears Ai speaking in his mind with the voice of Estraven's dead sibling and lover Arek, demonstrating the close connection that Ai and Estraven have developed. When they reach Karhide, Ai sends a radio transmission to his ship, which lands a few days later. Betrayed by a friend they had trusted to hide them, Estraven tries to cross the land border back into Orgoreyn, but is killed by border guards, who also capture Ai. Estraven's prediction is borne out when Ai's presence in Karhide triggers the collapse of governments in both Karhide and Orgoreyn. Karhide agrees to join the Ekumen, followed shortly by Orgoreyn, completing Ai's mission. Ai struggles with his grief over Estraven's death, requesting that the King posthumously clear Estraven's name, and seeks out Estraven's hometown. He encounters Estraven's elderly father and the grown child he had with Arek. Though both are initially wary, given Estraven's still-public branding as a traitor, both request that Ai recount their travels together.

== Primary characters ==
=== Genly Ai ===
Genly Ai is the protagonist of the novel; a male native of Terra, or Earth, who is sent to Gethen by the Ekumen as a "first mobile" or envoy. He is called "Genry" by the Karhiders, who have trouble pronouncing the sound [l]. He is described as rather taller and darker than the average Gethenian. Although curious and sensitive to Gethenian culture in many ways, he struggles at first to trust the ambisexual Gethenians. His own masculine mannerisms, learned on Terra, also prove to be a barrier to communication. At the beginning of the book, he has been on Gethen for one year, trying to gain an audience with the king and persuade the Karhidish government to believe his story. He arrives equipped with basic information about the language and culture from a team of investigators who had come before him.

In Karhide, the king is reluctant to accept Ai's diplomatic mission. In Orgoreyn, Ai is seemingly accepted more easily by the political leaders, but then he is arrested, stripped of his clothes, drugged, and sent to a work camp. Rescued by Estraven, the deposed Prime Minister of Karhide, Genly realizes that cultural differences—specifically shifgrethor, gender roles and Gethenian sexuality—had kept him from understanding their relationship previously. During their 80-day journey across the frozen land to return to Karhide, Ai learns to understand and love Estraven.

=== Estraven ===
Therem Harth rem ir Estraven is a Gethenian from the Domain of Estre in Kerm Land, at the southern end of the Karhidish half of the continent. He is the Prime Minister of Karhide at the very beginning of the novel, until he is exiled from Karhide for attempting to settle the Sinoth Valley border dispute with Orgoreyn. Estraven is one of the few Gethenians who believe Ai, and he attempts to help him from the beginning, but Ai's inability to comprehend shifgrethor leads to severe misunderstanding between them.

Estraven is said to have made a taboo kemmering vow (love pledge) to his brother, Arek Harth rem ir Estraven, while they were both young. Convention required that they separate after they had produced a child together. Because of the first vow, a second vow Estraven made with another partner, Ashe Foreth, which was also broken before the events in Left Hand, is called a "false vow, a second vow". In contrast to Ai, Estraven is shown with both stereotypically masculine and feminine qualities, and is used to demonstrate that both are necessary for survival.

=== Argaven ===
Argaven Harge XV is the king of Karhide during the events of the novel. He is described both by his subjects and by Estraven as being "mad". He has sired seven children, but has yet to bear "an heir of the body, king son". During the novel he becomes pregnant but loses the child soon after it is born, triggering speculation as to which of his sired children will be named his heir. His behavior towards Ai is consistently paranoid; although he grants Ai an audience, he refuses to believe his story, and declines the offer to join the Ekumen. The tenure of his prime ministers tends to be short, with both Estraven and Tibe rising and falling from power during the two Gethenian years that the novel spans. Argaven eventually agrees to join the Ekumen due to the political fallout of Ai's escape from Orgoreyn and Estraven's death.

=== Tibe ===
Pemmer Harge rem ir Tibe is Argaven Harge's cousin. Tibe becomes the prime minister of Karhide when Estraven is exiled at the beginning of the novel, and becomes the regent for a brief while when Argaven is pregnant. In contrast to Estraven, he seems intent on starting a war with Orgoreyn over the Sinnoth Valley dispute; as well as taking aggressive actions at the border, he regularly makes belligerent speeches on the radio. He is strongly opposed to Ai's mission. He orders Estraven to be killed at the border at the end of the novel, as a last act of defiance, knowing that Estraven and Ai's presence in Karhide means his own downfall; he resigns immediately after Estraven's death.

=== Obsle, Yegey, and Shusgis ===
Obsle, Yegey, and Shusgis are Commensals, three of the thirty-three councillors that rule Orgoreyn. Obsle and Yegey are members of the "Open Trade" faction, who wish to normalize relations with Karhide. Obsle is the commensal of the Sekeve District, and was once the head of the Orgota Naval Trade Commission in Erhenrang, where he became acquainted with Estraven. Estraven describes him as the nearest thing to an honest person among the politicians of Orgoreyn. Yegey is the commensal who first finds Estraven during his exile, and who gives Estraven a job and a place to live in Mishnory. Shusgis is the commensal who hosts Genly Ai after Ai's arrival in Mishnory, and is a member of the opposing faction, which supports the Sarf, the Orgota secret police. Although Obsle and Yegey support Ai's mission, they see him more as a means of increasing their own influence within the council; thus they eventually betray him to the Sarf, in order to save themselves. Their Open Trade faction takes control of the council after Ai's presence in Karhide becomes known at the end of the novel.

== Reception ==
The Left Hand of Darkness has received highly positive critical responses since its publication. In 1970 it won both the Nebula Award, given by the Science Fiction Writers of America, and the Hugo Award, determined by science fiction fans. In 1987, science fiction news and trade journal Locus ranked it number two among "All-Time Best SF Novels", based on a poll of subscribers. (Note: In the 1987 poll, The Left Hand of Darkness ranked second to Frank Herbert's Dune (1965). In the 1975 version of the poll covering novels, Left Hand had ranked third behind Dune and Arthur C. Clarke's Childhood's End (1963).) The novel was also a personal milestone for Le Guin, with critics calling it her "first contribution to feminism". It was one of her most popular books for many years after its publication. By 2014, the novel had sold more than a million copies in English.

The book has been widely praised by genre commentators, academic critics, and literary reviewers. Fellow science fiction writer Algis Budrys praised the novel as "a narrative so fully realized, so compellingly told, so masterfully executed". He found the book "a novel written by a magnificent writer, a totally compelling tale of human peril and striving under circumstances in which human love, and a number of other human qualities, can be depicted in a fresh context". Darko Suvin, one of the first academics to study science fiction, wrote that Left Hand was the "most memorable novel of the year", and Charlotte Spivack regards the book as having established Le Guin's status as a major science-fiction writer. In 1987 Harold Bloom described The Left Hand of Darkness as Le Guin's "finest work to date", and argued that critics have generally undervalued it. Bloom followed this up by listing the book in his The Western Canon (1994) as one of the books in his conception of artistic works that have been important and influential in Western culture. In Bloom's opinion, "Le Guin, more than Tolkien, has raised fantasy into high literature, for our time".

Critics have also commented on the broad influence of the book, with writers such as Budrys citing it as an influence upon their own writing. More generally it has been asserted that the work has been widely influential in the science fiction field, with The Paris Review claiming that "No single work did more to upend the genre's conventions than The Left Hand of Darkness". Donna White, in her study of the critical literature on Le Guin, argued that Left Hand was one of the seminal works of science fiction, as important as Frankenstein, by Mary Shelley, which is often described as the very first science fiction novel. Suzanne Reid wrote that at the time the novel was written, Le Guin's ideas of androgyny were unique not only to science fiction, but to literature in general.

Left Hand has been a focus of literary critique of Le Guin's work, along with her Earthsea fiction and utopian fiction. The novel was at the center of a feminist debate when it was published in 1969. Alexei Panshin objected to the use of masculine "he/him/his" gender pronouns to describe its androgynous characters, and called the novel a "flat failure". Other feminists maintained that the novel did not go far enough in its exploration of gender. Criticism was also directed at the portrayal of androgynous characters in the "masculine" roles of politicians and statesmen but not in family roles. Sarah LeFanu, for example, wrote that Le Guin turned her back on an opportunity for experimentation. She stated that "these male heroes with their crises of identity, caught in the stranglehold of liberal individualism, act as a dead weight at the center of the novel". Le Guin, who identified as a feminist, responded to these criticisms in her essay "Is Gender Necessary?" as well as by replacing masculine pronouns with feminine ones in a later reprinting of "Winter's King", an unconnected short story set on Gethen. In her responses, Le Guin admitted to failing to depict androgynes in stereotypically feminine roles, but said that she considered and decided against inventing gender-neutral pronouns, because they would mangle the language of the novel. In the afterword of the 25th anniversary edition of the novel, she stated that "The Left Hand of Darkness is haunted and bedeviled by the gender of its pronouns", and that she no longer believed that the masculine pronoun in English is generic, as she had when she wrote the book.

== Themes ==
=== Hainish universe themes ===
Le Guin's works set in the Hainish universe explore the idea of human expansion, a theme found in the future history novels of other science-fiction authors such as Isaac Asimov. The Hainish novels, such as The Dispossessed, Left Hand, and The Word for World Is Forest, also frequently explore the effects of differing social and political systems. Le Guin believed that contemporary society suffered from a high degree of alienation and division, and her depictions of encounters between races, such as in The Left Hand of Darkness, sought to explore the possibility of "improved mode of human relationships", based on "integration and integrity". The Left Hand of Darkness explores this theme through the relationship between Genly Ai and Estraven; Ai initially distrusts Estraven, but eventually comes to love and trust him. Le Guin's later Hainish novels also challenge contemporary ideas about gender, ethnic differences, the value of ownership, and human beings' relationship to the natural world.

=== Sex and gender ===
A prominent theme in the novel is social relations in a society in which gender is irrelevant; in Le Guin's words, she "eliminated gender, to find out what was left". In her 1976 essay "Is Gender Necessary?", Le Guin wrote that the theme of gender was only secondary to the novel's primary theme of loyalty and betrayal. Le Guin revisited this essay in 1988, and stated that gender was central to the novel; her earlier essay had described gender as a peripheral theme because of the defensiveness she felt over using masculine pronouns for her characters.

The novel also follows changes in the character of Genly Ai, whose behavior shifts away from the "masculine" and grows more androgynous over the course of the novel. He becomes more patient and caring, and less rigidly rationalist. Ai struggles to form a bond with Estraven through much of the novel, and finally breaks down the barrier between them during their journey on the ice, when he recognizes and accepts Estraven's dual sexuality. Their understanding of each other's sexuality helps them achieve a more trusting relationship. The new intimacy they share is shown when Ai teaches Estraven to mindspeak, and Estraven hears Ai speaking with the voice of Estraven's dead sibling (and lover) Arek.

Feminist theorists criticized the novel for what they saw as a homophobic depiction of the relationship between Estraven and Ai. Both are presented as superficially masculine throughout the novel, but they never physically explore the attraction between them. Estraven's death at the end was seen as giving the message that "death is the price that must be paid for forbidden love". In a 1986 essay, Le Guin acknowledged and apologized for the fact that Left Hand had presented heterosexuality as the norm on Gethen.

The androgynous nature of the inhabitants of Gethen is used to examine gender relations in human society. On Gethen, the permanently male Genly Ai is an oddity, and is seen as a "pervert" by the natives; according to reviewers, this is Le Guin's way of gently critiquing masculinity. Le Guin also seems to suggest that the absence of gender divisions leads to a society without the constriction of gender roles. The Gethenians are not inclined to go to war, which reviewers have linked to their lack of sexual aggressiveness, derived from their ambisexuality. According to Harold Bloom, "Androgyny is clearly neither a political nor a sexual ideal" in the book, but that "ambisexuality is a more imaginative condition than our bisexuality. ... the Gethenians know more than either men or women". Bloom added that this is the major difference between Estraven and Ai, and allows Estraven the freedom to carry out actions that Ai cannot; Estraven "is better able to love, and freed therefore to sacrifice".

=== Religion ===
The book features two major religions: the Handdara, an informal system reminiscent of Taoism and Buddhism, and the Yomeshta or Meshe's cult, a close-to-monotheistic religion based on the idea of absolute knowledge of the entirety of time attained in one visionary instant by Meshe, who was originally a Foreteller of the Handdara, when attempting to answer the question: "What is the meaning of life?" The Handdara is the more ancient, and dominant in Karhide, while Yomesh is the official religion in Orgoreyn. The differences between them underlie political distinctions between the countries and cultural distinctions between their inhabitants. Estraven is revealed to be an adept of the Handdara.

Le Guin's interest in Taoism influenced much of her science fiction work. Douglas Barbour said that the fiction of the Hainish Universe contains a theme of balance between light and darkness, a central theme of Taoism. The title The Left Hand of Darkness derives from the first line of a lay traditional to the fictional planet of Gethen:

Light is the left hand of darkness,
and darkness the right hand of light.
Two are one, life and death, lying
together like lovers in kemmer,
like hands joined together,
like the end and the way.

Suzanne Reid stated that this presentation of light and dark was in strong contrast to many western cultural assumptions, which believe in strongly contrasted opposites. She went on to say that Le Guin's characters have a tendency to adapt to the rhythms of nature rather than trying to conquer them, an attitude which can also be traced to Taoism. The Handdarrata represent the Taoist sense of unity; believers try to find insight by reaching the "untrance", a balance between knowing and unknowing, and focusing and unfocusing.

The Yomesh cult is the official religion of Orgoreyn, and worships light. Critics such as David Lake have found parallels between the Yomesh cult and Christianity, such as the presence of saints and angels, and the use of a dating system based on the death of the prophet. Le Guin portrays the Yomesh religion as influencing the Orgota society, which Lake interprets as a critique of the influence of Christianity upon Western society. In comparison to the religion of Karhide, the Yomesh religion focuses more on enlightenment and positive, obvious statements. The novel suggests that this focus on positives leads to the Orgota being not entirely honest, and that a balance between enlightenment and darkness is necessary for truth.

=== Loyalty and betrayal ===
Loyalty, fidelity, and betrayal are significant themes in the book, explored against the background of both planetary and interplanetary relations. Genly Ai is sent to Gethen as an envoy of the Ekumen, whose mission is to convince the various Gethenian nations that their identities will not be destroyed when they integrate with the Ekumen. At the same time, the planetary conflict between Karhide and Orgoreyn is shown as increasing nationalism, making it hard for citizens of each country to view themselves as citizens of the planet.

These conflicts are demonstrated by the varying loyalties of the main characters. Genly Ai tells Argaven after Estraven's death that Estraven served mankind as a whole, just as Ai did. During the border dispute with Orgoreyn, Estraven tries to end the dispute by moving Karhidish farmers out of the disputed territory. Estraven believes that by preventing war he was saving Karhidish lives and being loyal to his country, while King Argaven sees it as a betrayal. At the end of the novel Ai calls his ship down to formalize Gethen's joining the Ekumen, and feels conflicted while doing so because he had promised Estraven that he would clear Estraven's name before calling his ship down. His decision is an example of Le Guin's portrayal of loyalty and betrayal as complementary rather than contradictory, because in joining Gethen with the Ekumen, Ai was fulfilling the larger purpose that he shared with Estraven. Donna White wrote that many of Le Guin's novels depict a struggle between personal loyalties and public duties, best exemplified in The Left Hand of Darkness, where Ai is bound by a personal bond to Estraven, but must subordinate that to his mission for the Ekumen and humanity.

The theme of loyalty and trust is related to the novel's other major theme of gender. Ai has considerable difficulty in completing his mission because of his prejudice against the ambisexual Gethenians and his inability to establish a personal bond with them. Ai's preconceived ideas of how men should behave prevents him from trusting Estraven when the two meet; Ai labels Estraven "womanly" and distrusts him because Estraven exhibits both masculine and feminine characteristics. Estraven also faces difficulties communicating with Ai, who does not understand shifgrethor, the Gethenians' indirect way of giving and receiving advice. A related theme that runs through Le Guin's work is that of being rooted or rootless in society, explored through the experiences of lone individuals on alien planets.

=== Shifgrethor and communication ===
Shifgrethor is a fictional concept in the Hainish universe, first introduced in The Left Hand of Darkness. It is first mentioned by Genly Ai, when he thinks to himself "shifgrethor—prestige, face, place, the pride-relationship, the untranslatable and all-important principle of social authority in Karhide and all civilizations of Gethen". It derives from an old Gethenian word for shadow, as prominent people are said to "cast darker [or longer] shadows". George Slusser describes shifgrethor as "not rank, but its opposite, the ability to maintain equality in any relationship, and to do so by respecting the person of the other". According to University of West Georgia Professor Carrie B. McWhorter, shifgrethor can be defined simply as "a sense of honor and respect that provides the Gethenians with a way to save face in a time of crisis".

Ai initially refuses to see a connection between his sexuality and his mode of consciousness, preventing him from truly understanding the Gethenians; thus he is unable to persuade them of the importance of his mission. Ai's failure to comprehend shifgrethor and to trust Estraven's motives leads him to misunderstand much of the advice that Estraven gives him. As Ai's relationship to Estraven changes, their communication also changes; they are both more willing to acknowledge mistakes, and make fewer assertions. Eventually, the two are able to converse directly with mindspeech, but only after Ai is able to understand Estraven's motivations, and no longer requires direct communication.

== Style and structure ==
The novel is framed as part of the report that Ai sends back to the Ekumen after his time on Gethen, and as such, suggests that Ai is selecting and ordering the material. Ai narrates ten chapters in the first person; the rest are made up of extracts from Estraven's personal diary and ethnological reports from an earlier observer from the Ekumen, interspersed with Gethenian myths and legends. The novel begins with the following statement from Ai, explaining the need for multiple voices in the novel:

I'll make my report as if I told a story, for I was taught as a child on my homeworld that Truth is a matter of the imagination. The soundest fact may fail or prevail in the style of its telling: like that singular organic jewel of our seas, which grows brighter as one woman wears it and, worn by another, dulls and goes to dust. Facts are no more solid, coherent, round, and real, than pearls are. But both are sensitive. The story is not all mine, nor told by me alone. Indeed I am not sure whose story it is; you can judge better. But it is all one, and if at moments the facts seem to alter with an altered voice, why then you can choose the fact that you like the best; yet none of them are false, and it is all one story.

The myths and legends serve to explain specific features about Gethenian culture, as well as larger philosophical aspects of society. Many of the tales used in the novel immediately precede chapters describing Ai's experience with a similar situation. For instance, a story about the dangers of foretelling is presented before Ai's own experience witnessing a foretelling. Other stories include a retelling of the legend of the "place inside the storm" (about two lovers whose vow is broken when societal strictures cause one to kill themself); another retelling the roots of the Yomeshta cult; a third is an ancient Orgota creation myth; a fourth is a story of one of Estraven's ancestors, which discusses what a traitor is. The presence of myths and legends has also been cited by reviewers who state that Le Guin's work, particularly Left Hand, is similar to allegory in many ways. These include the presence of a guide (Estraven) for the protagonist (Ai), and the use of myths and legends to provide a backdrop for the story.

The heterogeneous structure of the novel has been described as "distinctly post-modern", and was unusual for the time of its publication, in marked contrast to (primarily male-authored) traditional science fiction, which was straightforward and linear. In 1999, literary scholar Donna White wrote that the unorthodox structure of the novel made it initially confusing to reviewers, before it was interpreted as an attempt to follow the trajectory of Ai's changing views. Also in contrast to what was typical for male authors of the period, Le Guin narrated the action in the novel through the personal relationships she depicted.

Ai's first-person narration reflects his slowly developing view, and the reader's knowledge and understanding of the Gethens evolves with Ai's awareness. He begins in naivety, gradually discovering his profound errors in judgement. In this sense, the novel can be thought of as a Bildungsroman, or coming of age story. Since the novel is presented as Ai's journey of transformation, Ai's position as the narrator increases the credibility of the story. The narration is complemented by Le Guin's writing style, described by Bloom as "precise, dialectical—always evocative in its restrained pathos" which is "exquisitely fitted to her powers of invention".

== Legacy ==
The Eaton Collection of Science Fiction & Fantasy acquired the original cover art of The Left Hand of Darkness, by Leo and Diane Dillon.

== Adaptations ==
=== Film or TV ===
In December 2004, Phobos Entertainment acquired media rights to the novel and announced plans for a feature film and video game based on it. In early 2017, the novel was picked up for production by Critical Content as a television limited series with Le Guin signed on as a consulting producer.

=== Theater and radio ===
In 2013, the Portland Playhouse and Hand2Mouth Theatre produced a stage adaptation of The Left Hand of Darkness in Portland, Oregon. The first university production of Left Hand of Darkness premiered in the University of Oregon's Robinson Theater on November 3, 2017, with a script adapted by John Schmor. Many works of the transgender artist Tuesday Smillie exhibited at the Rose Art Museum take inspiration from the book. A puppet theater adaptation created by Edward Einhorn and Tom Lee, featuring bunraku style puppetry mixed with live actors, premiered at the Chicago International Puppet Theater Festival in January 2026.

On April 12 and 19, 2015, BBC Radio 4 broadcast a two-part adaptation of the novel, starring Kobna Holdbrook-Smith as Genly Ai, Lesley Sharp as Estraven, Toby Jones as Argaven, Ruth Gemmell as Ashe, Louise Brealey as Tibe and Gaum, Stephen Critchlow as Shusgis, and David Acton as Obsle. The radio drama was adapted by Judith Adams and directed by Allegra McIlroy. The adaptation was created and aired as part of a thematic month centered on the life and works of Ursula Le Guin, in honor of her 85th birthday.

== See also ==
- Biology in fiction
- Postgenderism
- "Coming of Age in Karhide", an unconnected short story about Gethenians.

== Sources ==
- "Ursula Le Guin's The Left Hand Of Darkness". BBC Radio 4. BBC.
- "Ursula K. Le Guin on Radio 4 and 4 Extra". BBC Radio 4. BBC. April 8, 2015.
- Bloom, Harold (2014). The Western Canon. Boston, Massachusetts, USA: Houghton Mifflin Harcourt. ISBN 978-0-547-54648-3.
- Bloom, Harold (1987). "Introduction". In Bloom, Harold (ed.). Modern Critical Interpretations: Ursula Le Guin's The Left Hand of Darkness. New York, New York, USA: Chelsea House Publications. pp. 1–10. ISBN 978-1-55546-064-8.
- Cummins, Elizabeth (1990). Understanding Ursula K. Le Guin. Columbia, South Carolina, USA: University of South Carolina Press. ISBN 978-0-87249-687-3.
- Fenner, Arnie (November 25, 2014). "The Artist: Leo and Diane Dillon". Tor.com.
- Fayad, Mona (1997). "Aliens, Androgynes, and Anthropology: Le Guin's Critique of Representation in "The Left Hand of Darkness"". Mosaic: An Interdisciplinary Critical Journal. 30 (3). University of Manitoba: 59–73. ISSN 0027-1276. JSTOR 44029822.
- Freeman, John (November 22, 2014). "Ursula Le Guin: She Got There First". The Boston Globe.
- "Galaxy Bookshelf". Galaxy Science Fiction: 144–58. February 1970.
- Harris, Dana (December 12, 2004). "Phobos Will Embrace 'Darkness': Shingle Planning Pic, Vidgame Based on Le Guin Tome". Variety.com.
- Hughley, Marty (May 5, 2013). "Theater Review: 'The Left Hand of Darkness' Finds Deeply Human Love on a Cold, Blue World". The Oregonian.
- Le Guin, Ursula K. (1980). The Left Hand of Darkness. New York, New York, USA: Harper & Row. ISBN 978-0-06-012574-5.
- Le Guin, Ursula K. (2017). Attebery, Brian (ed.). Introduction. The Hainish Novels and Stories. Vol. One. Library of America. ISBN 978-1-59853-537-2.
- Littleton, Cynthia (May 11, 2017). "Critical Content Developing Ursula K. Le Guin's 'Left Hand of Darkness' as Limited Series". Variety. Archived from the original on May 16, 2017.
- "Locus Poll Best All-time Novel Results". Locus Online. 1975. Archived from the original on May 1, 2015.
- "Locus Poll Best All-time Novel Results: 1987, sf novels". Locus. August 1987. Archived from the original on May 20, 2015.
- "Ursula K. Le Guin". The Locus Index to SF Awards: Index of Literary Nominees. Archived from the original on September 12, 2015.
- McWhorter, Carrie B. (1998). "Brandishing Shifgrethor: Le Guin's The Left Hand of Darkness". Notes on Contemporary Literature. 28: 11–12.
- Notario, Laurie; Stone, Jason (October 27, 2017). "From Darkness Into Stage Light". University of Oregon. Archived from the original on November 4, 2017.
- "Hear Ursula K. Le Guin's Pioneering Sci-Fi Novel, The Left Hand of Darkness, as a BBC Radio Play". Open Culture.com.
- Pennington, John (2000). "Exorcising Gender: Resisting Readers in Ursula K. Le Guin's Left Hand of Darkness". Extrapolation. 41 (4): 351–358. doi:10.3828/extr.2000.41.4.351.
- Reid, Robin Anne, ed. (2009). Women in Science Fiction and Fantasy. Westport, Connecticut, USA: Greenwood Press. ISBN 978-0-313-33589-1.
- Reid, Suzanne Elizabeth (1997). Presenting Ursula Le Guin. New York, New York, USA: Twayne. ISBN 978-0-8057-4609-9.
- Slusser, George Edgar (1976). The Farthest Shores of Ursula K. Le Guin. San Bernardino: Borgo Press. ISBN 0893702056.
- Spivack, Charlotte (1984). Ursula K. Le Guin (1st ed.). Boston, Massachusetts, USA: Twayne Publishers. ISBN 978-0-8057-7393-4.
- Stableford, Brian (1995). "Le Guin, Ursula K.: The Left Hand of Darkness". In Barron, Neil (ed.). Anatomy of Wonder 4. New Providence, New Jersey: R.R. Bowker. p. 300. ISBN 978-0-8352-3288-3.
- Watson, Ian (March 1975). "Le Guin's Lathe of Heaven and the Role of Dick: The False Reality as Mediator". Science Fiction Studies. 2: 67–75. doi:10.1525/sfs.2.1.0067. Archived from the original on March 12, 2015.
- White, Donna R. (1999). Dancing with Dragons: Ursula K. Le Guin and the Critics. Columbia, South Carolina, USA: Camden house. ISBN 978-1-57113-034-1.
- Wray, John. "Ursula K. Le Guin, The Art of Fiction No. 221". The Paris Review.
