= City of Illusions =

1967 science fiction novel by Ursula K. Le Guin

- Cover of first edition (paperback)
- Author: Ursula K. Le Guin
- Cover artist: Jack Gaughan
- Language: English
- Series: Hainish Cycle
- Genre: Science fiction
- Publisher: Ace Books
- Publication date: 1967
- Publication place: United States
- Media type: Print (Paperback)
- Pages: 160
- OCLC: 3516838
- Preceded by: Planet of Exile
- Followed by: The Left Hand of Darkness

City of Illusions is a 1967 science fiction novel by American writer Ursula K. Le Guin. It is set on Earth in the distant future, and it belongs to her Hainish Cycle. City of Illusions lays the foundation for this cycle, which creates a fictional universe in which the majority of Le Guin's science fiction novels take place.

== Plot introduction ==
City of Illusions takes place on Earth, also known as Terra, in the future, twelve hundred years after an enemy named the Shing has broken up the defunct League of All Worlds and taken up residence on Earth. The indigenous inhabitants of Earth have been reduced to small communities that are widely separated, living in highly independent rural communes, or in nomadic tribes. The Shing control the human population by using various strategies of indirect manipulation, which include divide and rule, as well as deceptive telepathic mental projection, known as mind-lying. In contrast, innately truthful telepathy, which is the only form of telepathy available to human beings, is known as mindspeech. The ability to lie during mindspeech is unique to the Shing.

Prior to the opening scene, the main character, who is a descendant of the protagonists in Planet of Exile, has been involved in a ship crash, and since the Shing do not believe in killing, has had his memory erased and been abandoned in the forest; this leaves his mind as a blank slate or tabula rasa. As the story begins he must develop a new self-identity ex nihilo.

== Plot summary ==
=== The man without a memory ===
The story starts as a man is found by a small community (housed in one building) in a forest area in eastern North America. He is naked except for a gold ring on one finger, has no memory except of motor skills at a level equivalent to that of a one-year-old and has bizarre, amber, cat-like eyes. The villagers choose to welcome and nurture him, naming him Falk (Yellow). They teach him to speak, educate him about the Earth, and teach him from a book they consider holy, which is Le Guin's "long-translated" version of the Tao Te Ching. Also they teach him about the nature of the never-seen Shing.

=== The journey ===
After six years, Falk is told by the leader of the community that he needs to understand his origins, and therefore sets off alone for Es Toch, the city of the Shing in the mountains of western North America. He encounters many obstacles to learning the truth about himself and about the Shing, along with evidence of the barbarism of current human society. Along the way, it is sometimes put to him that the image he holds of the Shing is a distorted one; that they respect the idea of 'reverence for life' and are essentially benevolent and non-alien rulers. This suggestion comes from Estrel, a young woman whom Falk meets after being captured by the Basnasska tribe in the great plains. Falk escapes this violent community with Estrel, to reach the city under her guidance. In the course of his journey Falk also encounters Shing-bred talking birds and animals who plead reverence for life in self-defense.

=== The Shing ===
Originally from an unknown, distant region of the galaxy, the Shing infiltrated and destroyed the League of All Worlds twelve hundred years before City of Illusions begins. The League had received prior warning of alien conquerors subduing distant worlds, and for generations had prepared defensive alliances and weaponry. However, when the Shing finally arrived, they were able to speedily subdue the 80 planets in the League, without encountering effective opposition.

The main weapon enabling this rapid and confused occupation is the Shing's ability to lie in mindspeech. The Shing closely resemble humans though they seem to be unable to interbreed with them. (Note: Le Guin's frequent description of deceptive clothing worn in Es Toch, and Shing's habitual lies (including that they are human) suggest that they are disguised non-humans.) Coming to Earth as invaders from a distant world the Shing, who are apparently not very many, establish themselves in a single fantastical city Es Toch. Under their rule the remainder of Earth declined into a thinly populated collection of backward and often mutually hostile tribal societies.

When Falk reaches Es Toch, Estrel betrays him into the hands of the Shing and laughs as she does so. He is told that he is part of the crew of a starship of alien / human hybrids from a planet called Werel. He meets a young man, Orry, who came with him in the ship. At this point it becomes clear that Estrel is a human collaborator working for the Shing, and that she had been sent to retrieve him from the wilds of the so-called Continent 1.

The Shing tell Falk that

- they are in fact humans;
- the conflict between the League and an alien invader never occurred: On the contrary, the League self-destructed through civil war and exploitation;
- the "enemy" is an invention of the Shing rulers themselves to try to ensure, through fear, that world peace endures under their benevolent, if misunderstood, governance;
- Falk's expedition was attacked by rebels who then erased Falk's memory of his previous self; and
- the Shing, who managed to save only Orry from the rebel attack, now want to restore Falk's previous identity.

Falk however believes that the Shing are non-human liars and that their true intent is to determine for their own purposes the location of his home planet. Ruling through "toolmen" – human collaborators who are either computer-controlled or who have been raised to accept the Shing as benign human overlords, the only principle that the Shing seem to adhere to is their law of Reverence for Life. They appear as pathological liars, though Falk, concludes that "the essence of their lying was a profound, irremediable lack of understanding" of the peoples that they have conquered. Shing character, culture, architecture, and even clothing, are deliberately ambiguous and illusory.

The Shing also appear to keep vegan lifestyle. Their "elaborately disguised foods were all vegetable" and their law of Reverence for Life is often expressed by the animals it is meant to protect. Throughout his journey to Es Toch, the City of Illusions, Falk encounters animals who instinctively repeat the spoken / telepathic admonition "Wrong to kill. Wrong to kill." Falk, however, suspects that this reverence is nothing more than a disguise for the Shing's own extreme fear of death.

=== Restored Memories ===
Seeing no other way forward, Falk consents to have his memory tampered with.

The mind of the original Werelian, Agad Ramarren, is restored and the Falk personality is ostensibly destroyed. He emerges as a new person with pre-Falk memories and vastly greater scientific knowledge. (Note: Ramarren's first name, Agad, recalls Jakob Agat, one of the chief protagonists of Planet of Exile, from whom he is descended.)

Having prepared a memory-restoring mnemonic trigger, that Falk had left for himself (an instruction, through young Orry, to read the beginning of the book he travels with, his translation of the Tao Te Ching), the Falk personality is revived. After some instability Falk's and Ramarren's minds come to coexist. By comparing the knowledge given to them before and after Ramarren's re-emergence, the joint minds are able to detect the essential dishonesty of the Shing's rule and the fact that the alien conquerors can lie telepathically. It was this power that had enabled the not-very-numerous Shing, "exiles or pirates or empire-builders from some distant star", to overthrow the League of All Worlds twelve centuries before.

The Werelians' mental powers are significantly greater than those of their human ancestors; they are able to recognize the Shing mind-lie, and cannot be subverted as the member-worlds in the League were. The Shing's cultural inhibition against killing and their dread of being killed leaves them with no effective defense against any armed and cautious expedition that arrived forewarned. Still ignorant of the survival of the Falk persona, the Shing hope to send Ramarren back to his home-world of Werel to present their idyllic story of Earth as a happy garden-planet prospering under their benign guidance, and in no need of outside help. Falk-Ramarren, now fully aware of the brutalized and misruled reality, pretends to accept this, postponing the return journey.

Eventually, while on a pleasure trip to view another part of the Earth, his Shing escort (Ken Kenyek) takes telepathic control of Ramarren but is then overcome by Falk, operating as a separate person. Now controlling Ken Kenyek, Falk-Ramarren makes his escape, manipulating his prisoner to find a light-speed ship that can take him home, and how to program it. (Note: While working through programming the parked ship to go to Werel, Remarren recognizes that Shing technology is based on an alien system of mathematics, totally different from the Cetian mathematics used on all the Hainish-descended human worlds.) Falk-Ramarren leaves for his planet of origin, taking Orry and the captive Ken Kenyek with him so that each can present their perception of Shing rule over Earth.

The military culture and recently restored advanced technology of the Werelians mean that Earth can probably be liberated "at a blow". However the light-years of travel required mean that Falk's forest friends will be long dead when he returns.

=== Epilogue embedded in Left Hand of Darkness ===
While City of Illusions concludes at this point, Falk-Ramarren's mission apparently succeeds in bringing freedom to the Earth. In The Left Hand of Darkness, the Terran diplomat Genly Ai refers to the "Age of the Enemy" as something dreadful that is now past. He also knows of the Werelians, now called Alterrans. The fate of the Shing is not mentioned, either there or in any later book.

== Characters ==
Falk-Ramarren
The protagonist of the story, an enigmatic and initially unnamed character, is given the name Falk after stumbling into a rural community as a full grown man, suffering from amnesia. As Falk, he lives for more than a half decade, developing a new personna and deep connections with the peaceful, technologically limited Forest People, into whose presence he had stumbled. Falk departs from them on a long, hazardous, trans-continental quest to learn his identity and history. The narrative then reveals his past as Ramarren, navigator of an expedition to Earth from the distant planet Werel, that had somehow been stripped of his memories. When those are restored, Falk-Ramarren comes to possess the skills, knowledge, and character of both his original self, and of the person he had become in is sojourn on Earth.
All-Alonio
A solitary, likewise enigmatic, and profound man Falk meets on his westward quest, who shelters Falk at a critical time, and gives him a "slider," a type of hovercraft or flying machine. He provides Falk with oblique but pertinent guidance, most notably that the Shing are few in number and rule through lies and illusion.
Estrel
Portrayed as Falk's ally and lover, Estrel is later shown to be a human agent of the Shing tasked with bringing him to Es Toch convinced of the beneficial nature of their rule. She wears a necklace which appears to have religious significance, but is actually a communication device. Estrel eventually suffers a psychotic break-down,[4] attempts to kill Falk, and suffers an unknown fate at the hands of the Shing.
Har Orry
A youth raised and largely brain-washed by the Shing. Other than Falk he is the only known survivor of the Werel expedition, two of whom were his parents. Like Estrel he is used by the Shing to convince Falk of their benign purposes. Passive and easily dominated he still shows traces of his childhood in a disciplined and hierarchical society.
Ken Kenyek
A Shing mindhandler and scientist that Falk who together with fellow Shing Lords Abundibot and Kradgy, attempt to deceive and manipulate Falk. These are the only characters in the book identified as being Shing. Ken Kenyek appears as a detached and analytical figure, lacking the more sinister traits of his two fellow aliens.
Parth
A young human woman of the Forest People, who helps re-educate Falk writing again on the tabula rasa that is Falk's narrative-opening psyche. After becoming his lover she is forced to bid him farewell, hearing his promise of return but sensing that he will not return in her lifetime.
Prince of Kansas
An elderly man who leads a sophisticated enclave of approximately 200 people living in the wilderness. He is in possession of luxuries such as a great library, domesticated dogs (otherwise extinct in this era), and a complex patterning frame that he uses to foretell Falk's future. His miniature society appears benign but quixotic – setting off fire-crackers to repulse occasional Shing "air-cars" as they fly uncaringly overhead.
Zove
The father-figure of the clan of Forest People that Falk stumbles upon before his quest, who helps Falk arrive at the conclusion that he must go on his quest, a figure that engages Falk in teaching-by-paradox (a method associated by a Le Guin scholar as resembling the sage Laozi).

== Publication history ==
City of Illusions was Le Guin's first novel that appeared as an independent paperback, unlike her earlier novels which appeared in the tête-bêche format. City of Illusions was initially published with no introduction, but Le Guin wrote an introduction for Harper & Row's 1978 hardcover edition. City of Illusions was re‑issued along with Rocannon's World and Planet of Exile in a 1978 omnibus volume titled Three Hainish Novels, and again in 1996 with the same novels in Worlds of Exile and Illusion.

== Literary significance and criticism ==
=== Reception ===
City of Illusions, like its two preceding Hainish novels, received little critical attention when it was published. Subsequently, it has not received as much critical attention as many of Le Guin's other works.

In terms of its place in the development of the canon of science fiction, it has been noted that City of Illusions combines the sensibility of traditional British Science Fiction, images from American genre Science Fiction and anthropological ideas.

Wood (1986), regarding the initial Hainish trilogy as a whole, notes that "innovative and entertaining fictions develop on the solid conceptual basis of human values affirmed" She goes on to point out that philosophical speculation is the most important element of the novel. Bain (1986) points out that City of Illusions, like Le Guin's novels The Left Hand of Darkness and The Dispossessed, is permeated with a "Taoist mythos".

One science fiction scholar points out that City of Illusions, along with Rocannon's World and Planet of Exile exhibits Le Guin's struggle as an emerging writer to arrive at a plausible, uniquely memorable and straightforward locale for her stories.

The author herself makes several comments about City of Illusions in her introduction to the 1978 hardback edition. Le Guin was excited to use her own translation of the Tao Te Ching. She was also interested in using physical and mental forests in the novel, and in imagining a less populated world, while still holding some type of civilization as a worthwhile, lofty ideal. Specifically she regrets the improbable and flawed depiction of the villains, the Shing, as not convincingly evil.

=== Themes ===
Defining and questioning the truth is the central issue of City of Illusions, which holds its roots in the always-truthful "mindspeech" introduced in Planet of Exile and the Shing's ambiguous variation on it, called the "mind-lie".

Correspondingly, themes of illusion and ambiguity are central to the novel. The story is as much a post industrial-collapse science fiction tale as it is a mystery tale. It starts with a man with no memory, and with eyes whose appearance suggests he is not human, raising questions as to his true nature: Is he human or alien, and is he a tool or a victim of the alien enemy, the Shing? The Shing's nature itself eventually comes into question through his journey. The theme of illusion and ambiguity is present throughout the book – both in terms of behavior (the main female character is initially a friend, then a betrayer, and ultimately maybe both) and even physical environment (the city Es Toch is a shimmering façade of visual deceptions).

Barbour (1986) points out that light / dark imagery is in an important and common thread that runs through Le Guin's initial Hainish trilogy, tying in closely with Taoism in the Tao-te Ching, a book that has special meaning to the main character. Specifically in City of Illusions the main character's story begins and ends in darkness, and among many other similar images, the city of Es Toch is described as a place of awful darkness and bright lights.

Although Le Guin based the location of Es Toch on the Black Canyon of the Gunnison National Park, Bittner (1986) points out that the city, like many of Le Guin's imaginary landscapes, is both an image and a symbol with underlying psychological value and meaning, in this case an underlying chasm. Wood (1986) furthers this notion pointing out the city is "built across a chasm in the ground, a hollow place."

Spivack (1984) points out that City of Illusions includes Le Guin's focus on the concept of contrasts, in particular the need for reconciliation of opposites, a concept related to Taoism, that must take place in Falk's divided mind.

One notable theme of City of Illusions is that of isolation and separation, with the story focusing heavily on one character who does not connect well with other characters.

A minor theme of exploring an oppressive male-dominated culture is present, represented by the misogynistic Bee-Keepers.

It has been suggested that the novel also explores theme of anarchism in the original village and its neighbors, which display communal living.

=== Objects ===
The patterning frame, a device which Falk encounters twice, is notable. He first sees a simple one at Zove's house and then later a more complex one that belongs to the Prince of Kansas. The device uses moveable stones on crossing wires as a representation of the physical world; its use as a fortune-telling device, computer, toy, or mystical implement is vague. Scholars have noted that it is a foreshadowing device and used to attain a coexistence of the past, present and future, a notable aspect of Taoism.

It has been suggested that the book The Old Canon, the book of the Way, the Tao Te Ching, has talismanic properties in the narrative. As a mere object it is an inspiring book; Falk is given a luxurious copy by Zove before he sets out on his travels. After Falk loses this copy, the Prince of Kansas gives him a replacement from his vast library.

Its first page is the mnemonic trigger that Falk uses to restore his memories and personality to his and Ramarren's shared mind after it is erased by the Shing (see above).

== Sources ==
- Bernardo, Susan M.; Murphy, Graham J. (2006). Ursula K. Le Guin: A Critical Companion (1st ed.). Westport, CT: Greenwood Press. ISBN 978-0-313-33225-8.
- Bloom, Harold, ed. (1986). Ursula K. Le Guin (1st ed.). New York, NY: Chelsea House. ISBN 978-0-87754-659-7.
- Cadden, Mike (2005). Ursula K. Le Guin Beyond Genre: Fiction for children and adults (1st ed.). New York, NY: Routledge. ISBN 978-0-415-99527-6.
- Le Guin, Ursula K. (1978). City of Illusions with a new Introduction by the author (hardback ed.). New York, NY: Harper & Row.
- Le Guin, Ursula K. (May 1992). The Language of the Night (revised ed.). HarperCollins. ISBN 978-0-06-016835-3.
- Le Guin, Ursula K. (1978). Three Hainish Novels (1st ed.). Nelson Doubleday.
- Le Guin, Ursula K. (1996). Worlds of Exile and Illusion (1st ed.). New York, NY: Orb. ISBN 978-0-312-86211-4.
- Spivack, Charlotte (1984). Ursula K. Le Guin (1st ed.). Boston, MA: Twayne Publishers. ISBN 978-0-8057-7393-4.
