= J. M. McDermott =

American novelist

J. M. McDermott (Joe M. McDermott) is an American writer of fantasy, and science fiction.

McDermott lives in Georgia, and holds an MFA in popular fiction from the University of Southern Maine and a BA in creative writing from the University of Houston.

His first novel, Last Dragon, was #6 on Amazon.com's Year's Best Science Fiction and Fantasy of 2008, shortlisted for a Crawford Prize for First Fantasy, and on Locus Magazine's Recommended Reading List for Debuts in 2008. His second novel, Never Knew Another is the beginning of the Dogsland Trilogy, from Nightshade Books. It received strong critical praise including a review by noted genre critic, John Clute, in Strange Horizons. The second novel of the trilogy was reviewed in Publishers Weekly, praising the depiction of the anti-hero of the novel.

== Books ==
- Last Dragon
- Never Knew Another
- When We Were Executioners
- Maze
- We Leave Together
- The Fortress At The End of Time
