= Rocannon's World =

1966 science fiction novel by Ursula K. Le Guin

- Cover of the first edition
- Author: Ursula K. Le Guin
- Cover artist: Gerald McConnell
- Language: English
- Series: Hainish Cycle
- Genre: Science fiction
- Published: 1966 (Ace Books)
- Publication place: United States
- Media type: Print (Paperback)
- Pages: 117
- ISBN: 0-8240-1424-3
- OCLC: 9159033
- Dewey Decimal: 813/.5/4
- LC Class: PZ4.L518 Ro4 PS3562.E42
- Followed by: Planet of Exile (1966)

Rocannon's World is a science fiction novel by American writer Ursula K. Le Guin, her debut novel. Published in 1966, it appeared as an Ace Double novel alongside Avram Davidson's The Kar-Chee Reign. (Note: The opening, entitled "Semley's Necklace", first appeared as the stand-alone story "The Dowry of Angyar", in Amazing Stories magazine in September 1964.) The novel is one of several of Le Guin's works that take place in the same universe and have relationships among characters and history, works that readers have termed the Hainish Cycle.

The novel's protagonist, "League of All Worlds" ethnographer Gaveral Rocannon, returns to the planet Fomalhaut II after its quarantine to lead a further advanced survey of its "higher intelligence life forms" (or "hilfs"). As the novel opens, a rebel faction of the League violently attacks Rocannon's ship, taking the lives of all of his colleagues—and, in foretelling an invasion, endangers the future of the planet's sentient species. Rocannon engages with three of these species, including the following:

- the tall, feudal, aristocratic Angyar
- two shorter, comparably intelligent species:
  - the troglodyte technologists and makers, the Gdemiar
  - the nontechnological, colonially telepathic Fiia.

The purpose is to battle both harsh planetary elements and other sentients to accomplish a quest—to beckon the distant League to block the invasion.

In developing the story, Le Guin introduces the term ansible as a key technology (and plot element) that allows instantaneous communication across vast distances. This term was later used more widely in science fiction, including by novelist Orson Scott Card and others.

== Plot summary ==
=== Prologue: The Necklace ===
The novel opens with a prologue occurring many years prior to its main action, entitled "The Necklace" (from an earlier published stand-alone story, "The Dowry of Angyar"). A young woman, Semley, the wife of an aristocrat of the Angyar people, decries the fate of husband and clan for its lack of wealth, a consequence of constraint against gain by spoils by war, imposed on them by extraterrestrial starlords that had visited. She recalls a precious necklace, a family heirloom of great value, lost to another of the sentient races of the planet, and departs covertly by flight on a windsteed—a large, winged, domesticated, cat-like species—to set out to reclaim her legacy, for the sake of her lord's and family's future.

Semley engages a troglodyte species of sentients, the Gdemiar, by whom she understands the heirloom to have been taken, descending with them into their subterranean dwelling. Despite that species having been favoured by the starlords—they were selected to serve as intermediaries between the starlords and planet sentients, and given means to engage the starlords—the Gdemiar show deference to the stately Angyar Lady, and agree to take Semley to those holding her heirloom. As she proceeds, it becomes clear that the means by which the Gdemiar engage the starlords takes the form of an automated spacecraft that the starlords—visiting scientists from the more advanced, interstellar "League of All Worlds"—have placed at the disposal of the Gdemiar, who they judged technologically most capable of the planet's sentients.

Hence, Semley takes a space voyage from the unnamed, technologically primitive planet, her destination an off-planet museum of collected ethnographic artifacts gathered by the League surveyors, Gaverel Rocannon and others. The survey scientists she engages are enthralled to meet this further, beautiful sentient, and gladly agree to return the artifact heirloom to her, and then to facilitate her return to Angyar. Unfortunately, the time dilation associated with her travel means that while of short duration for Semley, 16 years have passed on her planet, and with her lord and family. She returns with her prize, and is met by an old woman that she does not recognise, but who is a peer and confidante from her life before departure. She learns that her lord and husband has perished in an intervening battle in her absence, and that the young daughter she had left is now a grown woman.

=== The Starlord, The Wanderer, and Epilogue ===
The novel then follows Gaverel Rocannon, one of the ethnologists who met Semley at the museum. Years after meeting Semley, Rocannon embarks on an ethnological mission to her planet, Fomalhaut II. It was through Rocannon's efforts that the planet had been placed under an 'exploration embargo' in order to protect the native cultures. Unbeknown to him and his colleagues, the planet hosts a base of an enemy of the League of All Worlds: a young world named Faraday, which embarked on a career of interstellar war and conquest, and which chose this "primitive" world as the location of a secret base. After this enemy destroys his ship and his companions, Rocannon sets out to find their base so that he can alert the League of their presence with the enemy's ansible. He must rely on alliances with the sentient species of the planet, and he must use other means of travel, including walking, boating, and riding on the back of windsteeds, the large, winged cat-like domesticated carnivores of the Angyar.

His long and dangerous quest, undertaken with seven loyal companions : Mogien (Semley's grandson), Kyo (a Fian who survived the destruction of his village by the enemy), and four Olgyior men, the most notable of which is named Yahan. Their journey towards the South, where the enemy's base is expected to be located, take them through many lands, where they encounter various other cultures and species of the planet and face numerous threats and obstacles that are unrelated to the enemy he intends to confront. He eventually recognises, in addition to his human-like companions, the Liuar of Angyar, four further species that bring to five the "hilfs" earlier identified: the dwarf-like Gdemiar, the elf-like Fiia, the nightmarish Winged Ones, and the rodent-like Kiemhrir. Increasingly, as the plot progresses, Rocannon's experiences impact his personality, making him more attuned to the planet's culture than with his previous interstellar sophisticate role. Before the final encounter, Rocannon has an intense encounter with an entity in a mountainside cave. Here, in exchange for "giving himself to the planet", he receives the gift of mindspeech, a form of telepathy more common to the Gdemiar.

Finally, after traveling halfway across the globe and suffering much loss and bereavement, the party reaches the enemy's stronghold, set in a land unknown to Rocannon and the Angyar, and occupied by distant relatives of the Angyar. Rocannon reverts from the effective role of a Bronze Age hero, into which he had been increasingly pushed during most of the book, and returns to his role as the resourceful operative of an interstellar civilization. He uses his mindspeech abilities to formulate a plan and successfully infiltrate the enemy base, entering one of the faster-than-light (FTL) ships. This he uses to send a communication, using its ansible, to alert his command, at the nearest base of the League of All Worlds, relaying to them the nature and layout of the base, and its planetary location.

Rocannon escapes via windsteed, although unsure until the last moment that his message has been received, and that he can and has succeeded in putting enough distance between himself and the base to survive. Shortly thereafter, Rocannon experiences the flash of light indicative that the base has been destroyed—the League has responded to his message with an unmanned Faster-Than-Light (FTL) ship, to destroy the enemy installation. (Note: Life cannot survive FTL travel in the Hainish universe, so all FTL ships must be unmanned.) Because of his new telepathic ability, Rocannon feels the shock of the deaths of a thousand men, occurring in that moment.

After the completion of his quest, Rocannon retires with the Angyar of the south continent, surrounded by sympathetic people, including the woman he would marry. When rescuers from the League arrive nine years later, they find that he has died. (Note: There is a 9-year delay because in the Hainish universe, living beings must travel below light speed.) He could not know that as a result of his saving communication, the planet has been named after him.

== Literary significance and criticism ==
Rocannon's World along with its two sequels combine emerging British New Wave science fiction sentiments with established American genre imagery and Le Guin's signature anthropological interests into a tale of loss, companionship, isolation, redemption and love.

Science fiction scholar Andy Sawyer points out that Rocannon's World, along with Planet of Exile and City of Illusions exhibits Le Guin's struggle as an emerging writer to arrive at a plausible, uniquely memorable and straightforward locale for her stories. The tropes in Rocannon's World adhere closely to those of high fantasy, with Clayfolk resembling Dwarves and the Fiia resembling Elves, especially in their dialogue. Additionally, Rocannon's World is noted to be a lightly disguised fantasy in which the legendary characters are easily interpreted by the readers as characters from the real world's future.

Polish literature scholar Anita Całek discussed the work in the context of the concepts of otherness and anthropocentrism.

Robert Silverberg described the novel as "superior space opera, good vivid fun ... short, briskly told, inventive and literate."

== Publication history ==
Rocannon's World was initially published with no introduction, but Le Guin wrote an introduction for Harper & Row's 1977 hardcover edition. Rocannon's World was also issued in a 1978 book club omnibus along with Planet of Exile and City of Illusions in a volume called Three Hainish Novels and in a 1996 volume with the same novels titled Worlds of Exile and Illusion.

== Sources ==
- Bernardo, Susan M.; Murphy, Graham J. (2006). Ursula K. Le Guin: A Critical Companion (1st ed.). Westport: Greenwood Press. ISBN 978-0-313-33225-8.
- Bloom, Harold, ed. (1986). Ursula K. Le Guin (1st ed.). New York: Chelsea House. ISBN 978-0-87754-659-7.
- Cadden, Mike (2005). Ursula K. Le Guin Beyond Genre: Fiction for Children and Adults (1st ed.). New York: Routledge. ISBN 978-0-415-97218-5.
- Le Guin, Ursula K. (May 1992). The Language of the Night (revised ed.). HarperCollins. ISBN 978-0-06-016835-3.
- Le Guin, Ursula K. (1978). Three Hainish Novels (1st ed.). Nelson Doubleday. ASIN B000H6R3Q6.
- Le Guin, Ursula K. (1996). Worlds of Exile and Illusion (1st ed.). New York: Orb. ISBN 978-0-312-86211-4.
- Morse, Donald E.; Matolcsy, Kalman (2011). The Mythic Fantasy of Robert Holdstock: Critical Essays on the Fiction (1st ed.). London: McFarland & Company, Inc. ISBN 978-0-7864-4942-2.
- Spivack, Charlotte (1984). Ursula K. Le Guin (1st ed.). Boston: Twayne Publishers. ISBN 978-0-8057-7430-6.
