= Ciro =

Ciro is a name originally related to Cyrus the Great (the king of Persia):

- Ciro (given name), a list of the people who share the Italian and Spanish given name
- Ćiro (given name), a list of the people who share the Croatian given name
- Ciro (opera), 1654 opera by Francesco Cavalli
- Cyrus Cuneo (1879-1916), Italian American artist who was generally known as Ciro
- Ciro, one of the nicknames given to the holotype specimen of Scipionyx

CIRO is also an abbreviation for:

- Canadian Investment Regulatory Organization, an organization that sets regulatory and investment industry standards in Canada
- Cabinet Intelligence and Research Office, the national civilian intelligence agency of Japan

== See also ==
- Cirò (disambiguation)
- Ciro's, nightclub in Los Angeles
- Ciro's (London), a branch of a nightclub/restaurant chain 1897—?
