= Ciro (given name) =

Ciro is an Italian (Italian: [ˈtʃiːro]) and Spanish given name related to Cyrus. Notable people with the given name include:

- Ciro Alegría (1909–1967), Peruvian journalist, politician and novelist
- Ciro Henrique Alves Ferreira e Silva (born 1989), Brazilian footballer
- Ciro Annunchiarico (1775–1817), Italian cult leader
- Ciro Bustos (1932–1959), Argentine painter
- Ciro Cappellari (born 1959), Argentine filmmaker
- Ciro Chapa (1901-?), Mexican long-distance runner
- Ciro Cirillo (1921–2017), Italian politician
- Ciro Cruz Zepeda (1945–2022), Salvadoran politician
- Ciro Danucci (born 1983), Italian footballer
- Ciro Denza (1844–1915), Italian painter
- Ciro Díaz, Cuban composer and guitarist
- Ciro Ferrara (born 1967), Italian footballer and football manager
- Ciro Galvani (1867–1956), Italian stage and film actor
- Ciro Gálvez (born 1961), Peruvian lawyer, songwriter, professor and politician
- Ciro Ginestra (born 1978), Italian footballer and football manager
- Ciro Gomes (born 1957), Brazilian politician, lawyer and academic
- Ciro Guerra (born 1981), Colombian film director and screenwriter
- Ciro Immobile (born 1990), Italian footballer
- Ciro Ippolito (born 1947), Italian film director, screenwriter and producer
- Ciro Liguori (born 1969), Italian rower
- Ciro Mancuso (born 1949), American cannabis trafficker
- Ciro Menotti (1798–1831), Italian patriot
- Ciro Nogueira Lima Filho (born 1968), Brazilian lawyer and politician
- Ciro Ocampo (born 1947), Argentine retired footballer
- Ciro Pavisa (1890–1972), Italian painter
- Ciro Pertossi (born 2000), Argentine rugby player and convicted criminal
- Ciro Pertusi (born 1968), Argentine musician
- Ciro Pessoa (1957–2020), Brazilian singer-songwriter, screenwriter, writer and activist
- Ciro Pinsuti (1829–1888), Anglo-Italian composer
- Ciro Procuna, Mexican sports announcer
- Ciro de Quadros (1940–2014), Brazilian public health doctor
- Ciro Quispe López, Peruvian Roman Catholic bishop
- Ciro Rodriguez (born 1946), American politician
- Ciro Sena Júnior (born 1982), Brazilian footballer
- Ciro Sirignano (born 1985), Italian footballer
- Ciro Terranova (1888−1938), American gangster
