= Cirò =

Cirò can refer to:

- Cirò, Calabria, an Italian comune in the province of Crotone
- Cirò Marina, an Italian comune in the province of Crotone
- Cirò (wine), a wine made in the environs of Cirò

== See also ==
- Ciro (disambiguation)
- Ćiro, a given name
