= Gordes =

Gordes Gòrda (Occitan)
- Commune

- Coat of arms
- Location of Gordes
- Location within France Location within Provence-Alpes-Côte d'Azur
- Coordinates: 43°54′43″N 5°12′03″E
- Country: France
- Region: Provence-Alpes-Côte d'Azur
- Department: Vaucluse
- Arrondissement: Apt
- Canton: Apt
- Intercommunality: CA Luberon Monts de Vaucluse

Government
  - Mayor (2020–2026): Richard Kitaeff
- Area^{1}: 48.04 km^{2} (18.55 sq mi)
- Elevation: 373 m (1,224 ft)
- Highest elevation: 635 m (2,083 ft)
- Lowest elevation: 111 m (364 ft)
- Population (2023): 1,661
  - Density: 34.58/km^{2} (89.55/sq mi)
- Time zone: UTC+01:00 (CET)
  - Summer (DST): UTC+02:00 (CEST)
- INSEE/Postal code: 84050 /84220
- ^{1} French Land Register data, which excludes lakes, ponds, glaciers > 1 km^{2} (0.386 sq mi or 247 acres) and river estuaries.

Gordes (French pronunciation: [ɡɔʁd]; Occitan: Gòrda) is a commune in the Vaucluse department in the Provence-Alpes-Côte d'Azur region in southeastern France. The residents are known as Gordiens. The nearest big city is Avignon; smaller settlements nearby include Cavaillon, L'Isle-sur-la-Sorgue and Apt.

The town is one of the most visited villages in the Luberon Regional Natural Park. It is located on the outskirts of the Park in the Monts de Vaucluse, which faces the northern slope of the Luberon mountain.

The town is a member of Les Plus Beaux Villages de France (The Most Beautiful Villages of France) Association due to its heritage: two abbeys, a castle, many old hamlets, hundreds of dry stone huts (bories), several windmills and water-mills, fountains, wash houses, and bories, a type of basin chiseled in rock.

According to the ranking of the most beautiful villages in the world published on 12 February 2023 on the website of Travel + Leisure, an American travel magazine, Gordes is considered the "most beautiful village in the world," ahead of the Japanese village of Shirakawa-go and Giethoorn in the Netherlands.

== Geography ==
The territory of Gordes occupies some of "Les Monts de Vaucluse", a group of mountains and hills, part in the valley of the Calavon (a local river) also called the "Luberon Valley".

=== Neighboring communes ===
Neighboring villages are Venasque and Murs to the north, Joucas and Roussillon to the east, Goult, Saint-Pantaléon, Beaumettes and Oppède to the south and Cabrières-d'Avignon and Saumane-de-Vaucluse to the west.

=== Topography ===
Located between two geographic areas, Gordes is one of the biggest communes of the area with 4,804 hectares. The north is defined by the southern edge of the Vaucluse Mountains. The highest point of the commune (635 meters) is in this area, next to la Pouraque and les Trois Termes. The south of the commune is the Calavon valley, also called the Luberon Valley, and a few hills in the area. The lowest height of the commune, at 111 meters, is in the south in the area called plan de l'Alba.

The village itself is located in the center of the commune, on a giant calcareous rock from the Vaucluse Mountains, dominating the valley.

=== Geology ===
With a wide variation of the land, geology of the commune is divided into several distinct zones.

In the north, on the Vaucluse Mountains, are soils dating mainly from the Upper Jurassic with Urgonian limestone and calcareous clay. There are also, in very low amounts and primarily localized over the Senanque Abbey, soils dating from the Eocene/Oligocene, composed of limestone, sand, and clay.

Geology to the south of the village is more complex. The plain of Gordes (southeast) is composed of soil dating from the Quaternary (fluvial deposits, colluvium and scree) and soils of the Late Jurassic period (calcareous clay and blue marl). The hills area of "les garrigues" (in the south) is composed of soil dating from the Cretaceous – Paleocene period (calcareous sandstone, calcareous lacustrine clay, colorful, white and ocher sands and some ferruginous) and from the Miocene period (molasses limestone, sand and marl). Finally, the soil of the territory down to the plain of Calavon with some slightly higher ground dating from the Miocene and one lower from the Quaternary.

=== Climate ===
Gordes has a Mediterranean climate characterised by relatively dry summers and cool, damp winters. The city is often subject to windy weather; the strongest wind is the mistral.

In summer, high temperatures associated with a reduced amount of rain creates a drought of almost one or two months a year according to the Gaussen Index (temperatures in Celsius degrees twice higher than rains in millimeters).

== History ==
The name "Gordes" derives from the Celtic word "Vordense". Vordense was pronounced Gordenses, then Gordae/Gordone, and finally Gòrda then translated into French "Gordes".

=== Early history ===
Occupation by the Roman empire. The area is full of evidence of their occupation especially the Roman road passing through Apt and Carpentras and crossing the valley. Gallo-Roman remains were found in "Bouisses" district (skeletons, amphorae, columns) or Gallo-Roman substructures in the hamlet of "les Gros".

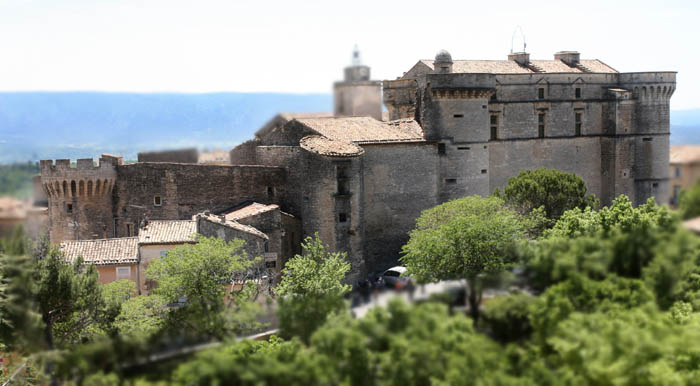
The view from north of the castle shows the ancient and the Renaissance parts.

=== Middle Ages and Renaissance ===
In the 8th century, a Benedictine abbey known as Saint-Chaffret was founded by monks of the Abbey of Saint-Chaffre in Monastier-en-Velay on the site of an ancient cella (Roman temple) destroyed during the Arab invasions.

In 1031, a castle was built and the Latin word "castrum" was added to what thus became "Castrum Gordone". The castle was re-enforced in 1123 to become a "nobile castrum", the only one known among the many castles nearby.

In 1148, the Sénanque Abbey was established under the patronage of Alfant, Bishop of Cavaillon, and Ramon Berenguer II, Count of Barcelona, Count of Provence, by Cistercian monks who came from Mazan Abbey in the Ardèche.

After the death of King René of Provence, the territory of Provence was incorporated in 1481 into the kingdom of France as a "province royale française" (French royal province). An insurrection broke out in the former states of Agoult-Simiane and County of Forcalquier. Gordes is distinguished by a strong opposition to French centralism but will pay heavily for its claims of independence. A year later, with the wedding of his son, Jacques Raybaud de Simiane takes the title of "Baron de Gordes".

=== Second World War ===
During World War II, Gordes was an active resistance village and was later awarded a medal, the Croix de guerre 1939–1945.

On 21 August 1944, almost a week after the beginning of the Operation Dragoon on the Provençal coast, a German patrol was attacked by the resistance. The day after, 22 August, the village was subject to violent reprisals. The Germans forced the inhabitants to enter their homes, shooting those who were late or that were not cooperating, and started to shoot from the rock on the other side with a cannon and destroyed a dozen houses. On the other side of the village, the rest of the troops set fire to a chariot, pieces of wood and houses, blocking potential followers. More than twenty houses were destroyed. After the Liberation the resistance destroyed another part of the village, including the notarial house with all the archives. All this destruction brought the municipality the sad privilege to appear amongst three "stricken cities" of the Vaucluse department. By war's end, thirteen persons had been killed or executed in Gordes, twenty inhabitants had been shot by the enemy and five inhabitants were deported.

=== After World War II ===
After a period of reconstruction, the village began to attract artists including Marc Chagall and Jean Deyrolle, who discovered the village in 1947, and who attracted their artist friends including Serge Poliakoff, Victor Vasarely and Jean Dewasne.

=== Armory ===
The primary ones are reported in 1696 in the Armorial Général de France and coming from the Gordes-Simiane family.

Arms of the Gordes family	The arms of the Gordes family are blazoned : "de gueules à une gourde d'or".

Arms of the Simiane family	The arms of the Simiane family are blazoned : "d'or semé alterné de tours et de fleurs de lys d'azur".

1984's armory	In 1984, new arms are created : "Mantelé d'or à deux gourdes de gueules, et de gueules à une gourde d'or". The design is clearly based on the Gordes family armory in terms of colors and form.

=== Other historical language names ===
Occitan: Gòrda in classical norm of provencal, Gordo in Mistralian norm

== Administration ==
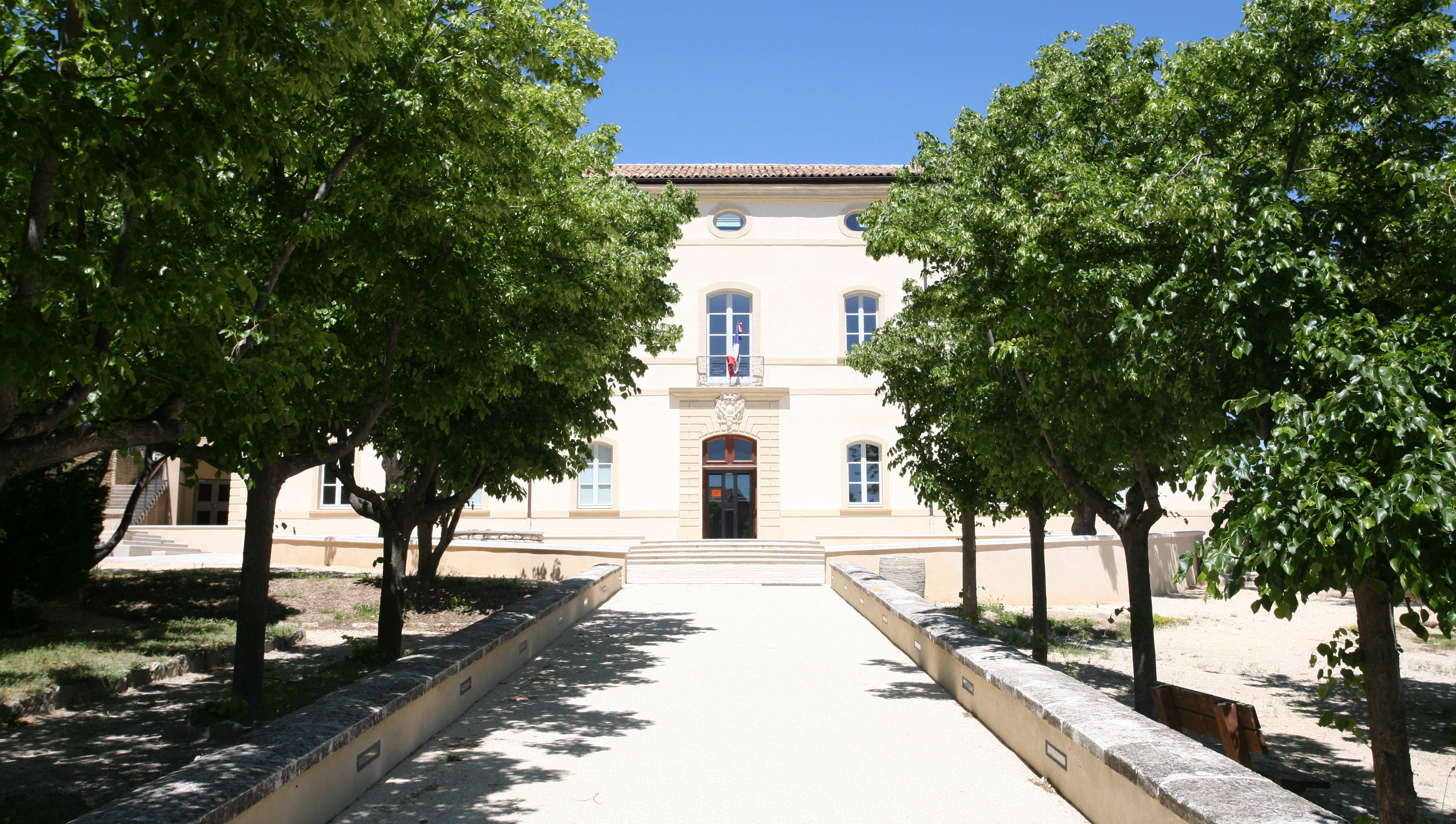
The "Hotel Simiane", historical building with the new town office.

The commune of Gordes has numerous infrastructures of public utility like the "gendarmerie", the fire brigade, the post office, a tax office, a library, etc.

=== Sister cities ===
- Annet-sur-Marne, France, since 1985.

=== Fiscality ===
Taxation of households and businesses in Gordes in 2009
Tax	Communal part	Intercomunal part	Part for the department	Part for region
Housing tax	6.56%	0.00%	7.55%	0.00%
Property tax on built properties	9.83%	0.00%	10.20%	2.36%
Property tax on non-built properties	38.51%	0.00%	28.96%	8.85%
Business Tax	00.00%	19.99%	13.00%	3.84%

== Demographics ==
Historical population

Year	Pop.	±% p.a.
1793	2,807	—
1800	2,812	+0.03%
1806	3,010	+1.14%
1821	2,956	−0.12%
1831	2,848	−0.37%
1836	2,867	+0.13%
1841	2,891	+0.17%
1846	3,008	+0.80%
1851	2,948	−0.40%
1856	2,899	−0.33%
1861	2,937	+0.26%
1866	2,805	−0.92%
1872	2,594	−1.29%
1876	2,512	−0.80%
1881	2,204	−2.58%
1886	2,010	−1.83%
1891	1,767	−2.54%
1896	1,638	−1.50%
1901	1,562	−0.95%

Year	Pop.	±% p.a.
1906	1,447	−1.52%
1911	1,360	−1.23%
1921	1,057	−2.49%
1926	1,069	+0.23%
1931	1,111	+0.77%
1936	1,165	+0.95%
1946	953	−1.99%
1954	1,075	+1.52%
1962	1,363	+3.01%
1968	1,536	+2.01%
1975	1,574	+0.35%
1982	1,607	+0.30%
1990	2,031	+2.97%
1999	2,092	+0.33%
2007	2,130	+0.23%
2012	2,001	−1.24%
2017	1,773	−2.39%
2023	1,661	−1.08%

Source: EHESS and INSEE

== Land use ==
Type of ground occupation	Percentage	Size (in hectares)
Urban zones	9,19%	451,34
Agricultural zones	34,43%	1 690,74
Natural Zones	56,38%	2 768,14
Total	100%	4 910,22

== Architecture ==
=== Sights ===
Located in the middle of the village, the castle, which was partially rebuilt in Renaissance style in 1525, is a major tourist attraction.

In the immediate vicinity of Gordes is the Romanesque Sénanque Abbey (Cistercian) and the Village des Bories, a village of dry stone huts that is now a museum.

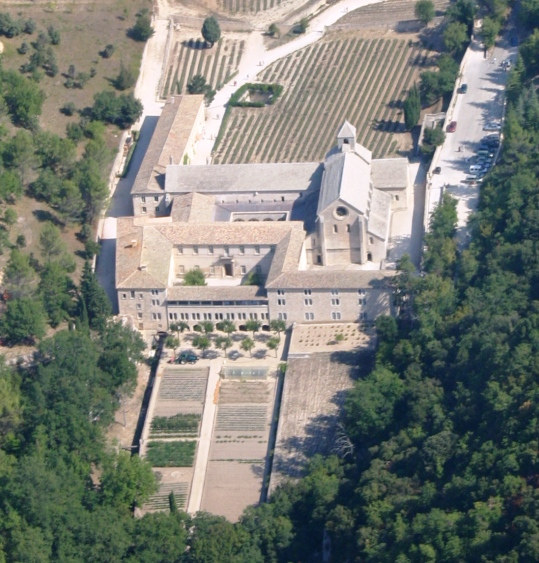
Sénanque Abbey.

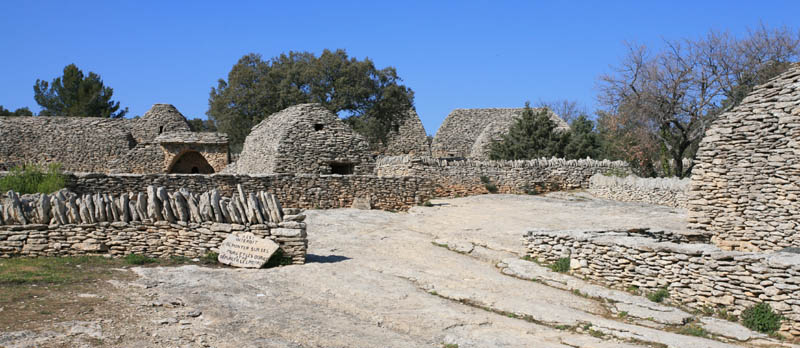
Village des Bories.

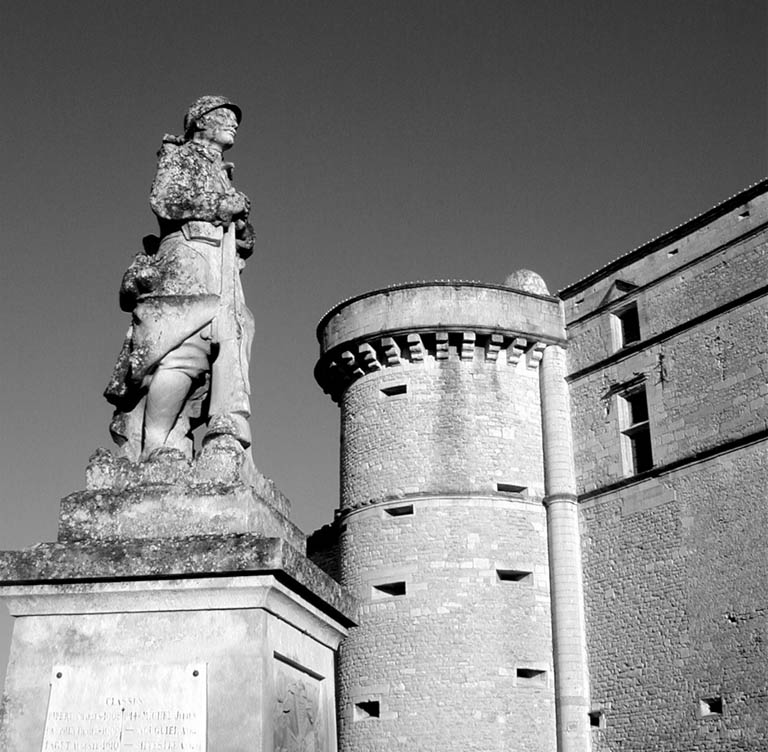
The war memorial and the castle

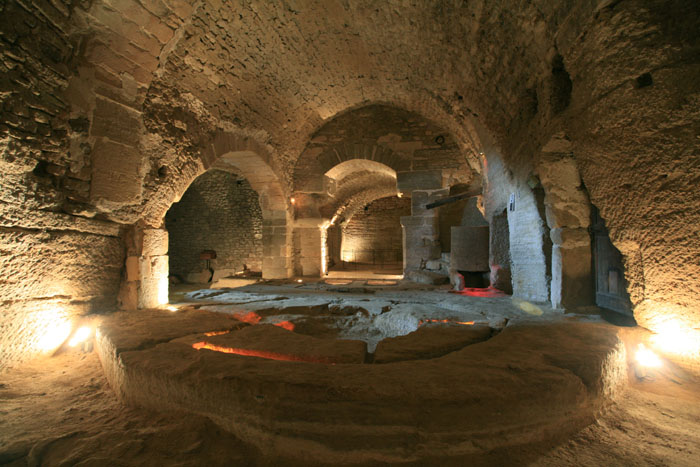
The Saint-Firmin Palace cellars

=== Building regulations ===
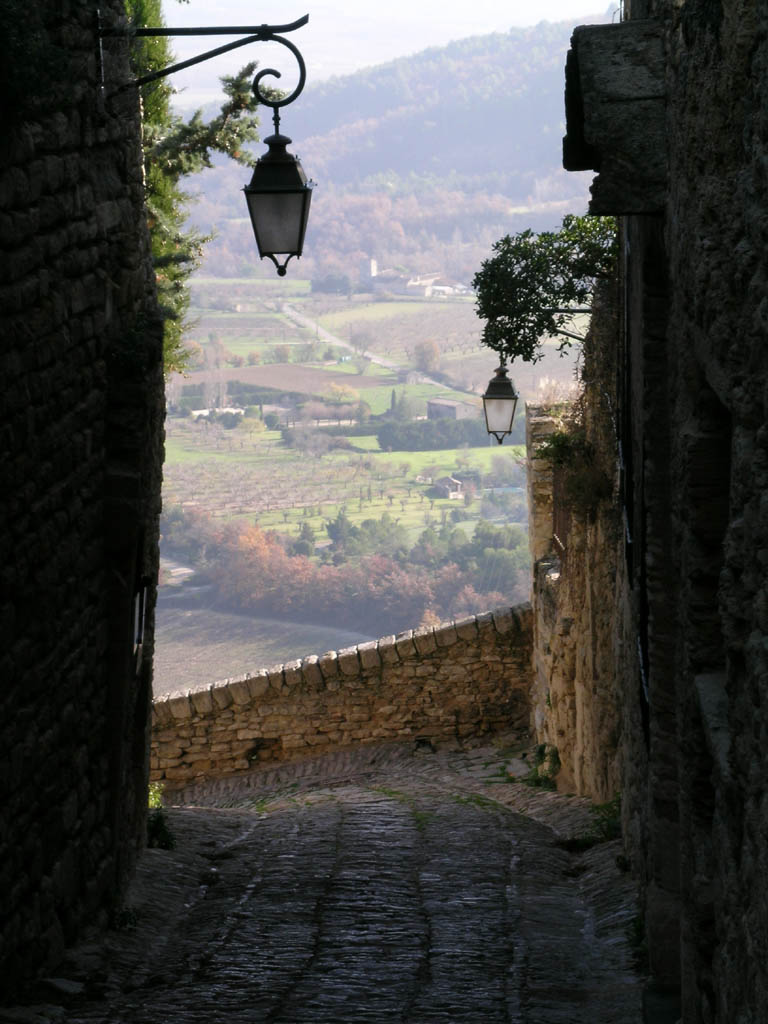
A calade in the village.

All new buildings in Gordes are made of stone with terracotta roof tiles. No fences are allowed, only stone walls. All electrical and telephone cables are underground, except in some pre-existing installations on the borders of the commune. Some streets inside the village are paved with stone and are called calades.

=== The hamlets ===
There are several ancient hamlets around the village, whose names are mostly based on the names of the local families (Gros, Imbert, Martin, Cortasse) or from the activities performed there (les bouillons, les bouilladoires).

The largest hamlet is les Imberts, in the valley 5 km to the southwest. Les Imberts church was built between 1785 and 1792; other buildings also have 18th century architectural details. Gordes' two football pitches are in Les Imberts: one for official matches and the other for training. Les Imberts has a nursery and a school and once had several small shops, but in 2011 it only had a petrol station.

Les Gros and les Martins are two former hamlets, which are close to each other, between les Imberts and the commune of les Beaumettes.

The hamlets of les Sauvestres, les Pourquiers, les Marres and les Cortasses are in the plain to the south-east of Gordes. Some of the buildings in these hamlets date back hundreds of years.

== Economy ==
=== Agriculture ===
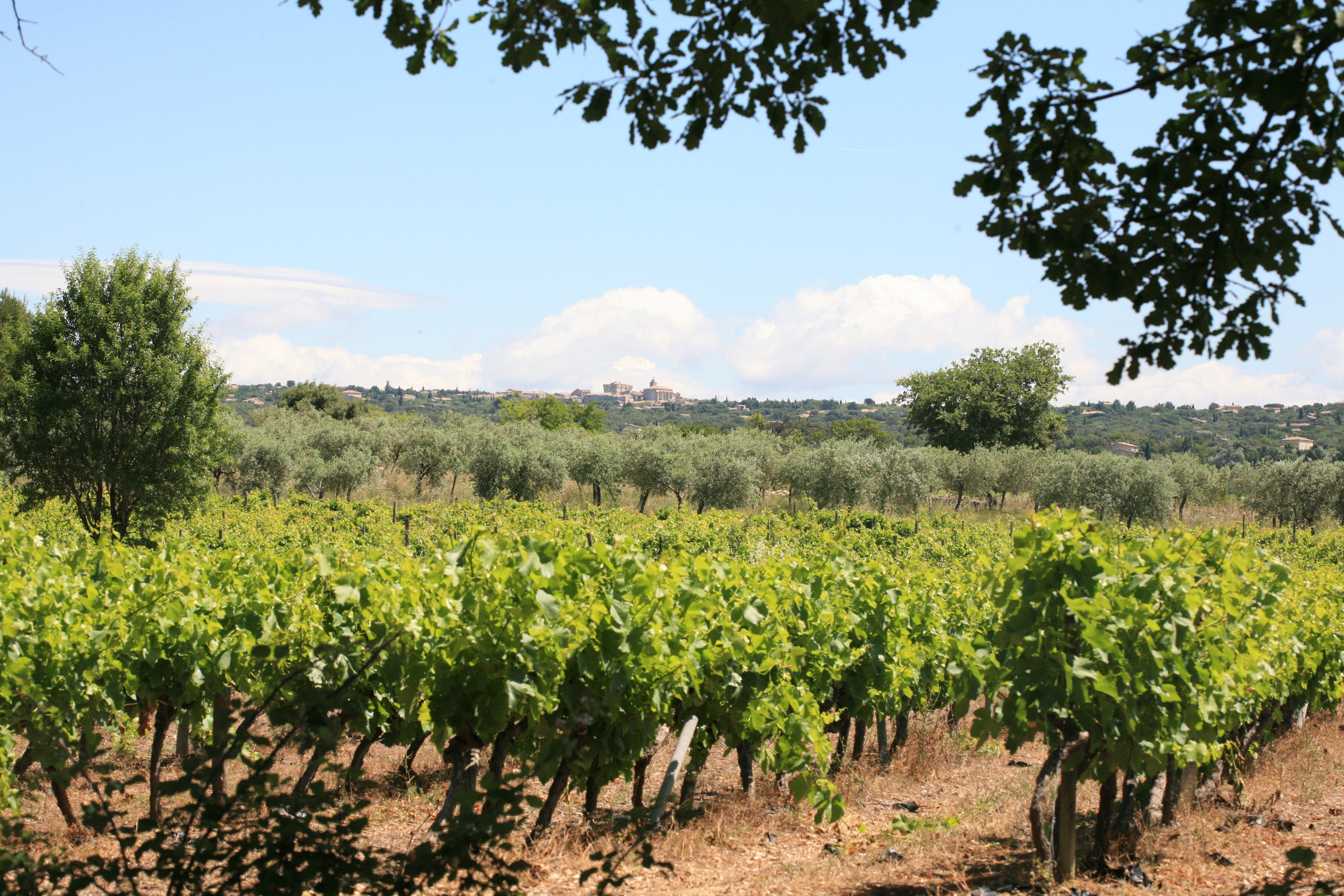
Vineyard and olive trees with the roofs of Gordes in the distance

As in many villages in the Vaucluse department, agriculture is important. Historically, almond trees were the most planted in the area, and though they are still present, olive trees have largely replaced them. Thus olive oil is important to local commerce. You can also find vineyards, with the production of table grapes or wine in AOC Ventoux.

=== Tourism ===
Tourism is a major part of the local economy of Gordes. Accommodating the tourist trade, there are a number of hotels, bed and breakfasts, seasonal rentals, and restaurants.

The main sights on the commune are the village itself, the castle, the Saint-Firmin Palace cellars, the Sénanque Abbey and the Village des Bories. In the surrounding towns, other tourist locations may be found, such as the Fontaine de Vaucluse, Roussillon or L'Isle-sur-la-Sorgue, the Luberon area, Avignon or the Mont Ventoux.

Gordes also has two centers of relaxation, numerous pools and ponds and miles of hiking trails.

=== Commercial activity and handcraft ===
Commercial activity is also important in the Gordes economy with various shops including several shops dedicated to tourists, selling souvenir and regional products (figurines, textiles, olive oil, honey, etc.). Moreover, a Provençal market is held every Tuesday morning around the castle.

Gordes also attracts artisans and traders in the real estate business like agents, architects, builders, landscapers, decorators and masons.

== Transport ==
The main access to the village of Gordes is via the departmental road D2 then the departmental road D15, coming from Cavaillon. It is from the latter road, below the Bel-Air rock, that the most famous and photographed point of view of the village can be seen.

Gordes is located 38 kilometres east of Avignon and its TGV station, 75 kilometres from Marseille Provence Airport and 87 kilometres from Marseille. The closest standard SNCF train stations are located in L'Isle-sur-la-Sorgue and Cavaillon.

== Facilities ==
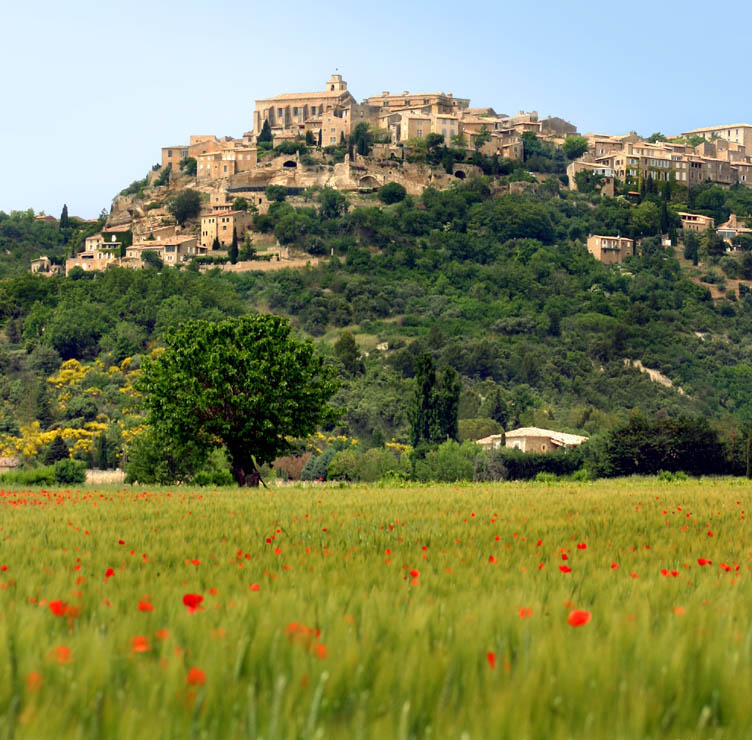
Gordes

Market day occurs in Gordes once a week. On Tuesday mornings, merchants from the area set up booths and sell their wares. These typically include food, clothing, instruments, Provençale dishes, decorations, and handicrafts. Additionally, the village has two bakeries and a variety of shops.

=== Education ===
The commune has a primary school, a nursery school and a day care centre.

=== Health ===
The village is home to several doctors, a pharmacy, a dentist and even a hospital but exclusively used for older people.

== Sport ==
The commune is equipped with various sporting facilities including two football/soccer fields, walking and cycling trails, pétanque and other recreational spaces.

== Notable people ==
Several important artists have lived or worked in Gordes, including André Lhote, Marc Chagall, Pierre Chapo, Philippe Ragueneau, Victor Vasarely, Victor Spahn, Walter Salles and Willy Ronis. President François Mitterrand had a holiday home in Gordes.

== Culture ==
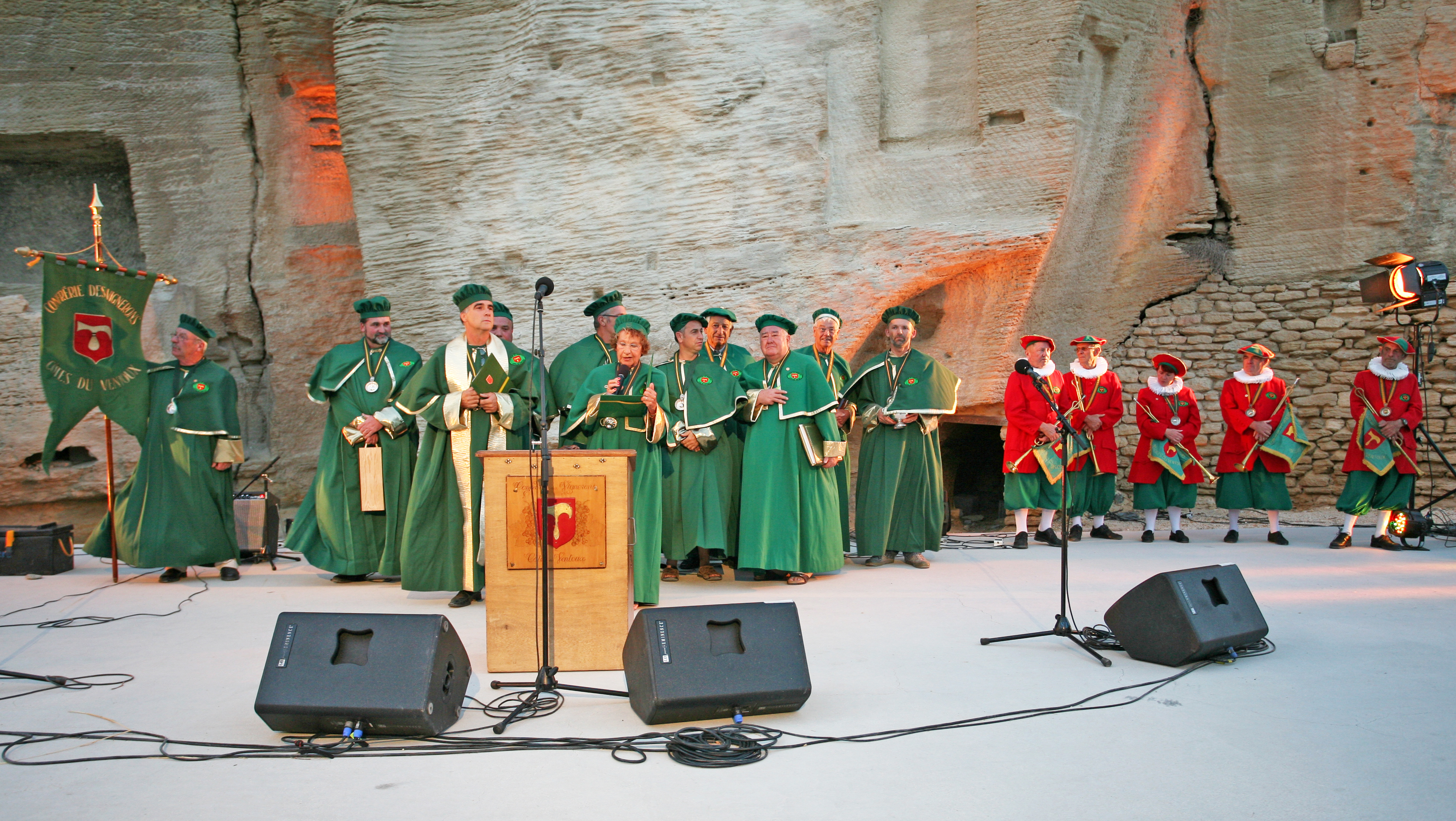

=== Fine arts and festivals ===
The village of Gordes has a few art galleries and festivals. The biggest festival of Gordes is a music festival, but there is also a wine festival.

The castle, stone houses, stone paved streets, views, etc. of Gordes have been an important source of inspiration for paintings or photography. for example, the Provençal Nude by Willy Ronis was made in the "fontaine basse" area of Gordes in 1949.

=== Literature ===
Gordes appears in several books including :

- La vénus de Gordes, Ernest Daudet (1875)
- Sa Majesté l'argent III, La Comtesse De Gordes, Xavier de Montépin, (1878)
- All the books about the adventure of the Chat Moune, Philippe Ragueneau (from 1981 to 1990)
- Les trois Joyaux de Gordes, Marc de Smedt (1988)
- A year in Provence, Peter Mayle (1993)
- Deliver Us From Evil, David Baldacci (2010)

A photograph of Gordes was used on the cover of the 2017 Gollancz edition of Orsinia, an edition combining Malafrena and Orsinian Tales by Ursula K. Le Guin.

=== Film and television ===
Gordes has served as the setting for several movies or series including :

- One Deadly Summer, Jean Becker (1983);
- Mistral's Daughter, Kevin Connor (1984);
- A Year in Provence, David Tucker (1993)
- Gazon maudit, Josiane Balasko (1995);
- 18 ans après, Coline Serreau (2003);
- A Good Year, Ridley Scott (2006);
- Mr. Bean's Holiday, Steve Bendelack (2006).

== See also ==
- Communes of the Vaucluse department
- Victor Vasarely

== Bibliography ==
- (in French) Jean-Louis Morand, GORDES notes d'histoire, mairie de Gordes
- (in French) Gérard Lebouchet, Aspects de la Vie à Gordes de la Révolution à l'Aube du XXe siècle, C'est-à-dire, 2007 (ISBN 2952756414)
- (in French) Guy Leduc, Gordes, acropole en Provence, Edelgé (ISBN 2-916188-00-2)
- (in English) Sylvain Gagniere, The Origin of the Region of Gordes, 1989
- (in French) Corinne et Alexis Lucchesi, Guide du Pays de Gordes, Equinoxe, 2003 (ISBN 2-84135-301-X)
- (in French) Jean-Louis Morand, Gordes & l'Abbaye de Sénanque. Le temps retrouvé, Equinoxe (ISBN 2-908209-11-X)
- (in French) Jacqueline Brotte, Gordes : Un rêve de pierre, Alain Barthelemy, 2006 (ISBN 2879232260)
