= Chapo =

Chapo ("Shorty") may refer to:

== Places ==
- Chapo Lake, in Chile

== People ==
=== Surnames ===
- Daniel Chapo (born 1977), Mozambican President
- Pierre Chapo (1927–1987), French furniture designer

=== Nicknames ===
- Chapo Rosario (1963–1997), Puerto Rican professional boxer
- Chapo Montes (born 1986), Mexican former professional footballer

== Arts, entertainment, and media ==
- Chapo Trap House, an American politics and humor podcast

== Other uses ==
- Chapo (beverage), a Peruvian drink
- Chapati, an Indian flatbread known as chapo in East Africa

== See also ==
- El Chapo (disambiguation)
- Charo (disambiguation)
