= Philippe Ragueneau =

French journalist and writer (1917–2003)

Philippe Ragueneau (19 November 1917 – 22 October 2003) was a French journalist and writer. He was born in Orléans (Loiret) and died in Gordes (Vaucluse). Ragueneau was a resistance and then military fighter during World War II, and friend of the General Charles de Gaulle. He is a graduate of HEC Paris.

After the war, Ragueneau became a journalist and a political ally of de Gaulle, joining his cabinet in 1958. In the 1970s, he was a television writer and producer.

== Distinctions ==
=== French ===
- Commandeur de la Légion d'honneur
- Compagnon de la Libération (17 November 1945)
- Croix de Guerre 1939-1945 (3 citations)
- Médaille de la Résistance
- Médaille Coloniale
- Croix du combattant volontaire 1939–1945
- Médaille Commémorative des Services Volontaires dans la France Libre

=== Foreign ===
- Africa Star (Great Britain)
- 1939-45 War Medal / mention in dispatches (Great Britain)
- Silver Star (United States)
