= Village des Bories =

Open-air museum in Vaucluse, France

Coordinates: 43°54′27″N 5°10′48″E

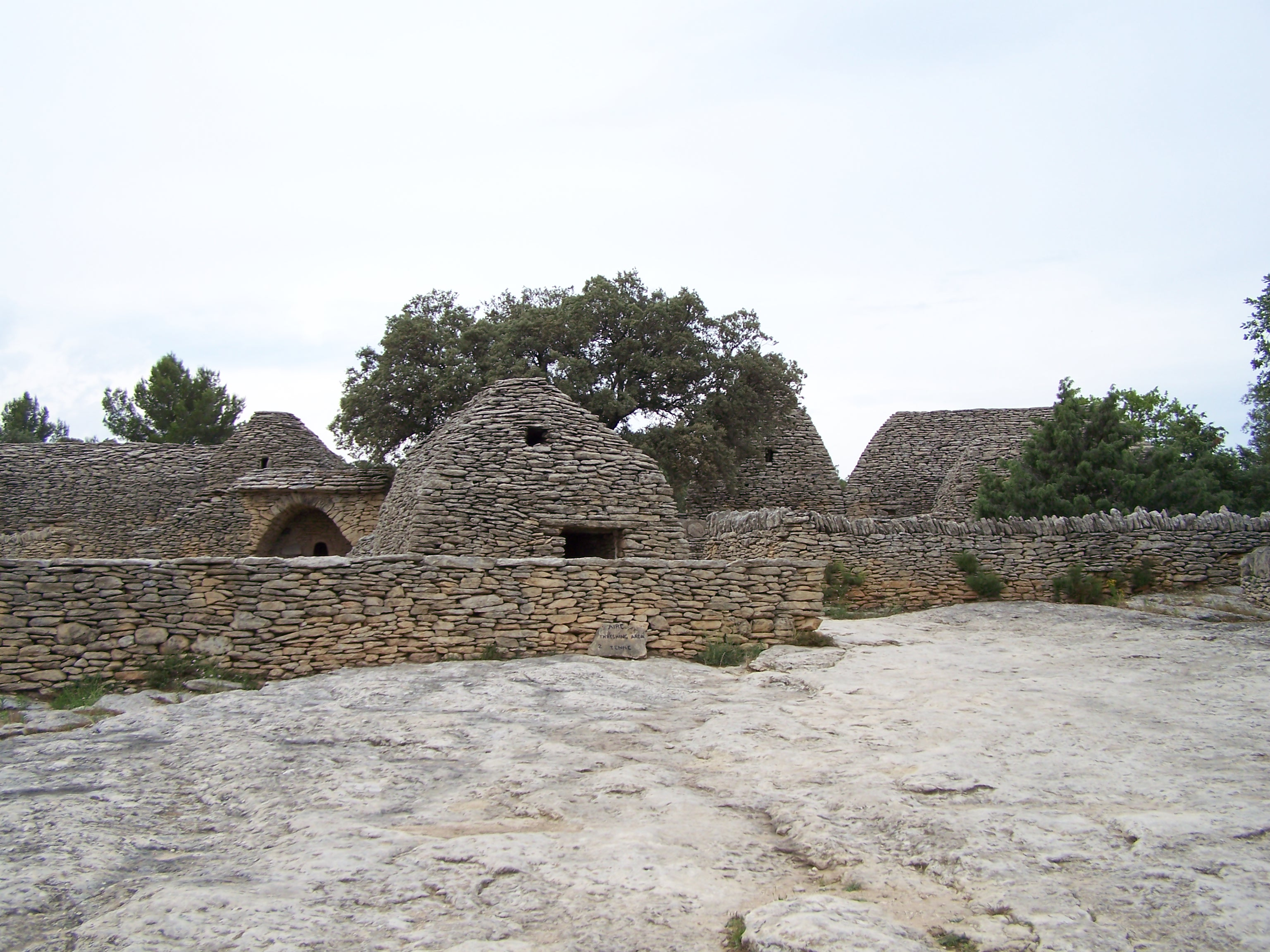
At a place known originally as “Les Savournins Bas” in Gordes, the open-air museum created by Pierre Viala in 1976 under the name of “Village des Bories”.

Village des Bories is an open-air museum of 20 or so dry stone huts located 1.5 km west of the Provençal village of Gordes, in the Vaucluse department of France. The area was once an outlying district of the village, under the official name of 'Les Savournins', while the grouping of huts was called 'Les Cabanes' in local parlance.

== Location ==
These huts, which were once agricultural outhouses used on a seasonal basis, stand on a hill at an average altitude of 270–275 metres, between the Sénancole stream – its border to the West – and the Gamache vale – its border to the East, in what the Gordes villagers call the “garrigue” (scrubland) or “montagne” (the hills).

== Designations ==
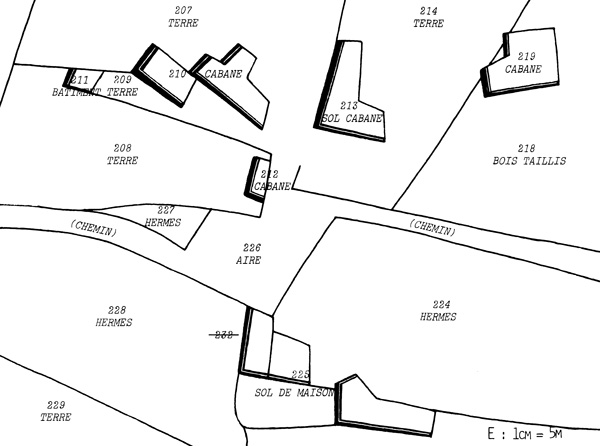
“Les Savournins Bas“ in the Napoleonic land register. Only the designations “cabane“, “sol de cabane“,“sol de maison“ are used, the word “borie“ is nowhere to be found. Although the buildings appear sketchily drawn, their outlines show that they were fewer than in the present-day configuration.

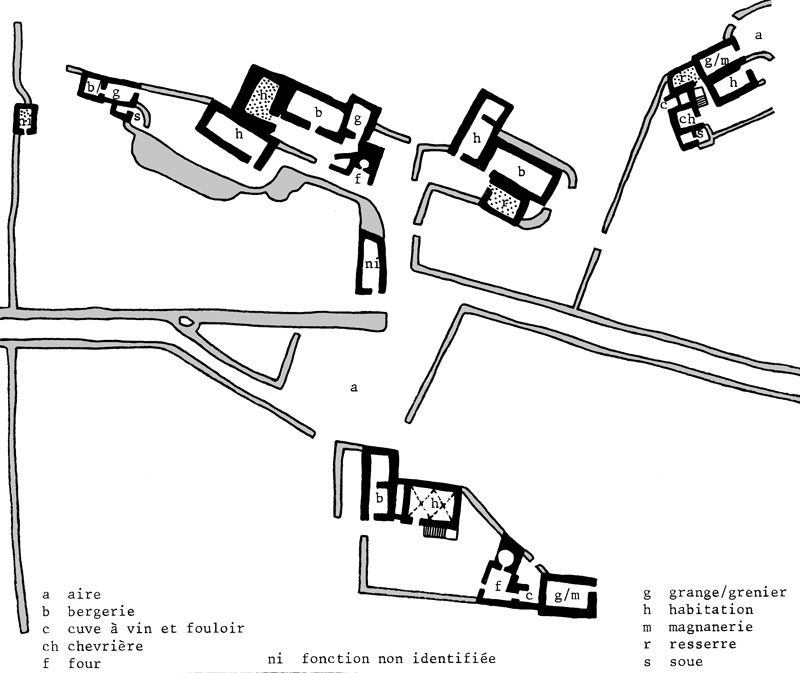
Pierre Viala’s “Village des Bories”. The edifices drawn in dotted lines are those that appear to be missing from the 1809 land register.

In the 1809 land map, the hamlet is referred to as “hameau des Savournins”, a designation which is abridged to “Les Savournins” in the 1956 land map. In local parlance, it was still called “Les cabanes” (the huts) in the late 1970s. Its modern, museological name was coined by Pierre Viala, the site’s discoverer, owner and restorer at the time.

The word “Borie” originates from an 18th-century place name – “Les Borrys”, in the Bouches-du-Rhône département – that was mistakenly construed as meaning “dry stone hut” by a mid 19th-century scholar. In the 1809 land register, the dry stone huts are referred to as “cabane” (when intact and still in use) and “sol de cabane” (when deserted and derelict) (see picture representing “Les Savournins Bas“ in the Napoleonic land register).

== History ==
The emergence of the outlying hamlet of “Les Savournins” dates back to a wide scale campaign of land clearing and cultivation that took place in 18th-century Provence, following a 1766 royal edict. The rush to the hills resulted in masses of stones being extracted from the ground to make way for new fields complete with dry stone walls and huts.

The potsherds found in the huts and fields during the restoration work of the 1970s are characteristic of the earthenware manufactured in the Apt, Vaucluse, region in the 18th-19th centuries.

== Building material ==
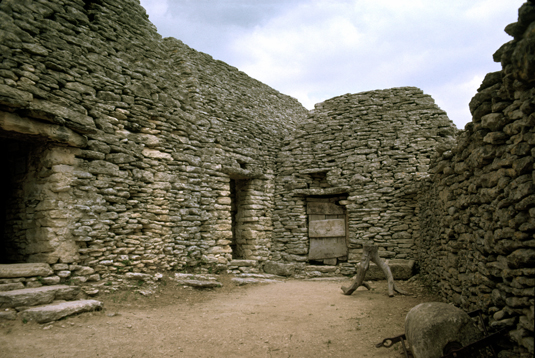
Group of buildings No 4 as per Pierre Viala’s classification, with, from left to right, a dwelling with silkworm-breeding facility, a sheep shelter-cum-byre, and a store house.

The huts were built using locally extracted, 10 to 15 cm-thick, limestone slabs, going by the name of “lauses” or “clapes”.

== Structure and form ==
Out of the 28 stone buildings still extant on the site,

- 20 belong to the so-called “Gordoise nave”, i.e. a rectangular or trapezoid edifice in the form of an upturned keel, either free standing or abutting on another edifice,
- 3 have a rectangular or square plan, with a corbelled vault in the form of a cupola or a half dome,
- 2 have a semi-circular vault of voussoirs as well as a cupola-shaped vault of voussoirs (the two oven houses with their ovens),
- 2 have a circular or horse-shoe-shaped plan (ruined buildings),
- 1 is a conventional first-floor house under a one-sided roof of canal tiles.

The prevalence of the “Gordoise nave”, together with the use of mortarless masonry, lends the hamlet a certain architectural unity. .

== The “Gordoise Nave” ==
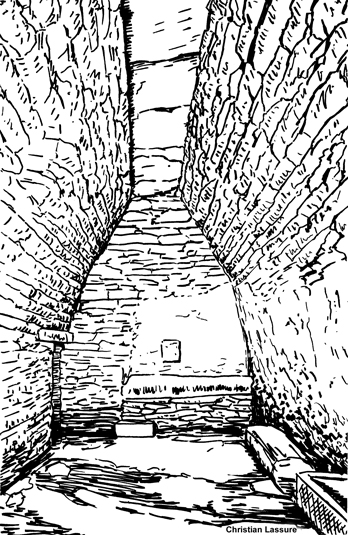
Interior of the sheep shelter-cum-byre of Group No 4.

Functionally, the “Gordoise nave” appears to have been a multi-purpose edifice used as seasonal dwelling, barn, grain store house, byre, sheep shelter, silkworm house, tool shed, treading house with vat.

== The buildings’ layout and functions ==
The “Village des Bories” comprises several “groups” of “cabanes” which are distributed across the areas North and South of a lane that runs through the site. A “group” is to be seen as a reunion of two or more edifices, either abutting against, or adjoining, one another, or in proximity, usually round a small yard. It would be wrong, however, to think that each group belonged to a single family. A study of the Napoleonic and modern land registers has shown that some groups did belong to two separate owners or that the same person could own one building in a group and another building in another group.

The site also contains two threshing yards but no wells or water storage tanks (the nearest well, 100 metres away from the centre of the grouping, is dry).

== Witnesses to Provençal agricultural history ==
Based on an analysis of the buildings’ functions, the evidence provided by both land registers, the testimonies of Gordes villagers, and vestigial tree stumps, cereals (wheat, rye) were grown in the area in the 19th century, along with olive, almond and mulberry trees (the latter for silkworm rearing) and vines. There was also a cottage industry of leather sole making.

Also, some stone huts may have belonged to people living in a nearby village other than Gordes, a pattern that was not uncommon in the Provence of old.

The site was listed as a historic monument in 1977 and has been open to visitors for a fee ever since. Its current owner and manager is the Gordes municipality.

== Gallery ==
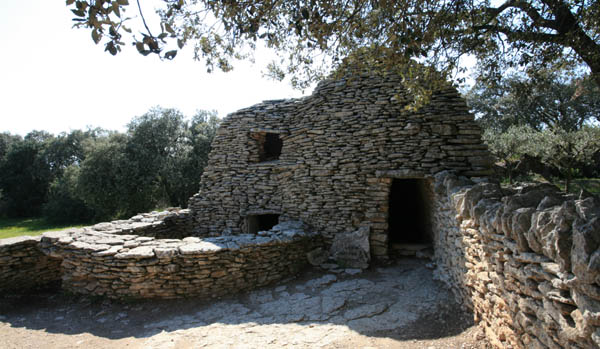
Western sub-grouping in Pierre Viala’s group No 2

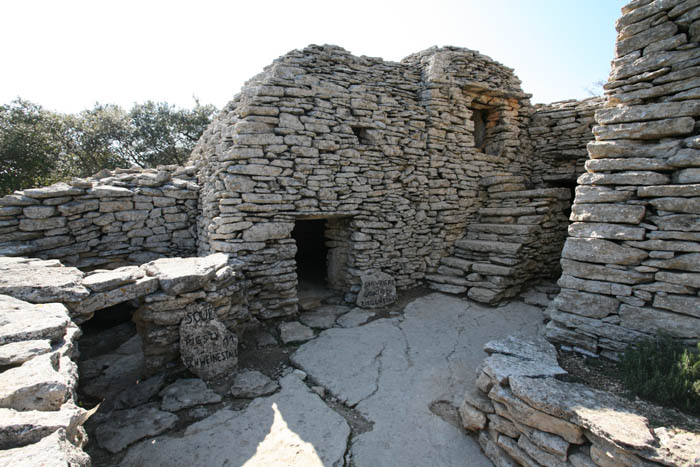
Group No 5 (as per Viala)

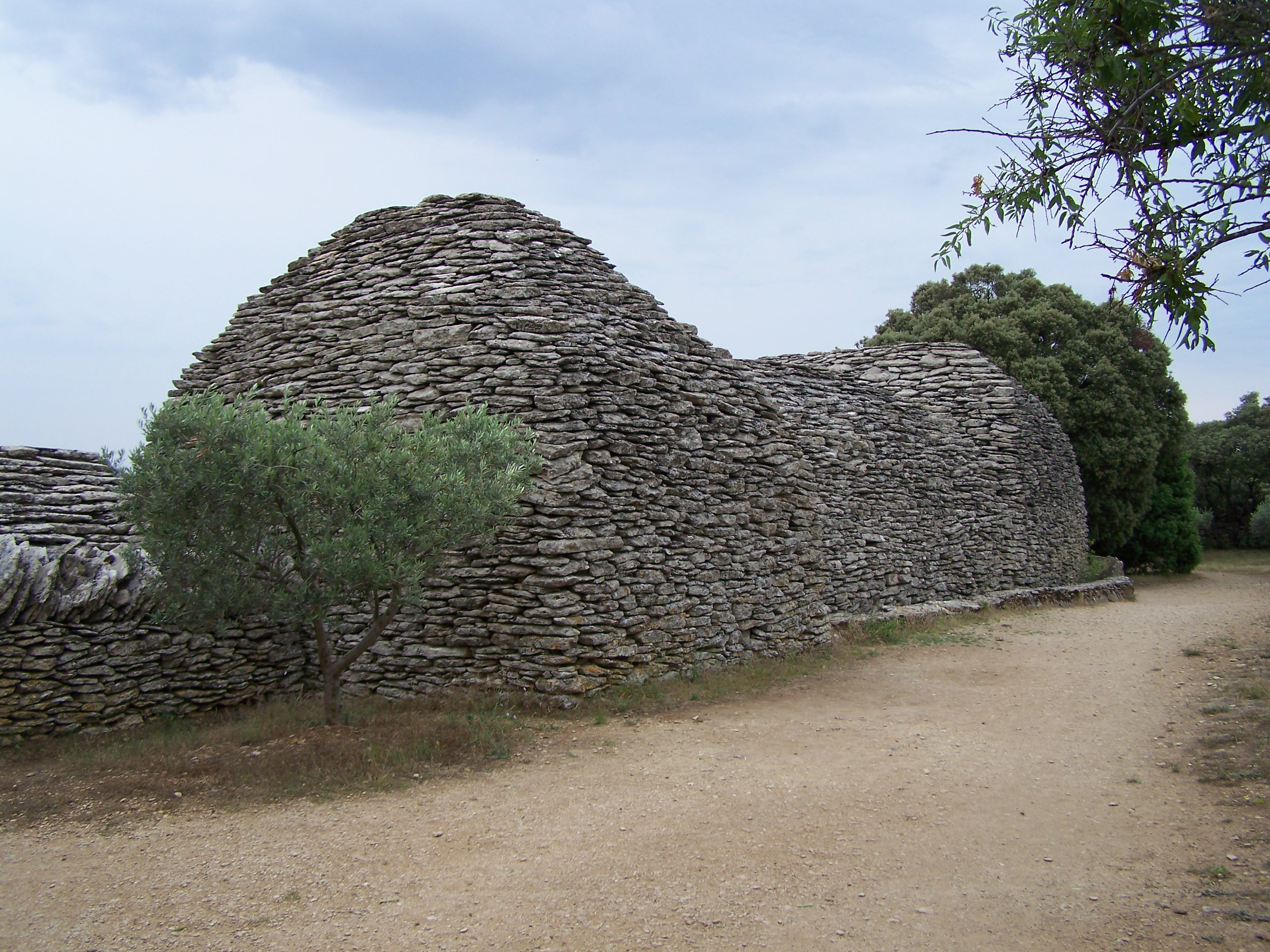
Group No 3 (as per Viala) (from right to left: dwelling, sheep shelter, barn-cum-granary)

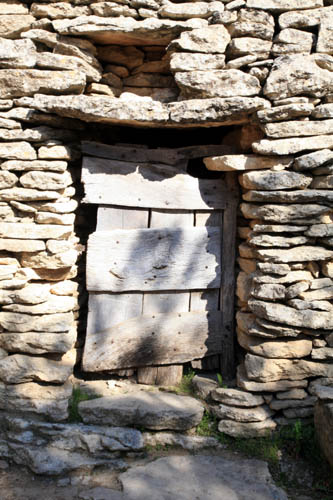
Entrance of the store room of Group No 4 (as per Viala)

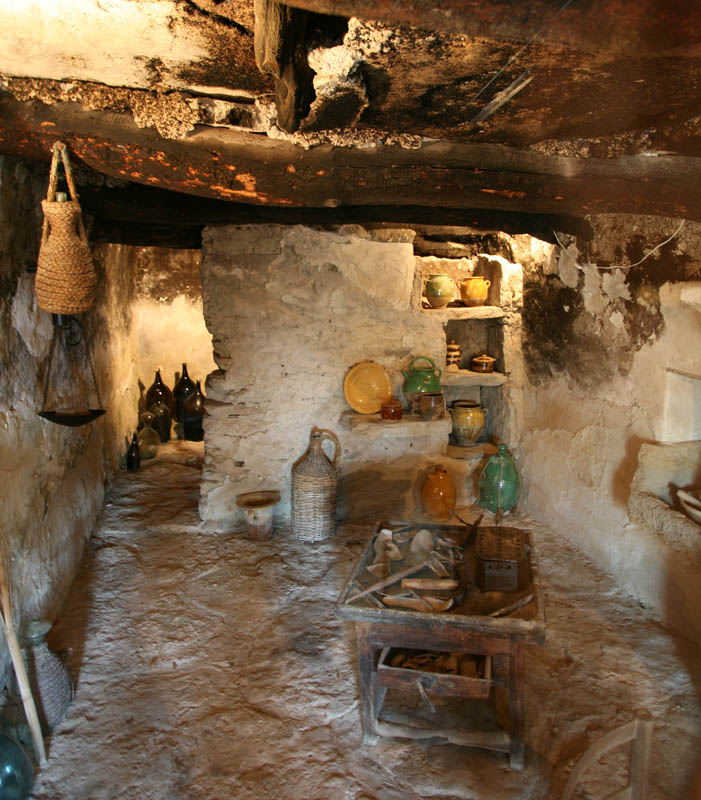
Inside of the dwelling (now occupied by exhibits) of Group No 4 (as per Viala)

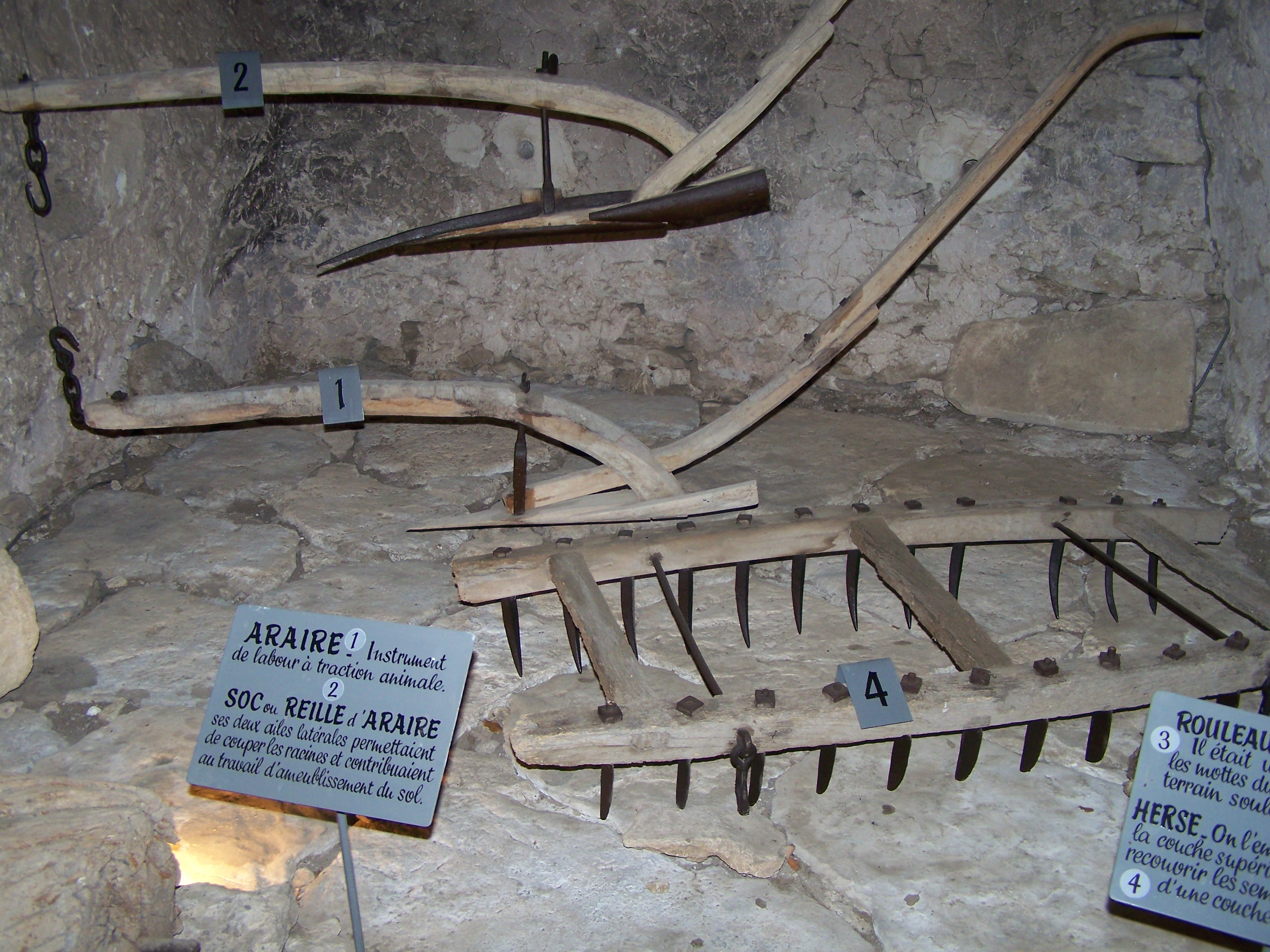
Some of the exhibits: light swing-ploughs (or ards) and a harrow

== Bibliography ==
- Pierre Viala, Le village des bories à Gordes dans le Vaucluse, Ed. Le village des bories, Gordes, 1976.
- Christian Lassure, Problèmes d'identification et de datation d'un hameau en pierre sèche : le "village des bories" à Gordes (Vaucluse). Premiers résultats d'enquête, in L'architecture rurale', t. 3, 1979.
- Christian Lassure, « Les Cabanes » à Gordes (Vaucluse) : architecture et édification, in L'architecture vernaculaire rurale, supplément No 2, 1980.

== See also ==
- Cabanes du Breuil
