= Bonneval Abbey (Aveyron) =

Abbey in Aveyron, France

Coordinates: 44.5620°N 2.7936°E

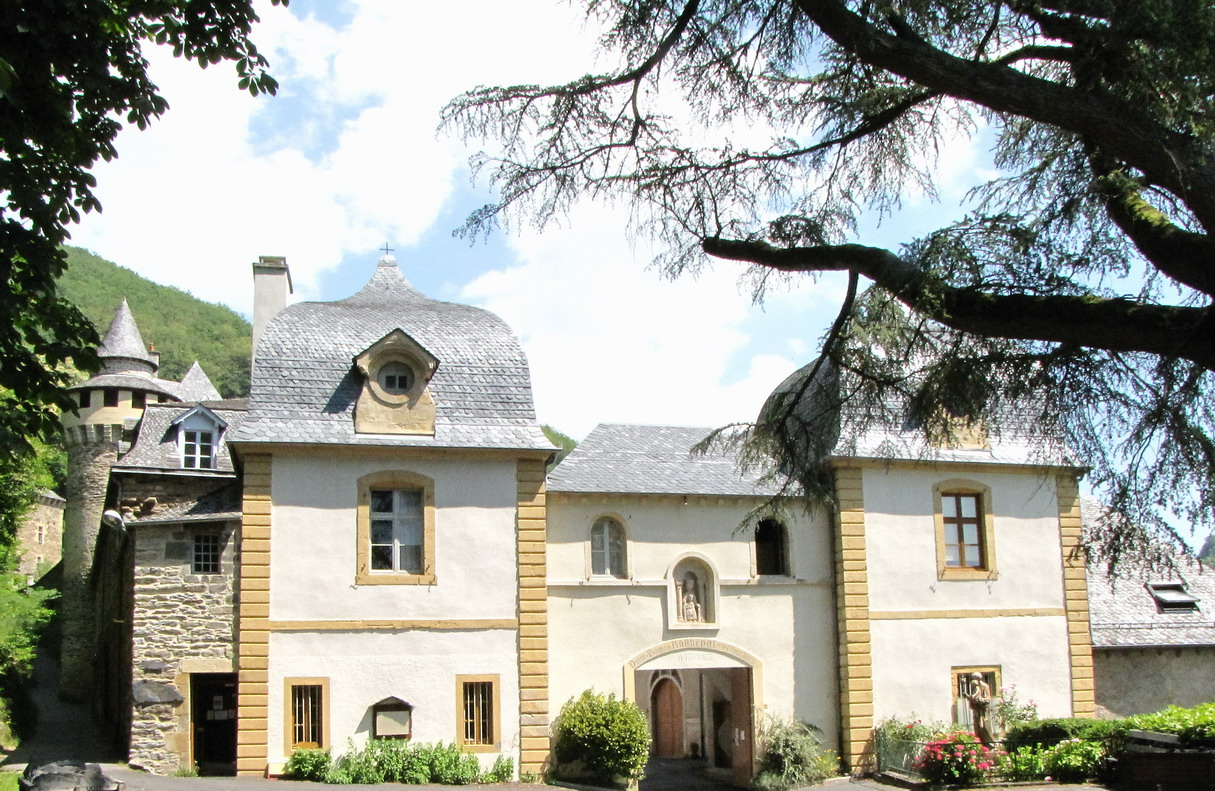
The entrance to the abbey.

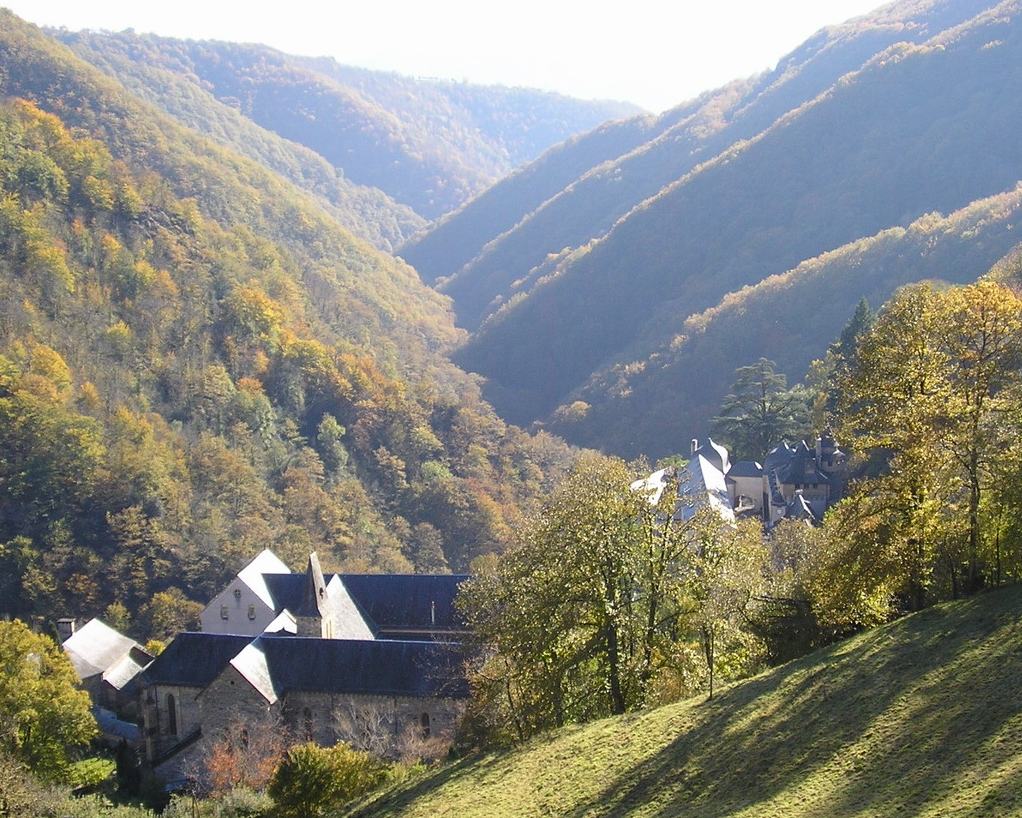
The abbey in its valley.

Bonneval Abbey (French: Abbaye de Bonneval) was founded as a monastery of Cistercian monks in Le Cayrol, in the department of Aveyron, in the south of France. It is now inhabited by Trappistine nuns.

== History ==
Bonneval Abbey was founded in 1147 by Cistercian monks from Mazan Abbey, in Rouergue. Its name means "good valley", a typical Cistercian name. Bonneval quickly became a rich and powerful abbey, owning extensive estates throughout the country.

In the mid-14th century it suffered from the Black Death and underwent much damage and loss during the Hundred Years' War, as the Rouergue was given to the English in 1360 by the Treaty of Brétigny. Towns and abbeys were looted, and Bonneval, although fortified, was unable to keep out the English troops and the bands of marauding French bandits.

A long period of decadence followed. Nevertheless, Bonneval was chosen in the 17th century to educate novices from every Cistercian abbey in southwest France. During the French Revolution, in 1791, the 13 remaining monks had to leave. The abbey and its goods were sold off, and the buildings subsequently quarried for stone.

== Today ==
In 1875, Trappist nuns came to rebuild the abbey. They also opened a chocolate factory, and installed a turbine on the river to produce electricity. In 1902, they founded what is now known as Bon-Conseil Abbey, (Note: Bon Conseil means "Good Counsel") in Quebec, Canada. (Note: founded in 1902 at Saint-Romuald; in 2001, moved to Saint-Benoît-Labre; both in Quebec, Canada)

Today, the community at Bonneval consists of 30 nuns, aged from 29 to 98. They still produce a prominent chocolate, but primarily they endeavour to fulfill their vocation of prayer.

== Sources/ External links ==
- Bonneval Abbey website (in French)
- Cistercian Order of the Strict Observance official website (Trappists)
