= El Chapo (disambiguation) =

El Chapo (Joaquín Guzmán, born 1957) is a Mexican former drug lord who headed the Sinaloa Cartel.

El Chapo ("Shorty") may also refer to:

== People ==
- El Chapo de Sinaloa (active 1995–present), Mexican singer
- Fausto Isidro Meza Flores ("El Chapo Isidro", born 1982), Mexican drug lord and high-ranking leader of the Beltrán Leyva Cartel
- El Chapo Montes (born 1986), Mexican association football player
- Edwin Rosario ("El Chapo", 1963–97), Puerto Rican boxer

== Entertainment ==
- "El Chapo" (song), by The Game and Skrillex
- El Chapo (TV series), a TV series about the life of Joaquín Guzmán

== See also ==
- El Chopo or Tianguis Cultural del Chopo, Saturday flea market near Mexico City downtown
- Chapo (disambiguation)
