= Sénanque Abbey =

Abbey in Vaucluse, France

Coordinates: 43°55′42″N 5°11′13″E

Abbey with lavender fields

Sénanque Abbey (Occitan: abadiá de Senhanca, French: Abbaye Notre-Dame de Sénanque) is a Cistercian abbey near the village of Gordes in the département of the Vaucluse in Provence, France.

== First foundation ==
It was founded in 1148 under the patronage of Alfant, bishop of Cavaillon, and Ramon Berenguer II, Count of Barcelona, Count of Provence, by Cistercian monks who came from Mazan Abbey in the Ardèche. Temporary huts housed the first community of impoverished monks. By 1152 the community already had so many members that Sénanque was able to found Chambons Abbey, in the diocese of Viviers.

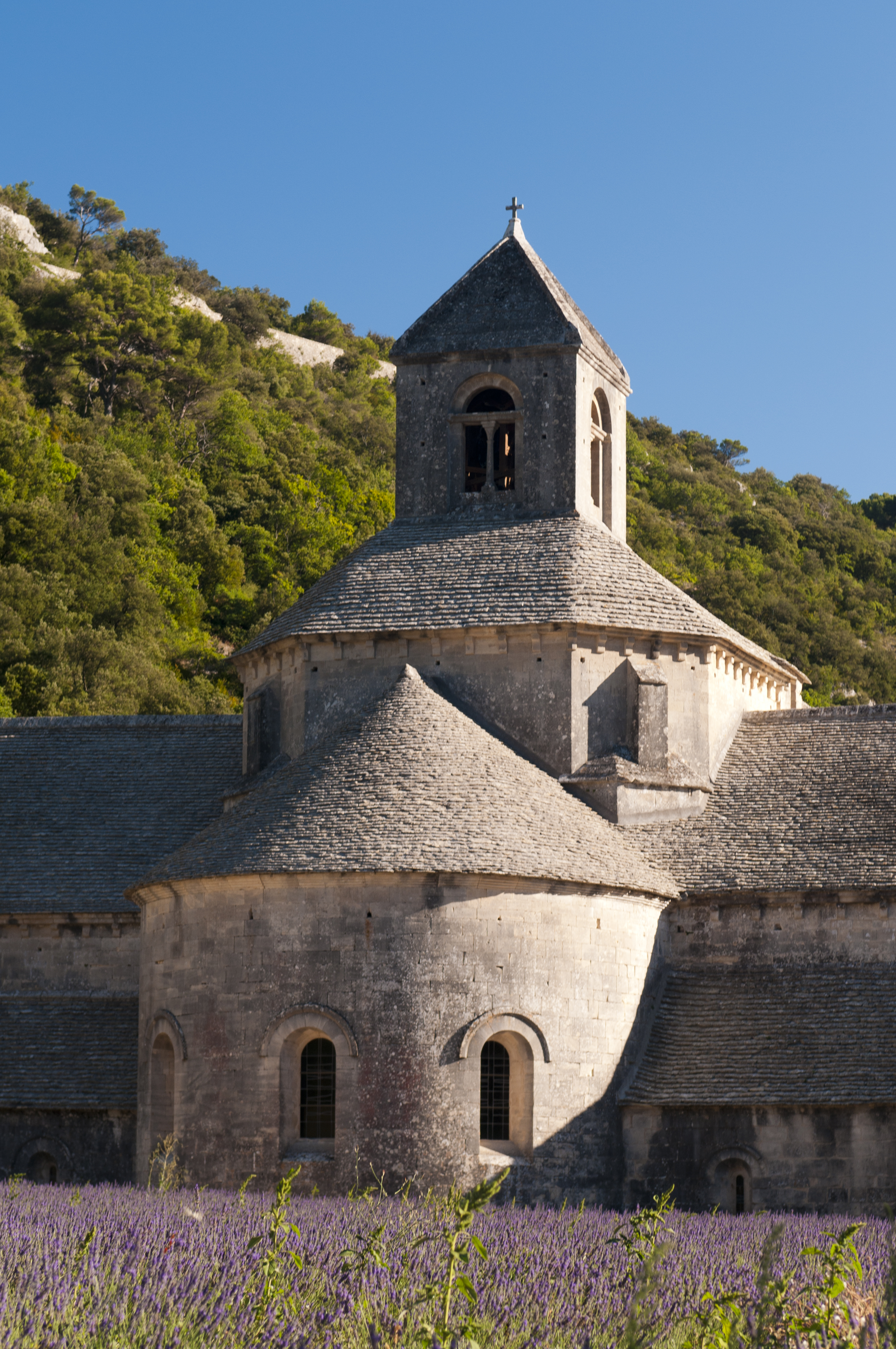
Apse of the abbey church

The young community found patrons in the seigneurs of Simiane, whose support enabled them to build the abbey church, consecrated in 1178. Other structures at Sénanque followed, laid out according to the rule of Cîteaux Abbey, mother house of the Cistercians. Among its existing structures, famed examples of Romanesque architecture, are the abbey church, cloister, dormitory, chapter house and the small calefactory, the one heated space in the austere surroundings, so that the monks could write, for this was their scriptorium. A refectory was added in the 17th century, when some minimal rebuilding of existing walls was undertaken, but the abbey is a remarkably untouched survival, of rare beauty and severity: the capitals of the paired columns in the cloister arcades are reduced to the simplest leaf forms, not to offer sensual distraction.

The abbey church is in the form of a tau cross with an apse projecting beyond the abbey's outer walls. Somewhat unusually, its liturgical east end faces north, as the narrow and secluded valley offered no space for the conventional arrangement.

In the 13th and 14th centuries, Sénanque reached its apogee, operating four mills, seven granges and possessing large estates in Provence. In 1509, when the first abbot in commendam was named, a sure sign of the decline of vocation, the community at Sénanque had shrunk to about a dozen. During the Wars of Religion the quarters for the lay brothers were destroyed and the abbey was ransacked by Huguenots. At the French Revolution the abbey's lands were nationalised, the one remaining monk was expelled and Sénanque itself was sold to a private individual.

== Second foundation ==
The site was repurchased in 1854 for a new community of Cistercian monks of the Immaculate Conception, under a rule less stringent than that of the Trappists. The community was expelled in 1903 and departed to the Order's headquarters, Lérins Abbey on the island of St. Honorat, near Cannes. A small community returned in 1988 as a priory of Lérins.

The monks who live at Sénanque grow lavender (visible in front of the abbey, illustration, right) and tend honey bees for their livelihood.

It is possible for individuals to arrange to stay at the abbey for spiritual retreat.

Two other early Cistercian abbeys in Provence are Silvacane Abbey and Le Thoronet Abbey; with Sénanque, they are sometimes referred to as the "Three Sisters of Provence" ("les trois soeurs provençales").

== Gallery ==
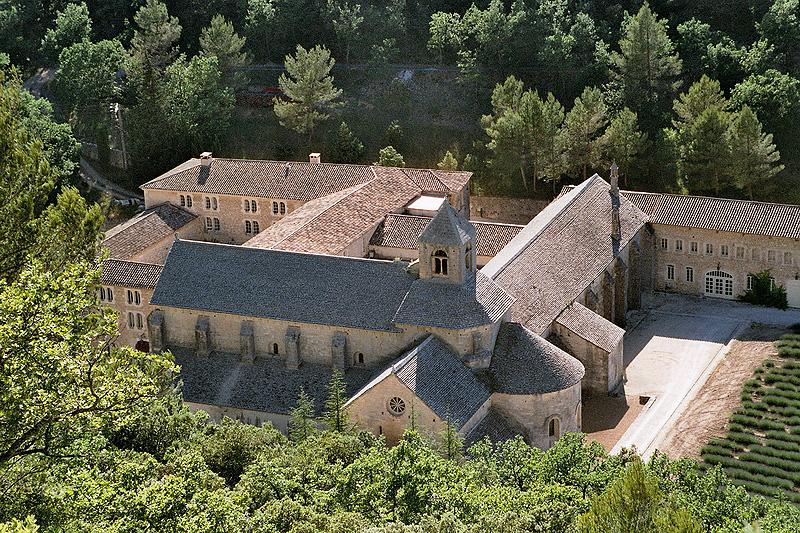
Global view on the site of Sénanque Abbey

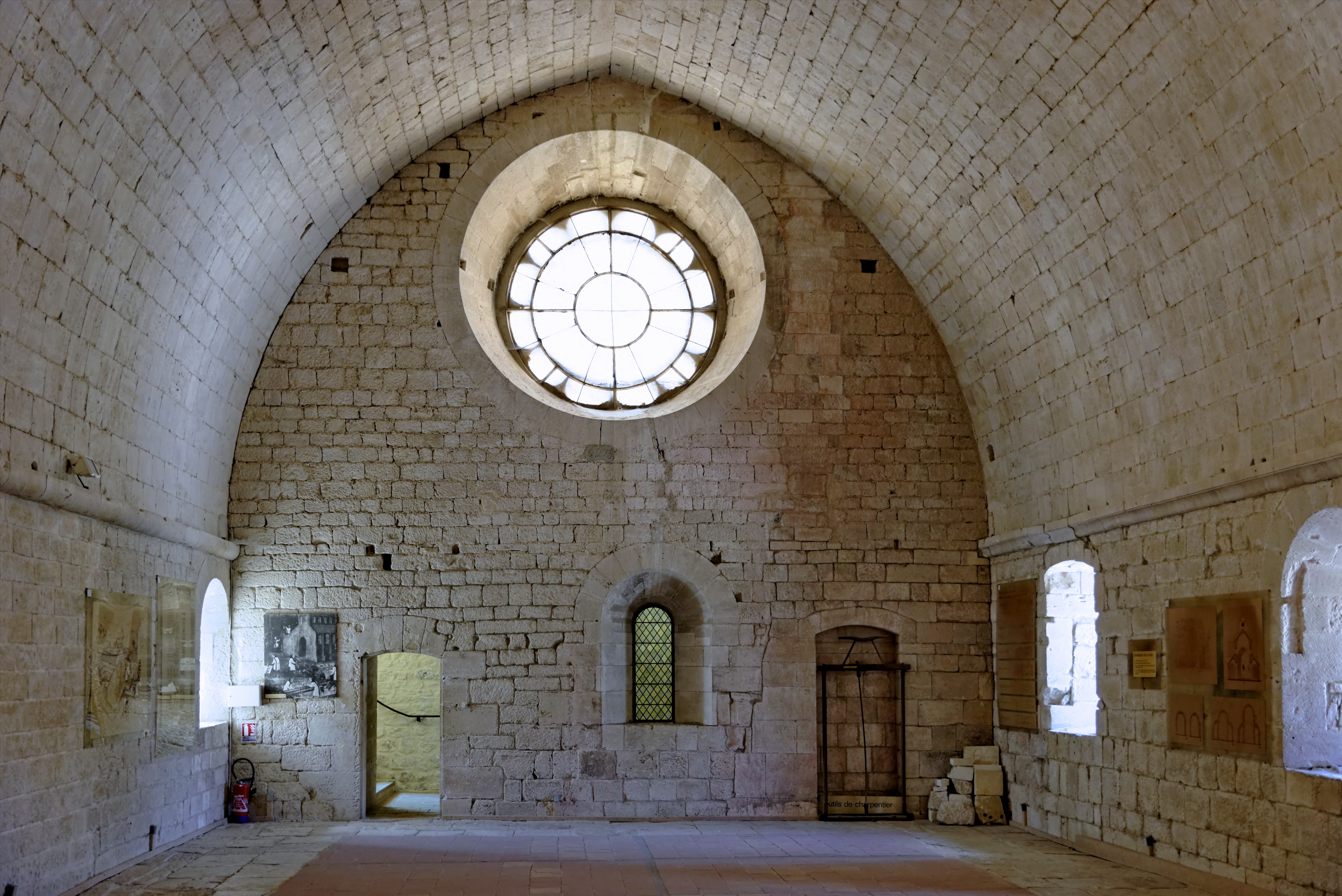
The dormitory of the monks.

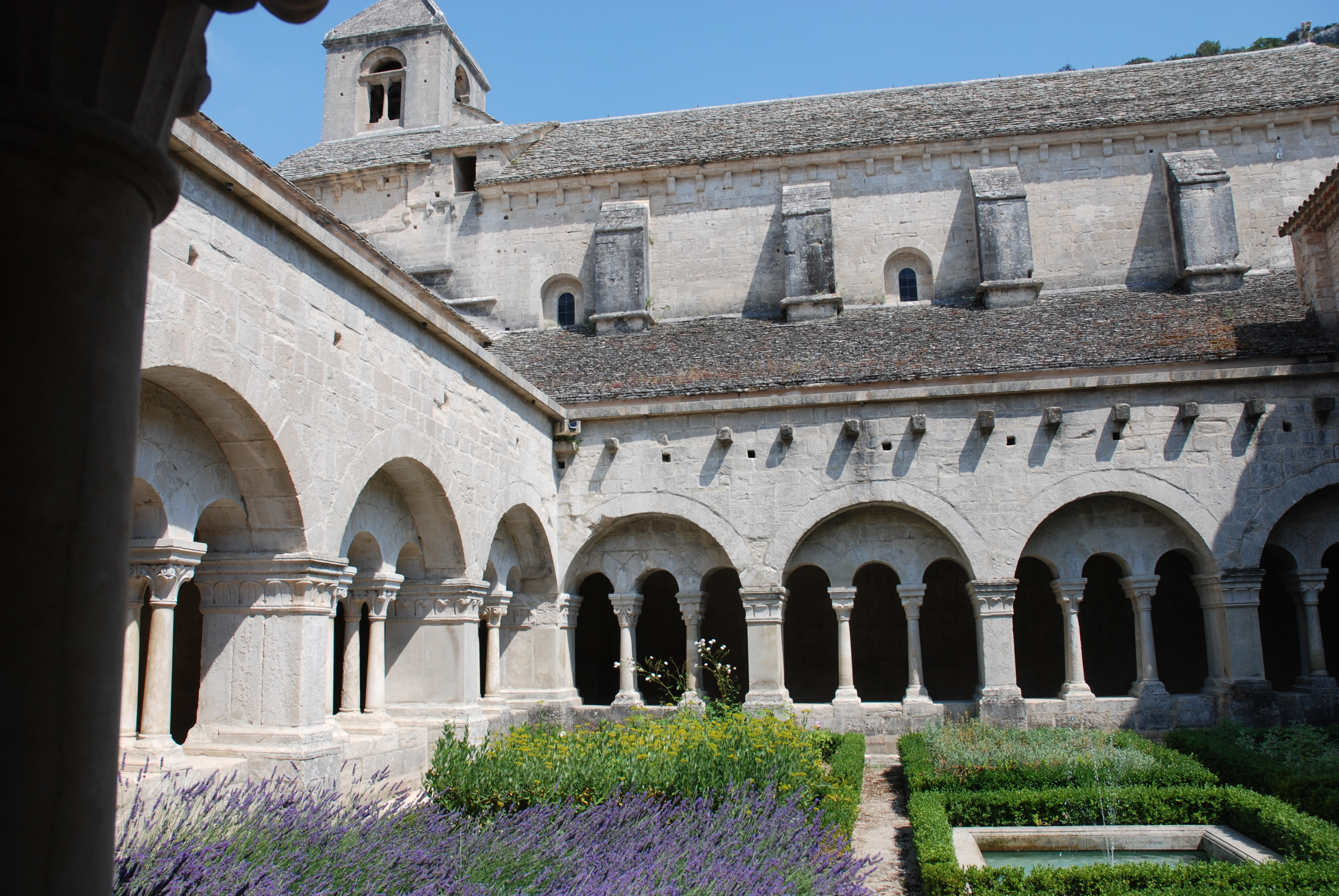
The inner cloister of the abbey.

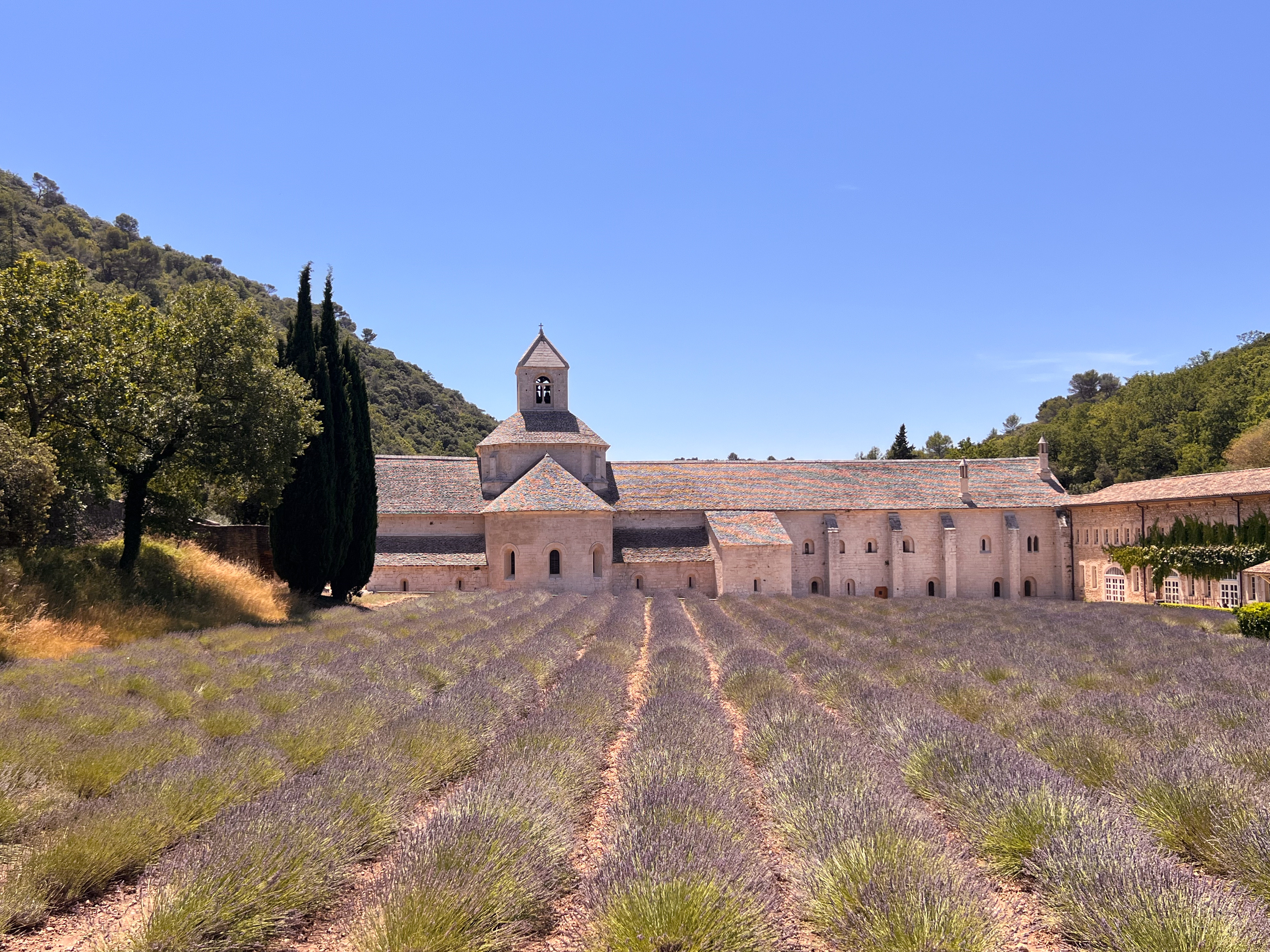
Abbaye Notre-Dame de Sénanque, 2026
