= Ciro Denza =

Italian painter (1844–1915)

Ciro Denza (Castellammare di Stabia, near Naples February 8, 1844 - 1915) was an Italian painter.

He was not formally trained in a formal Academy. He painted land- and sea-scapes of his native land. He exhibited often in Naples. In 1879, he exhibited in Turin, and from 1879 to 1884 in Florence and Rome.
