= Mazan Abbey =

Abbey in Ardèche, France

Coordinates: 44°43′45″N 4°05′23″E

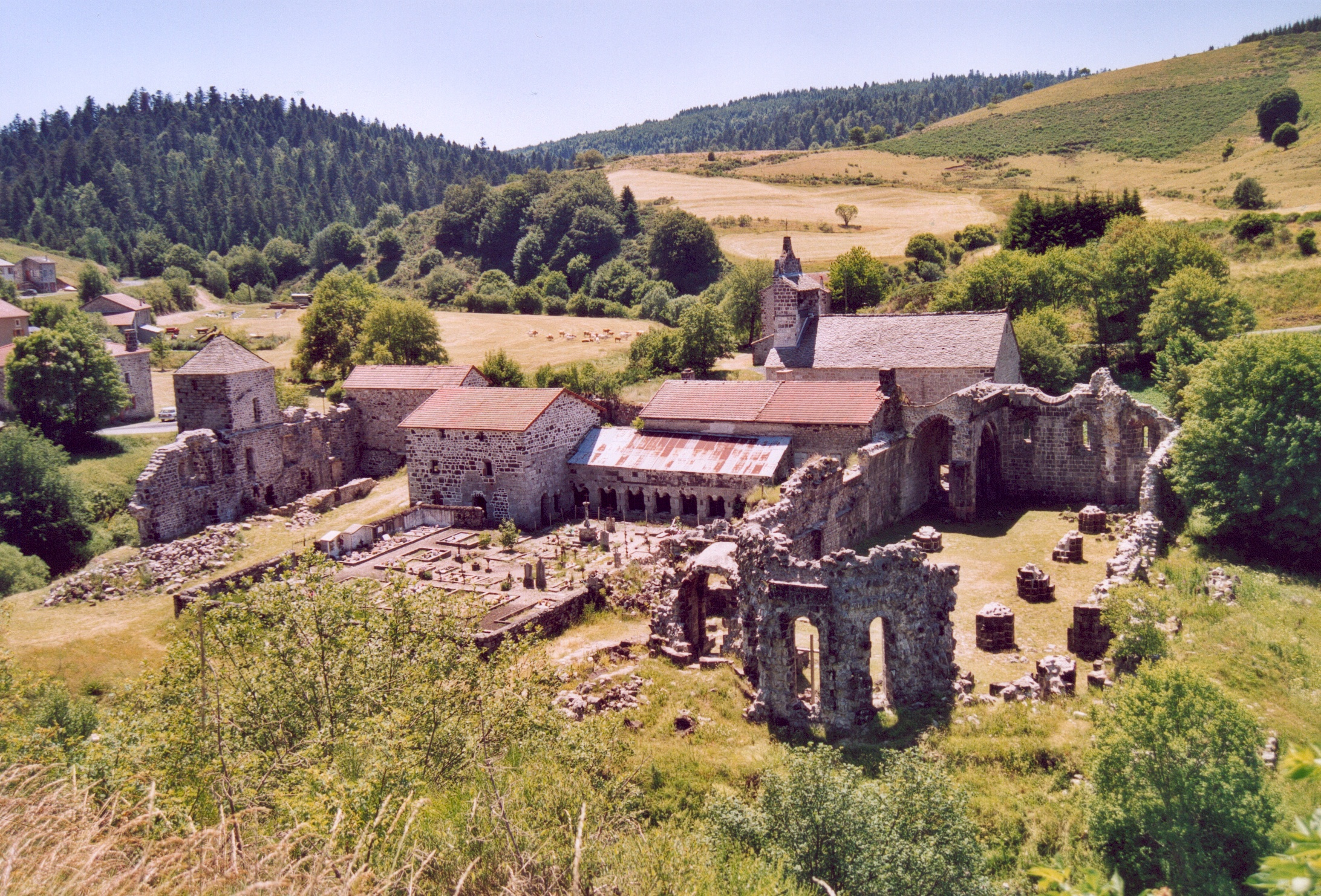
Mazan Abbey ruins

Mazan Abbey was a Cistercian monastery in the village of Mazan-l'Abbaye in the département of the Ardèche in the region of Rhône-Alpes, France.

It was founded in 1120 from Bonnevaux Abbey, incorporating an already existing community of canons, and was the mother house of Le Thoronet Abbey (1136), Silvanès Abbey (1136), Bonneval Abbey (1147) and Sénanque Abbey (1148). It was plundered during the Hundred Years' War and again by the Huguenots, and revived and rebuilt in the 18th century.

It was suppressed in the French Revolution, and the remains were systematically quarried for stone during the 19th and 20th centuries, especially to build the smaller modern church now adjacent to the site, as the original abbey church, which had been saved from destruction for the use of the parish, was considered too big and cold.

== Sources/External links ==
- Website of Mazan-l'Abbaye: history (in French)
- Volcans-Ardeche.com: photos of Mazan Abbey ruins (in French)
- Cister.net: Mazan Abbey
