= Ciro Annunchiarico =

Italian cult leader

Ciro Annunchiarico (in Italian: Ciro Annicchiarico) (also known as: Papa Ciro) (16 December 1775 in Grottaglie – 8 February 1817 in Francavilla Fontana) was an Italian cult leader.

== Early life ==
He was the son of wealthy parents. He entered the priesthood at a young age and seemed destined for the priesthood.

== Murder of Giovanni Montolesi ==
He seduced a young woman who was engaged to Giovanni Montolesi, the son of a wealthy merchant. When Montolesi learned of the affair, he sought out Annunchiarico and reproached him for bringing shame to the priesthood and dishonour to his fiancée. Without a word, Annunchiarico drew a dagger from his belt and stabbed Montolesi in the heart. He later swore a blood feud against the entire Montolesi family, declaring that the man whom he had murdered had insulted him and the entire Roman Catholic priesthood. Over the next few months, he ambushed and murdered thirteen members of the Montolesi clan. Pursued by the authorities, he then fled with some friends into the mountains.

== Gang leader ==
After thirteen years on the run he organized, in late 1816 and 1817, a confederation of robbers with a strength of 20,000 people. The name they used for themselves was Decisi, The Decided Ones of Jupiter the Thunderer. Their leader Ciro Annunchiarico claimed to be the earthly avatar of the ancient Roman god Jupiter. The area they laid claim to they called the Salentinian Republic.

== Charisma ==
He seemed to have had an extraordinary if not mysterious power of charisma, as tens of thousands of hardened bandits readily obeyed him and acknowledged his bizarre claims.

== Further murders ==
He is supposed to have killed between sixty and seventy men by his own hand.

== Execution ==
On 27 February 1818, his last stronghold, between Tarent and Brindisi, was stormed by a force of German and Swiss mercenaries under the command of an Englishman, General Richard Church.

He was later executed, together with 162 others, by a firing squad.
