= Ciro Mancuso =

American drug trafficker

Ciro Wayne Mancuso (born 1949) was a Nevada-based drug dealer convicted of running a $140-million marijuana smuggling operation for more than a decade. In cooperation with a foreign exchange student from Thailand, Mancuso built one of the largest domestic drug cartels in U.S. history.

The son of immigrants from Italy, Mancuso was a real estate developer before venturing into the lucrative narcotics business. His smuggling operation began in the late 1960s, when he teamed up with a group of college friends from Tahoe Paradise College. At first, they only sold marijuana at their college, but soon the business grew and they became involved with the Italian-American Mafia. When authorities moved in on their growing operation at a small farm in Clay County, Kansas, they began importing marijuana from Mexico. Later Mancuso teamed up with a Thai exchange student to import more potent marijuana into San Francisco. Mancuso soon realized that there was more profit to be made selling cocaine and integrated it into his marijuana operation.

It took the government twelve years to build a case against Mancuso. Anthony White, assistant U.S. Attorney for the District of Nevada, brought charges against Mancuso in 1990 and it was hailed as one of the largest drug conspiracy cases in state history. The indictment alleged that Mancuso used a multi-state cocaine and marijuana smuggling operation to buy ranches, mountaintop retreats, beach-front estates and anything else he might want.

Mancuso was sentenced to nine years in prison on June 27, 1995. His sentence was greatly reduced because of his cooperation with the government in cases against other alleged organization members and Mancuso's lawyer Patrick Hallinan. As a result of his assistance to the government, Mancuso was allowed to keep $5 million in proceeds from his trafficking business. Hallinan was subsequently acquitted of obstruction of justice and drug conspiracy charges. Mancuso's property in Hawaii was seized by the federal government and sold; the $800,000 proceeds were forwarded to the California and Nevada law enforcement agencies that pursued him.

His daughter, Julia Mancuso, was a decorated member of the U.S. Ski Team until retiring following an injury. She won the gold medal in the giant slalom event at the 2006 Winter Olympics in Torino, Italy, the silver medal in the downhill event at the 2010 Winter Olympics in Vancouver, Canada, and the bronze medal in the women's combined event at the 2014 Winter Olympics in Sochi, Russia. After his release from prison in March 2000, Ciro Mancuso again became involved in Julia's skiing career. Father and daughter have maintained a close relationship, and she credits him with helping her in her ski career, particularly when it comes to setting her up with a trainer in Maui.
