= Pierre Chapo =

French furniture designer and craftsman (1927-1987)

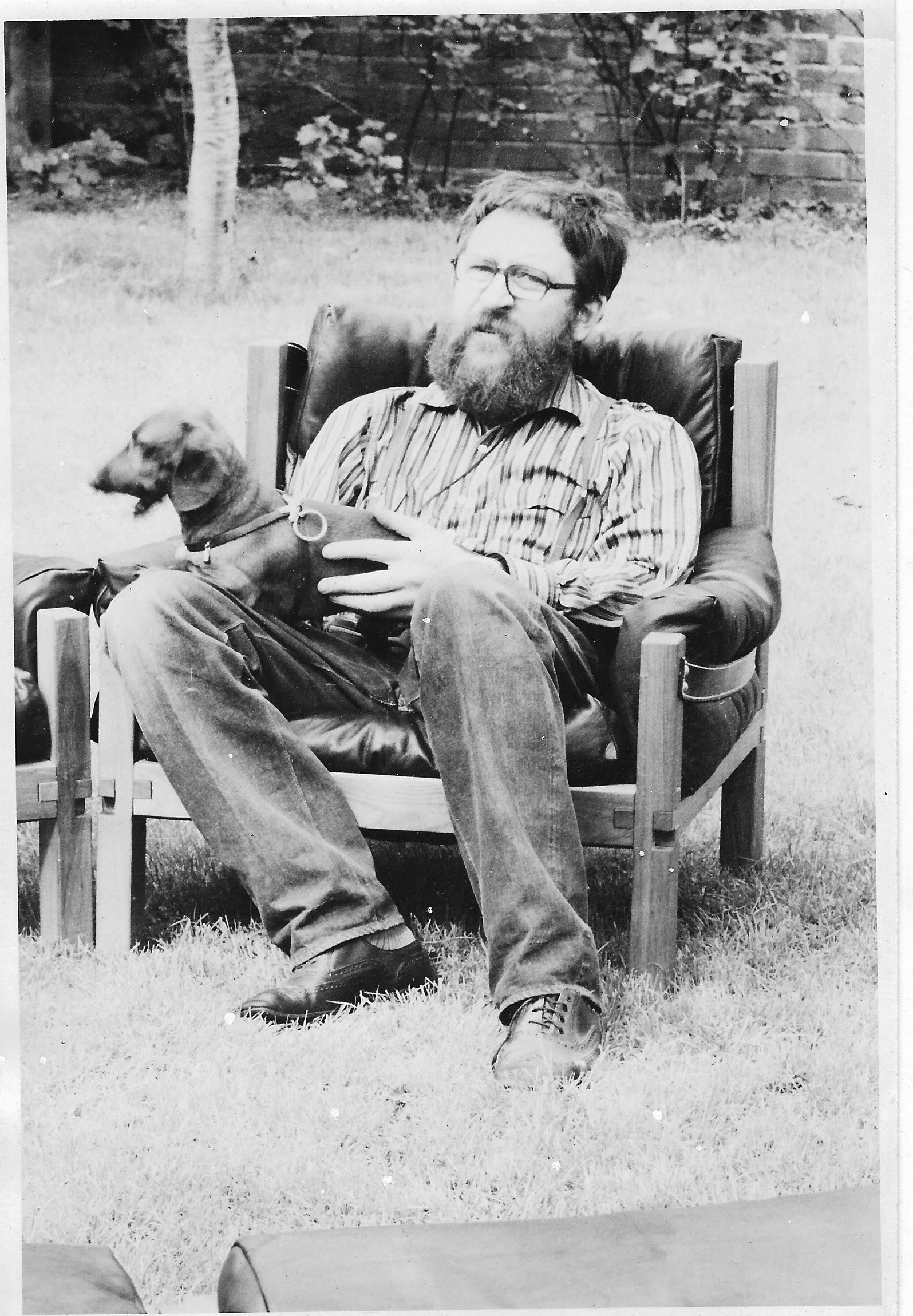
- Born: 1927; Paris, France
- Died: 1987 (aged 59–60)
- Occupation: Furniture design
- Notable work: Table Œil

Pierre Chapo (23 July 1927 – June 1987), born in Paris, was a French furniture designer and craftsman.

== Biography ==
Pierre Chapo was first interested in painting, his encounter with a shipbuilding carpenter in 1947, introduced him to wood and woodworking, and led to architectural studies at the École nationale supérieure des Beaux-Arts in Paris. After traveling through Scandinavia, Central America and working for a year in the United States, he returned to Paris and pursued his interest in wood, crafting furniture mainly out of solid oak, elm, ash or teak with a double concern for contemporary design and traditional know-how. He opened a gallery on boulevard de l'Hôpital in the 13th arrondissement of Paris, where along his own creations, he displayed the work of other craftsmen or artists such as Isamu Noguchi with whom he shared a sculptural and organic approach to design.

Special custom orders started coming in, Samuel Beckett was among his first clients; for him, he created the ‘’Godot bed’’ in his Clamart workshop.

In 1960 he received the gold medal from the city of Paris.

Influenced by the work of Charlotte Perriand for the Alpine ski resort of Les Arcs, his participation in the 1967 Société des artistes décorateurs' show brought him a bronze medal.

That same year he moved to Gordes, near Avignon in Provence, and started his furniture business, producing his own bold, rugged designs anchored in tradition.

Along his work on design he also gave lectures in France and abroad, on cabinet-making, joinery, wood, tradition, creation and sincerity.

In 1983, Pierre Chapo was diagnosed with Lou Gehrig's disease and died in 1987, shortly before his sixtieth birthday.

== Bibliography ==
- Anne Bony, Ivan Rakočević: Furniture & interiors of the 1970s, Flammarion 2005.
- Connaissance des arts, Volumes 662-664.
- New York Magazine Company, 2004, New York, Volume 37, Issues 38-46.
- John C. Brasfield Publishing Corporation, Architectural Digest, Volume 66, Issues 4-6, 2009.
- Sociéte d'études et de publications économiques, Techniques et architecture, Issues 321-324, 1978.
