= Ćiro =

Ćiro is a predominantly Croatian and occasionally Serbian name. It is within the 2,000 most common first names in Croatia. The name is more common in southern Croatia. Its first known mention was in a 1749 tax census.

== Notable people ==
- Ćiro Truhelka (1865–1942), Croatian archeologist, historian and art historian
- Miroslav Ćiro Blažević (1935–2023), Croatian football player and manager
- Zdravko-Ćiro Kovačić (1925–2015), Croatian waterpolo player
