= Elisabeth Le Guin =

American musicologist and cellist

- Born: July 25, 1957 (age 69)
- Occupations: Musicologist; cellist
- Mother: Ursula K. Le Guin
- Awards: Noah Greenberg Award (2007); Guggenheim Fellowship (2019); Fellow of the American Academy of Arts and Sciences (2021)

Academic background
- Education: San Francisco Conservatory of Music; University of California, Berkeley
- Thesis: "As My Works Show Me To Be": Physicality as Compositional Technique in the Instrumental Music of Luigi Boccherini (1997)
- Doctoral advisor: Daniel Heartz

Academic work
- Discipline: Musicology
- Institutions: University of California, Los Angeles

Elisabeth Covel Le Guin (born July 25, 1957) is an American musicologist and cellist. Originally the Philharmonia Baroque Orchestra's principal cellist in the 1980s, she later got her PhD in music at the University of California, Berkeley, and she worked at the University of California, Los Angeles from 1997 until 2022. A Guggenheim Fellow and Fellow of the American Academy of Arts and Sciences, she is the author of Boccherini's Body (2005) and The Tonadilla in Performance (2013).

== Biography ==
Le Guin was born on July 25, 1957; her parents were science fiction author Ursula K. Le Guin and historian Charles Le Guin.

She attended the San Francisco Conservatory of Music, where she obtained BMus in Cello in 1979. She performed as a cellist for decades; she was part of Artaria String Quartet, Boston Early Music Festival, Concerto Amabile and Smithsonian Concerto Grosso, and she became the Philharmonia Baroque Orchestra's principal cellist in 1986. She later did graduate studies at University of California, Berkeley, where she obtained an MA in 1992 and PhD in music in 1997; her doctoral dissertation "As My Works Show Me To Be": Physicality as Compositional Technique in the Instrumental Music of Luigi Boccherini was supervised by Daniel Heartz.

In 1997, she joined the University of California, Los Angeles. She won the 2003 Alfred Einstein Award and 2007 Noah Greenberg Award. In 2005, she published Boccherini's Body, which focuses on the work of Classical-era composer Luigi Boccherini. She won the 2015 Otto Kinkeldey Award for her book The Tonadilla in Performance (2013), which its publisher called the "first major study of the tonadilla in English". In 2022, she retired from UCLA and became professor emeritus.

She was awarded a Guggenheim Fellowship in Music Research in 2019, providing funding for Si Yo Fuera Una Canción, a bilingual podcast about the musical interests of people in Santa Ana, California. She was elected Fellow of the American Academy of Arts and Sciences in 2021.

== Bibliography ==
- Boccherini's Body (2005)
- The Tonadilla in Performance (2013)
