= Le Guin (crater) =

Crater on Mercury

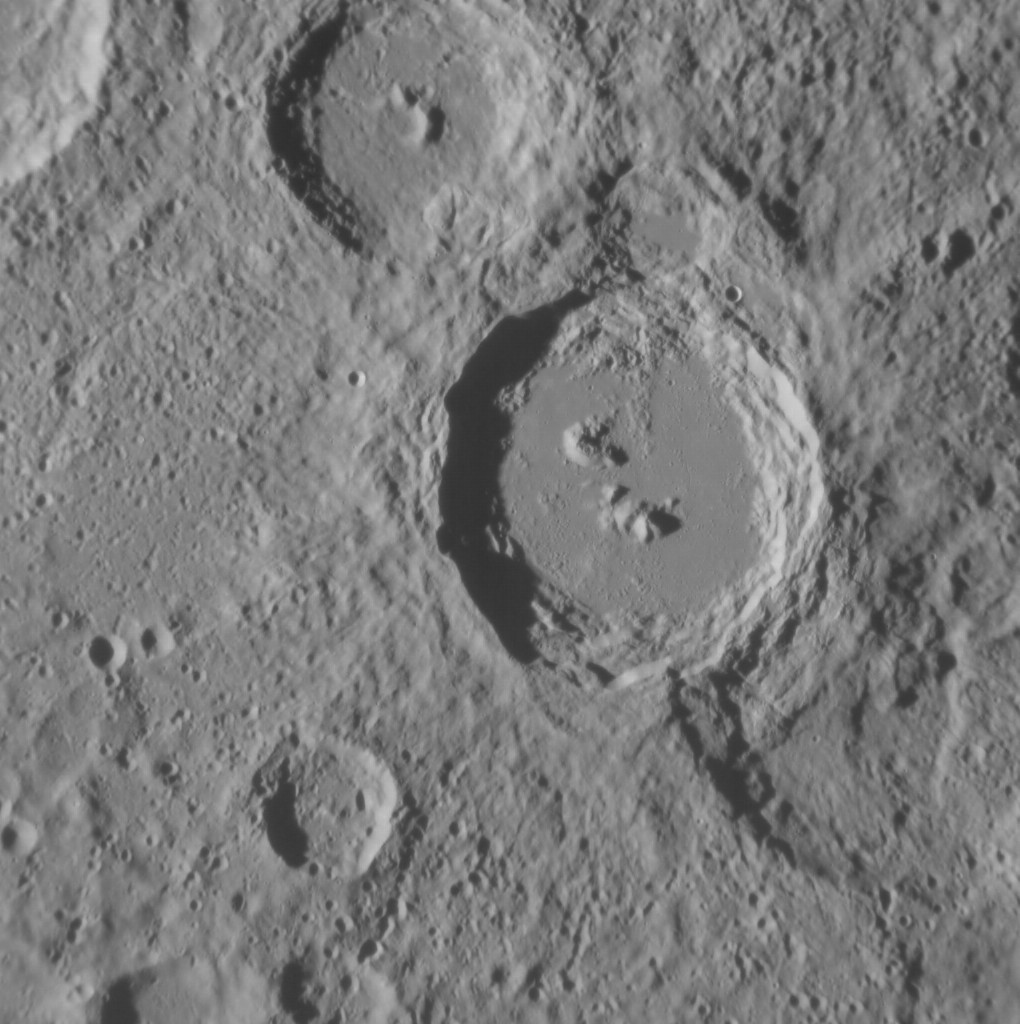
- MESSENGER NAC
- Planet: Mercury
- Coordinates: 18.76°S 102.74°W
- Quadrangle: Beethoven
- Diameter: 61.0 km (37.9 mi)
- Eponym: Ursula K. Le Guin

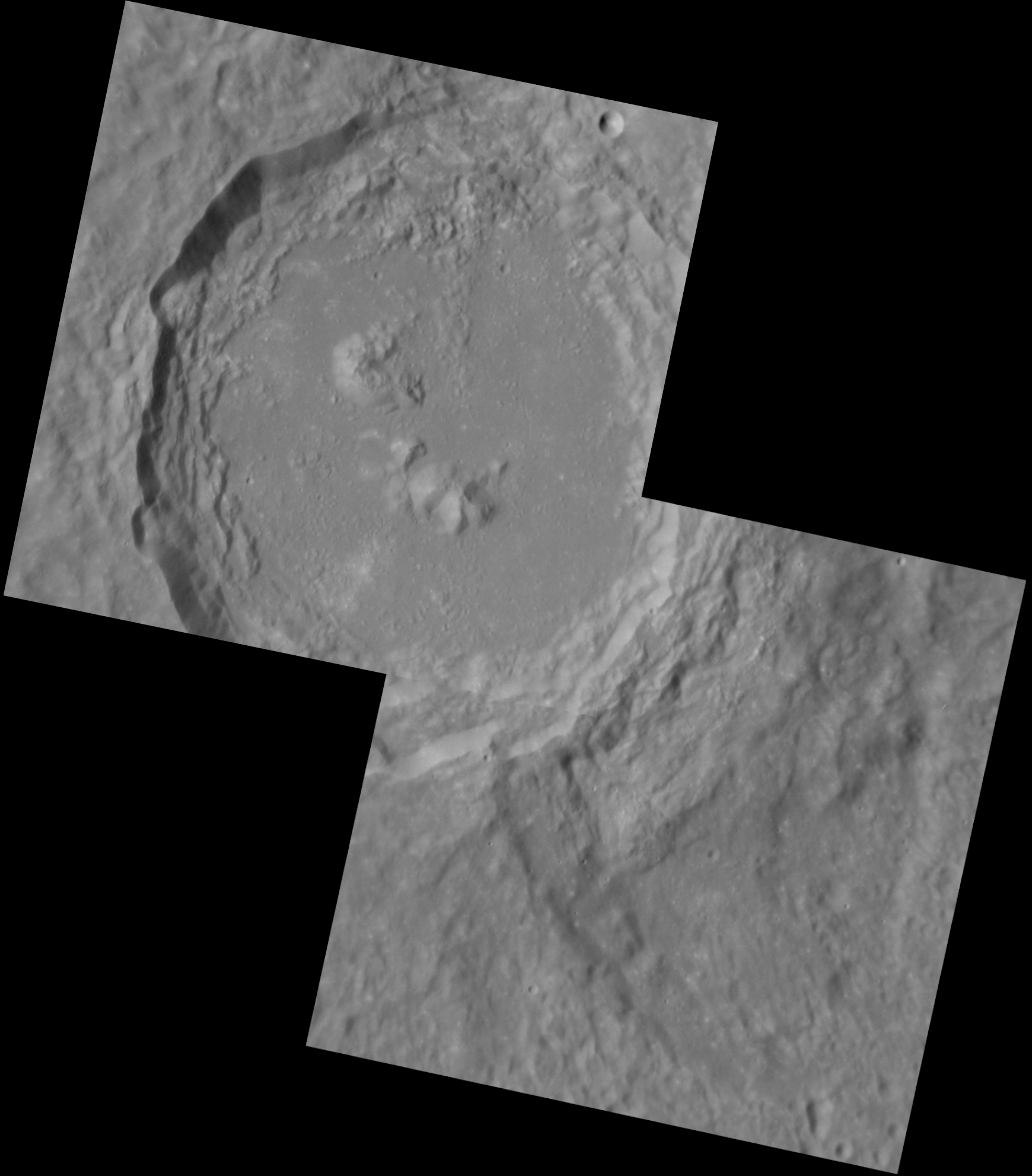
MESSENGER mosaic

Le Guin is a crater on Mercury. Its name was adopted by the International Astronomical Union (IAU) on November 14, 2024. The crater is named for American author Ursula Kroeber Le Guin.

Le Guin is to the north of the crater Rūmī, and northeast of the large basin Beethoven.
