= Rūmī (crater) =

Crater on Mercury

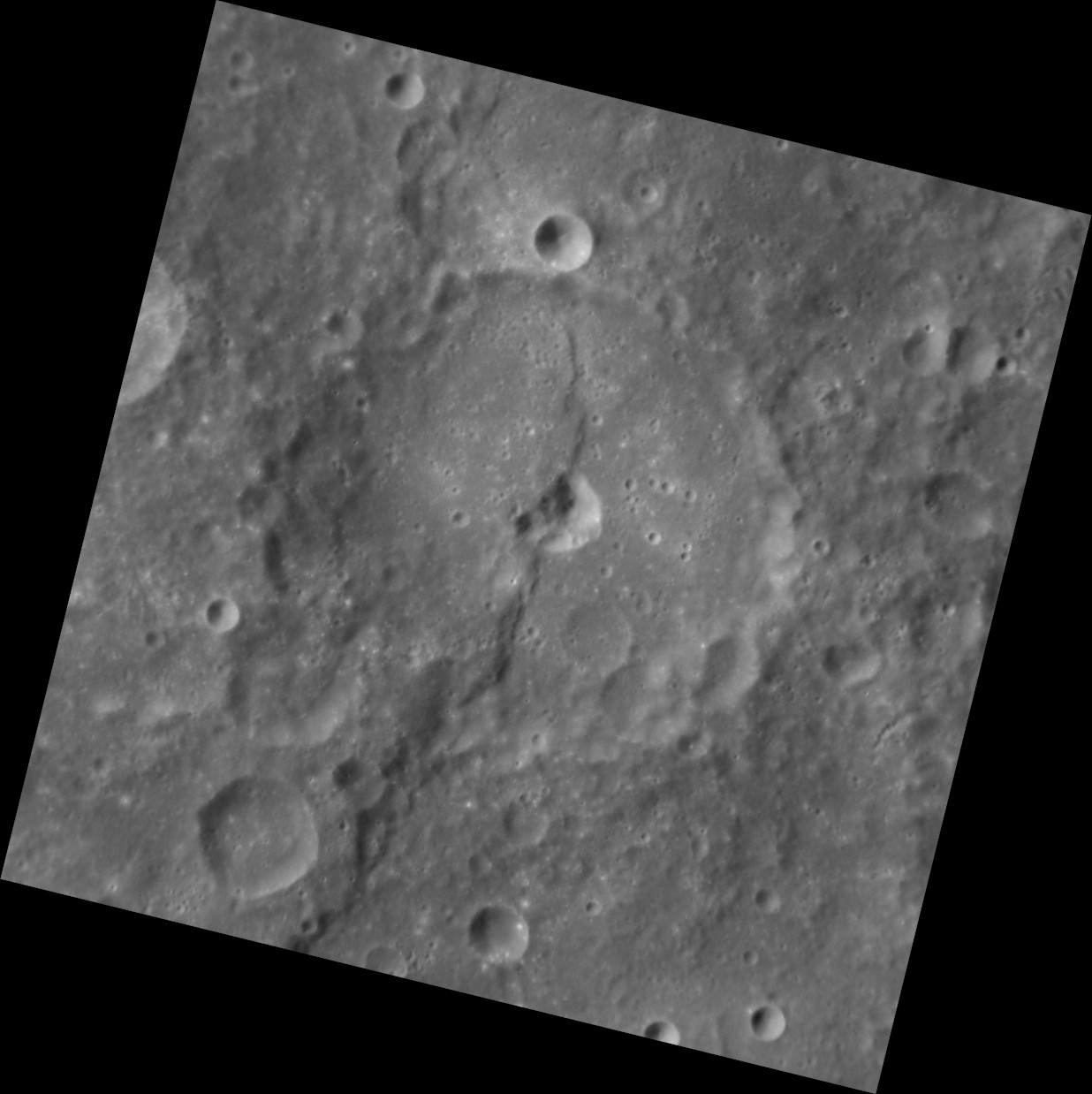
- MESSENGER NAC
- Planet: Mercury
- Coordinates: 24.2°S 105.3°W
- Quadrangle: Michelangelo
- Diameter: 75 km (47 mi)
- Eponym: Rumi

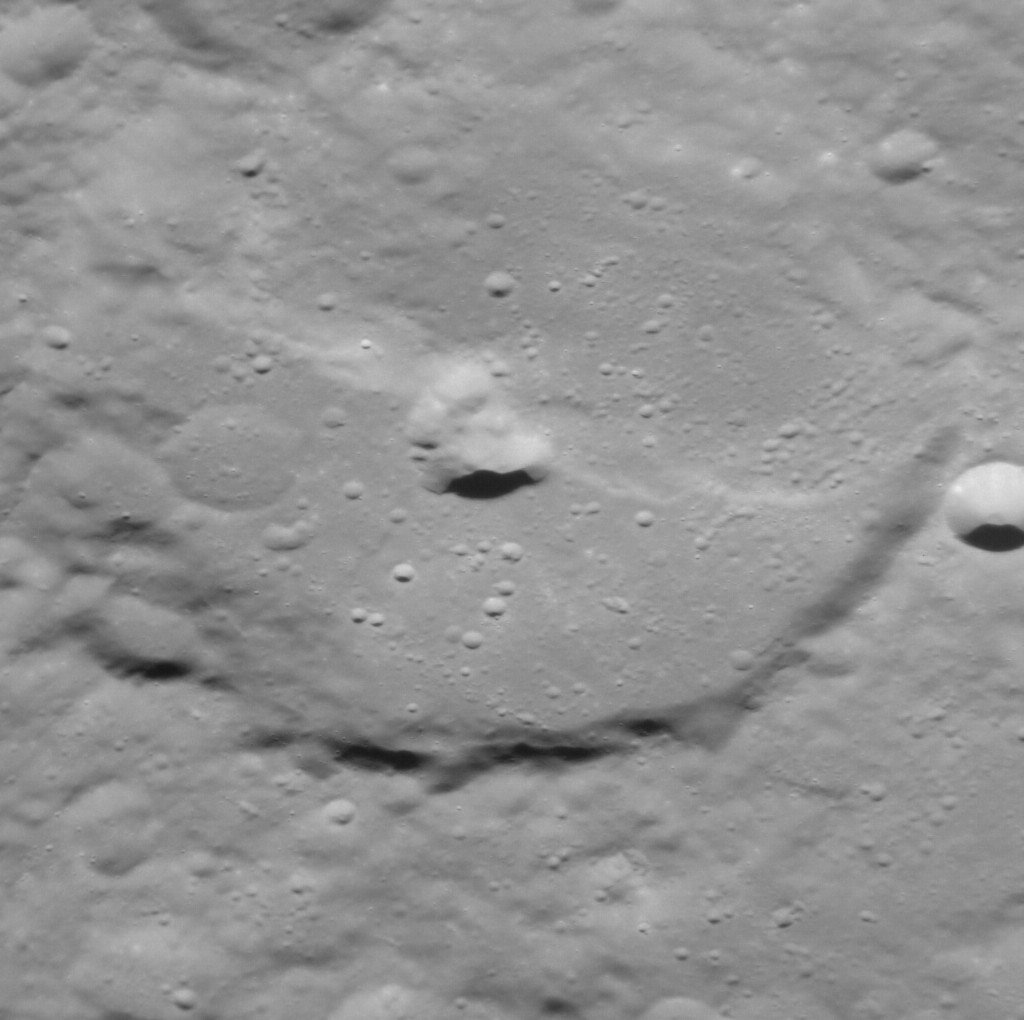
Oblique view

Rūmī is a crater on Mercury. It has a diameter of 75 kilometres (47 miles). Its name was adopted by the International Astronomical Union (IAU) in 1985. Rūmī is named for the Persian poet Rumi.

There is an irregular depression in the center of the floor of Rūmī crater, and this depression is surrounded by somewhat brighter material than the rest of the floor of the crater. The combination of the presence of the irregular pit with a halo around it supports interpretation the pit as a site of explosive volcanism. There is a similar irregular pit with bright material around it in the unnamed craterto the north.

A scarp known as Palmer Rupes cuts across Rūmī and extends to the southwest.

To the north of Rūmī is the crater Le Guin. To the west is the large Beethoven basin.
