= The Language of the Night =

Book by Ursula K. Le Guin

- Book cover
- Editor: Susan Wood
- Author: Ursula K. Le Guin
- Cover artist: Mike Mariano
- Language: English
- Genre: Essay
- Published: 1979 (Putnam Adult)
- Media type: Print
- Pages: 270
- ISBN: 978-0399123252

The Language of the Night: Essays on Fantasy and Science Fiction is a collection of essays written by Ursula K. Le Guin and edited by Susan Wood. It was first published in 1979 and published in a revised edition in 1992. The essays discuss various aspects of the science fiction and fantasy genres, as well as Le Guin's own writing process. The 24 essay selections come from a variety of sources, including journals, book introductions, and award-acceptance speeches. The title comes from Le Guin's description of fantasy literature: "We like to think we live in daylight, but half the world is always dark; and fantasy, like poetry, speaks the language of the night."

Well known as a fantasy and science fiction author by 1979, Le Guin's criticism was relatively difficult to find prior to the publication of this collection. The Language of the Night contains "the most important critical statements [Le Guin] has made to date", addressing topics such as Americans' attitudes towards fantasy fiction, the strengths and weaknesses of science fiction, and the qualities of children's literature. She also discusses the background of her major works, such as A Wizard of Earthsea and The Left Hand of Darkness.

A 2024 edition of the collection features a new introduction by the writer Ken Liu.

== Summary ==
The collection is divided into five parts, each with its own introduction.

=== Part I: Le Guin Introduces Le Guin ===
The first part contains an introduction and the essay "A Citizen of Mondath".

=== Part II: On Fantasy and Science Fiction ===
The second section includes the essays "Why are Americans Afraid of Dragons?", "Dreams Must Explain Themselves", her speech at the National Book Award, "The Child and the Shadow", "Myth and Archetype in Science Fiction", "From Elfland to Poughkeepsie", "American SF and the Other", "Science Fiction and Mrs. Brown", and "Do-It-Yourself Cosmology".

=== Part III: The Book Is What Is Real ===
The third section contains the introductions to her novels Rocannon's World, Planet of Exile, City of Illusions, The Word for World is Forest, The Left Hand of Darkness, and Star Songs of an Old Primate. Additionally, there are the essays "Is Gender Necessary? Redux", "The Staring Eye", and "The Modest One".

=== Part IV: Telling the Truth ===
The fourth part contains the essays "Introduction to the Altered I (excerpt)", "Talking about Writing", and "Escape Routes".

=== Part V: Pushing at the Limits ===
The fifth and final part contains an introduction, and the two essays "The Stalin in the Soul" and "The Stone Ax and the Muskoxen".

== Reception ==
The Language of the Night has received positive reviews. Author Peter S. Beagle called the book "splendid." Writing for Games International in 1989, Paul Mason called this "a classic book that should be on every fantasy gamer's shelves."

Patrick Curry, in the 2014 book A Companion to J. R. R. Tolkien, wrote that Le Guin's reflections in the essays "remain[ed] evergreen", handling contentious issues such as whether fantasy is escapist, the subtlety of the character portraits in The Lord of the Rings, and that work's handling of the nature of evil.

However, some critics noted that the selections in The Language of the Night vary in significance, with "both substantial and slender contributions to science-fiction journals and symposiums."

For the 1980 Hugo Awards, the collection was a nominee in the newly created category of Best Related Non-Fiction Book.
