= Ursula K. Le Guin =

American author (1929–2018)

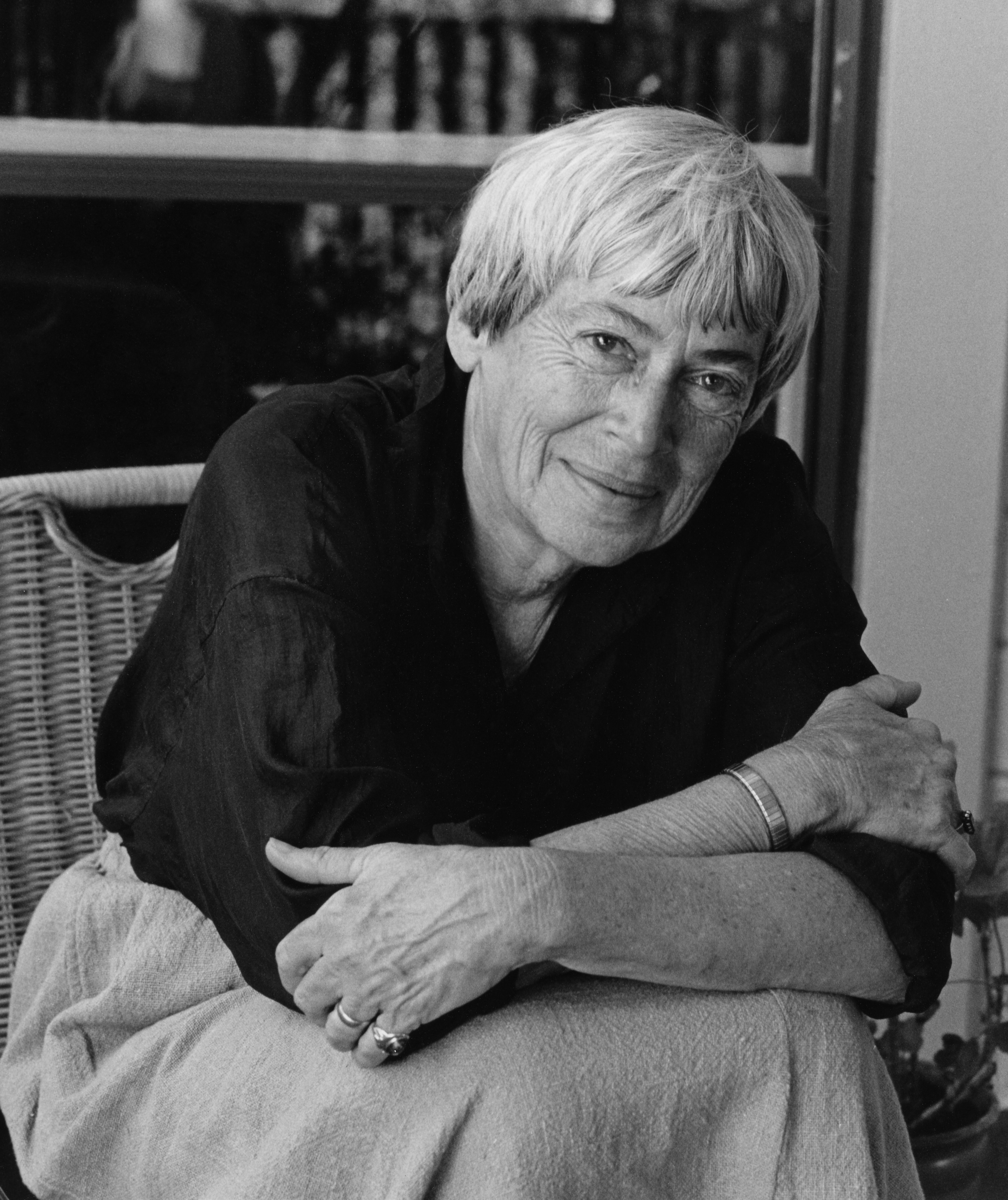
- Le Guin in 1995
- Born: Ursula Kroeber; October 21, 1929; Berkeley, California, US
- Died: January 22, 2018 (aged 88); Portland, Oregon, US
- Education: Radcliffe College (BA); Columbia University (MA)
- Occupation: Author
- Spouse: Charles Le Guin (m. 1953)
- Children: 3
- Parents: Alfred Kroeber; Theodora Kroeber
- Relatives: Karl Kroeber (brother)
- Writing career
- Period: c. 1959–2018
- Genres: Science fiction; fantasy; realistic fiction; literary criticism; poetry; essay
- Notable works: Earthsea (1964–2018); The Left Hand of Darkness (1969); The Dispossessed (1974)
- Website: www.ursulakleguin.com

Ursula Kroeber Le Guin (/ˈkroʊbər lə ˈɡwɪn/ KROH-bər lə GWIN; née Kroeber; October 21, 1929 – January 22, 2018) was an American author. She is best known for her works of speculative fiction, including science fiction works set in her Hainish universe and the fantasy series Earthsea. Her work was first published in 1959, and her literary career spanned nearly sixty years, producing more than twenty novels and more than a hundred short stories, in addition to poetry, literary criticism, translations, and children's books. Frequently described as an author of science fiction, Le Guin has also been called a "major voice in American Letters". Le Guin said that she would prefer to be known as an "American novelist".

Le Guin was born in Berkeley, California, to author and anthropologist Theodora Kroeber and anthropologist Alfred Louis Kroeber. Having earned a master's degree in French, Le Guin began doctoral studies but abandoned these after her marriage in 1953 to historian Charles Le Guin. She began writing full-time in the late 1950s, and she achieved major critical and commercial success with the novels A Wizard of Earthsea (1968) and The Left Hand of Darkness (1969); these have been described by Harold Bloom as her masterpieces. For the latter volume, Le Guin won both the Hugo and Nebula awards for best novel, becoming the first woman to do so. Several more works set in Earthsea or the Hainish universe followed; others included books set in the fictional country of Orsinia, several works for children, and many anthologies.

Cultural anthropology, Taoism, feminism, and the writings of Carl Jung all had a strong influence on Le Guin's work. Many of her stories used anthropologists or cultural observers as protagonists, and Taoist ideas about balance and equilibrium have been identified in several writings. Le Guin often subverted typical speculative fiction tropes, such as by writing dark-skinned protagonists in Earthsea, and also used unusual stylistic or structural devices in works such as the experimental Always Coming Home (1985). Social and political themes, including race, gender, sexuality, and coming of age were prominent in her writing. She explored alternative political structures in many stories, such as the philosophical short story "The Ones Who Walk Away from Omelas" (1973) and the anarchist utopian novel The Dispossessed (1974).

Le Guin's writing was enormously influential in the field of speculative fiction and has been the subject of intense critical attention. She received numerous accolades, including eight Hugo Awards, six Nebula Awards, and twenty-five Locus Awards; in 2003, she became the second woman honored as a Grand Master of the Science Fiction and Fantasy Writers of America. The U.S. Library of Congress named her a Living Legend in 2000, and in 2014, she won the National Book Foundation Medal for Distinguished Contribution to American Letters. Le Guin influenced many other authors, including the Booker Prize winner Salman Rushdie, David Mitchell, Neil Gaiman, and Iain Banks. After her death in 2018, critic John Clute wrote that Le Guin had "presided over American science fiction for nearly half a century", while author Michael Chabon referred to her as the "greatest American writer of her generation".

== Life ==
=== Childhood and education ===
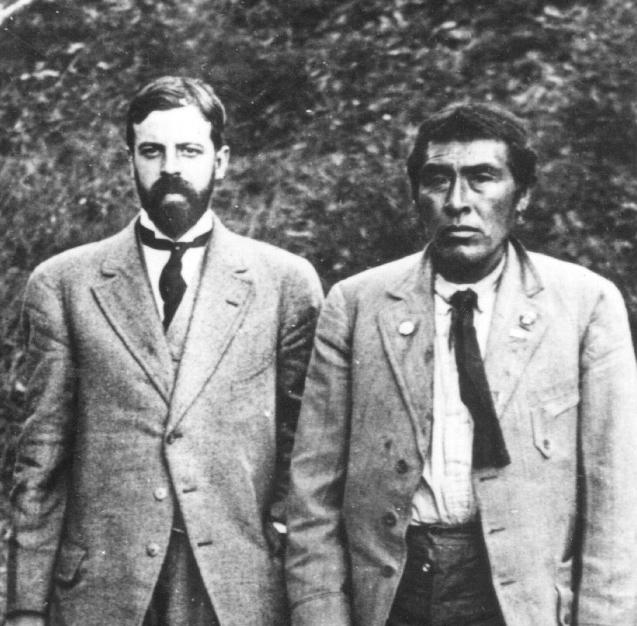
Ursula's father, Alfred Kroeber, with Ishi, the last of the Yahi people (1911)

Ursula Kroeber was born in Berkeley, California, on October 21, 1929. Her father, Alfred Louis Kroeber, was an anthropologist at the University of California, Berkeley. Le Guin's mother, Theodora Kroeber (born Theodora Covel Kracaw), had a graduate degree in psychology, but turned to writing in her 60s, developing a successful career as an author. Among her works was Ishi in Two Worlds (1961), a biographical volume about Ishi, an Indigenous American who had been studied by Alfred Kroeber. Ishi was the last known member of the Yahi tribe after the rest of its members died or were killed by white colonizers.

Le Guin had three older brothers: Karl, who became a literary scholar, Theodore, and Clifton. The family had a large book collection, and the siblings all became interested in reading while they were young. The Kroeber family had a number of visitors, including well-known academics such as Robert Oppenheimer; Le Guin would later use Oppenheimer as the model for Shevek, the physicist protagonist of The Dispossessed. The family divided its time between a home in Napa Valley during the summer and a house in Berkeley during the academic year.

Le Guin's reading included science fiction and fantasy: she and her siblings often read issues of Thrilling Wonder Stories and Astounding Science Fiction. She was fond of myths and legends, particularly Norse mythology, and of Native American legends that her father would narrate. Other authors who she enjoyed were Lord Dunsany and Lewis Padgett. In addition to reading, Le Guin also developed an early interest in writing; she wrote a short story when she was nine, and submitted her first short story to Astounding Science Fiction when she was 11. The piece was rejected, and she did not submit anything else for another 10 years.

Le Guin attended Berkeley High School. From 1947 to 1951 she took a Bachelor of Arts degree in Renaissance French and Italian literature from Radcliffe College of Harvard University, graduating as a member of the Phi Beta Kappa honor society. As a child she had been interested in biology and poetry, but had been limited in her choice of career by her difficulties with mathematics. Le Guin undertook graduate studies at Columbia University, and earned a Master of Arts degree in French in 1952. Soon after, she began working towards a PhD, and won a Fulbright grant to continue her studies in France from 1953 to 1954.

=== Married life and death ===
In 1953, while traveling to France aboard the Queen Mary, Ursula met historian Charles Le Guin. They married in Paris in December 1953. According to Le Guin, the marriage signaled the "end of the doctorate" for her. While her husband finished his doctorate at Emory University in Georgia, and later at the University of Idaho, Le Guin taught French: first at Mercer University, then at the University of Idaho after their move. She also worked as a secretary until the birth of her daughter Elisabeth in 1957. A second daughter, Caroline, was born in 1959. Also in that year, Charles became an instructor in history at Portland State University, and the couple moved to Portland, Oregon, where their son Theodore was born in 1964. They would live in Portland for the rest of their lives, although Le Guin received further Fulbright grants to travel to London in 1968 and 1975.

Le Guin's writing career began in the late 1950s, but the time she spent caring for her children initially constrained her writing schedule. She would continue writing and publishing for nearly 60 years. She also worked as an editor, and taught undergraduate classes. She served on the editorial boards of the journals Paradoxa and Science Fiction Studies, in addition to writing literary criticism herself. She taught courses at Tulane University, Bennington College, and Stanford University, among other institutions.

Le Guin died on January 22, 2018, at her home in Portland, at the age of 88. Her son said that she had been in poor health for several months, and stated that she had likely suffered a heart attack. Private memorial services for her were held in Portland. A public memorial service, which included speeches by the writers Margaret Atwood, Molly Gloss, and Walidah Imarisha, was held in Portland on June 13, 2018.

=== Views and advocacy ===
I think hard times are coming when we will be wanting the voices of writers who can see alternatives to how we live now and can see through our fear-stricken society and its obsessive technologies. We will need writers who can remember freedom. Poets, visionaries – the realists of a larger reality.

— Ursula K. Le Guin

Le Guin refused a Nebula Award for her story "The Diary of the Rose" in 1977, in protest of the Science Fiction Writers of America's revocation of Stanisław Lem's membership. Le Guin attributed the revocation to Lem's criticism of American science fiction and willingness to live in the Eastern Bloc of states, and said she felt reluctant to receive an award "for a story about political intolerance from a group that had just displayed political intolerance".

Le Guin once said that she was "raised as irreligious as a jackrabbit". She expressed a deep interest in Taoism and Buddhism, saying that Taoism gave her a "handle on how to look at life" during her adolescent years. In 1997, she published a translation of the Tao Te Ching.

In December 2009, Le Guin resigned from the Authors Guild in protest over its endorsement of Google's book digitization project. "You decided to deal with the devil", she wrote in her resignation letter. "There are principles involved, above all the whole concept of copyright; and these you have seen fit to abandon to a corporation, on their terms, without a struggle." In a speech at the 2014 National Book Awards, Le Guin criticized Amazon and the control it exerted over the publishing industry, specifically referencing Amazon's treatment of the Hachette Book Group during a dispute over ebook publication. Her speech received widespread media attention within and outside the United States, and was broadcast twice by National Public Radio.

== Chronology of writings ==
=== Early work ===
Le Guin's first published work was the poem "Folksong from the Montayna Province" in 1959, while her first published short story was "An die Musik", in 1961; both were set in her fictional country of Orsinia. Between 1951 and 1961 she also wrote five novels, all set in Orsinia, which were rejected by publishers on the grounds that they were inaccessible. Some of her poetry from this period was published in 1975 in the volume Wild Angels. Le Guin turned her attention to science fiction after a lengthy period of receiving rejections from publishers, knowing that there was a market for writing that could be readily classified as such. Her first professional publication was the short story "April in Paris" in 1962 in Fantastic Science Fiction, and seven other stories followed in the next few years, in Fantastic or Amazing Stories. Among them were "The Dowry of Angyar", which introduced the fictional Hainish universe, and "The Rule of Names" and "The Word of Unbinding", which introduced the world of Earthsea. These stories were largely ignored by critics.

Ace Books released Rocannon's World, Le Guin's first published novel, in 1966. Two more Hainish novels, Planet of Exile and City of Illusions were published in 1966 and 1967, respectively, and the three books together would come to be known as the Hainish trilogy. The first two were each published as half of an "Ace Double": two novels bound into a paperback and sold as a single low-cost volume. City of Illusions was published as a standalone volume, indicating Le Guin's growing name recognition. These books received more critical attention than Le Guin's short stories, with reviews being published in several science fiction magazines, but the critical response was still muted. The books contained many themes and ideas also present in Le Guin's better known later works, including the "archetypal journey" of a protagonist who undertakes both a physical journey and one of self-discovery, cultural contact and communication, the search for identity, and the reconciliation of opposing forces.

When publishing her story "Nine Lives" in 1968, Playboy magazine asked Le Guin whether they could run the story without her full first name, to which Le Guin agreed: the story was published under the name "U. K. Le Guin". She later wrote that it was the first and only time she had experienced prejudice against her as a woman writer from an editor or publisher, and reflected that "it seemed so silly, so grotesque, that I failed to see that it was also important." In subsequent printings, the story was published under her full name.

=== Critical attention ===
Le Guin's next two books brought her sudden and widespread critical acclaim. A Wizard of Earthsea, published in 1968, was a fantasy novel written initially for teenagers. Le Guin had not planned to write for young adults, but was asked to write a novel targeted at this group by the editor of Parnassus Press, who saw it as a market with great potential. A coming of age story set in the fictional archipelago of Earthsea, the book received a positive reception in both the U.S. and Britain.

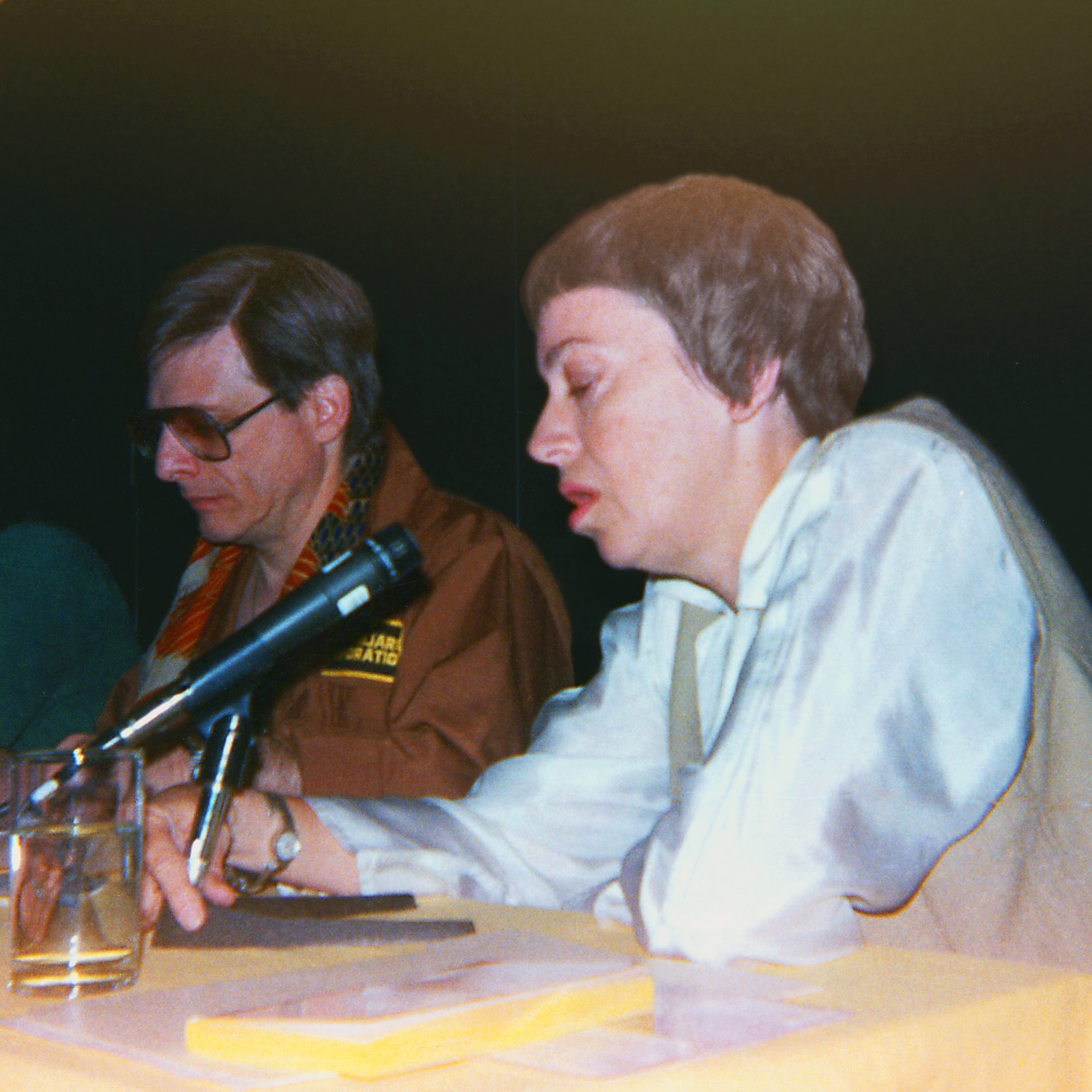
Le Guin with Harlan Ellison at Westercon in Portland, Oregon (1984)

Her next novel, The Left Hand of Darkness, was a Hainish universe story exploring themes of gender and sexuality on a fictional planet where humans have no fixed sex. The book was Le Guin's first to address feminist issues, and according to scholar Donna White, it "stunned the science fiction critics"; it won both the Hugo and the Nebula Awards for best novel, making Le Guin the first woman to win both these awards, and earned her a number of other accolades. A Wizard of Earthsea and The Left Hand of Darkness have been described by critic Harold Bloom as Le Guin's masterpieces. She won the Hugo Award again in 1973 for The Word for World Is Forest. The book was influenced by Le Guin's anger over the Vietnam War, and explored themes of colonialism and militarism; Le Guin later described it as the "most overt political statement" she had made in a fictional work.

Le Guin continued to develop themes of equilibrium and coming-of-age in the next two instalments of the Earthsea series, The Tombs of Atuan (1971) and The Farthest Shore (1972). Both books were praised for their writing, while the exploration of death as a theme in The Farthest Shore also drew praise. Her 1974 novel The Dispossessed again won both the Hugo and the Nebula awards for best novel, making her the first person to win both awards for each of two books. Also set in the Hainish universe, the story explored anarchism and utopianism. Scholar Charlotte Spivack described it as representing a shift in Le Guin's science fiction towards discussing political ideas. Several of her speculative fiction short stories, including her first published story, were anthologized in the 1975 collection The Wind's Twelve Quarters. The fiction of the period 1966 to 1974, which also included The Lathe of Heaven, the Hugo Award-winning "The Ones Who Walk Away From Omelas" and the Nebula Award-winning "The Day Before the Revolution", constitutes Le Guin's best-known body of work.

=== Wider exploration ===
Le Guin produced a variety of work in the second half of the 1970s. This included speculative fiction in the form of the novel The Eye of the Heron, which, according to Le Guin, may be a part of the Hainish universe. She also published Very Far Away from Anywhere Else, a realistic novel for adolescents, as well as the collection Orsinian Tales in 1976 and the novel Malafrena in 1979. Though the latter two were set in the fictional country of Orsinia, the stories were realistic fiction rather than fantasy or science fiction. The Language of the Night, a collection of essays, was released in 1979, and Le Guin published Wild Angels, a volume of poetry, in 1975.

Between 1979, when she published Malafrena, and 1994, when the collection A Fisherman of the Inland Sea was released, Le Guin wrote primarily for a younger audience. In 1985 she published the experimental work Always Coming Home. She wrote 11 children's picture books, including the Catwings series, between 1979 and 1994, along with The Beginning Place, an adolescent fantasy novel, released in 1980. Four more poetry collections were published in this period, all of which were positively received. She revisited Earthsea, publishing Tehanu in 1990: coming eighteen years after The Farthest Shore, during which Le Guin's views had developed considerably, the book was grimmer in tone than the earlier works in the series, and challenged some ideas presented therein. It received critical praise, won Le Guin a third Nebula Award for Best Novel, and led to the series being recognized as works of adult literature.

=== Later writings ===
Le Guin returned to the Hainish Cycle in the 1990s after a lengthy hiatus with the publication of a series of short stories, beginning with "The Shobies' Story" in 1990. These stories included "Coming of Age in Karhide" (1995), which explored growing into adulthood and was set on the same planet as The Left Hand of Darkness. It was described by scholar Sandra Lindow as "so transgressively sexual and so morally courageous" that Le Guin "could not have written it in the '60s". In the same year she published the story suite Four Ways to Forgiveness, and followed it up with "Old Music and the Slave Women", a fifth, connected, story in 1999. All five of the stories explored freedom and rebellion within a slave society. In 2000 she published The Telling, which would be her final Hainish novel, and the next year released Tales from Earthsea and The Other Wind, the last two Earthsea books. The latter won the World Fantasy Award for Best Novel in 2002.

From 2002 onwards several collections and anthologies of Le Guin's work were published. A series of her stories from the period 1994–2002 was released in 2002 in the collection The Birthday of the World and Other Stories, along with the novella Paradises Lost. The volume examined unconventional ideas about gender, as well as anarchist themes. Other collections included Changing Planes, also released in 2002, while the anthologies included The Unreal and the Real (2012), and The Hainish Novels and Stories, a two-volume set of works from the Hainish universe released by the Library of America.

New novels from this period included Lavinia (2008), based on a character from Virgil's Aeneid, and the Annals of the Western Shore trilogy, consisting of Gifts (2004), Voices (2006), and Powers (2007). Although Annals of the Western Shore was written for an adolescent audience, the third volume, Powers, received the Nebula Award for Best Novel in 2009. In her final years, Le Guin largely turned away from fiction, and produced a number of essays, poems, and some translation. Her final publications included the non-fiction collections Dreams Must Explain Themselves and Ursula K Le Guin: Conversations on Writing, and the poetry volume So Far So Good: Final Poems 2014–2018, all of which were released after her death.

== Style and influences ==
=== Influences ===
Once I learned to read, I read everything. I read all the famous fantasies – Alice in Wonderland, and Wind in the Willows, and Kipling. I adored Kipling's Jungle Book. And then when I got older I found Lord Dunsany. He opened up a whole new world – the world of pure fantasy. And ... Worm Ouroboros. Again, pure fantasy. Very, very fattening. And then my brother and I blundered into science fiction when I was 11 or 12. Early Asimov, things like that. But that didn't have too much effect on me. It wasn't until I came back to science fiction and discovered Sturgeon – but particularly Cordwainer Smith. ... I read the story "Alpha Ralpha Boulevard", and it just made me go, "Wow! This stuff is so beautiful, and so strange, and I want to do something like that."

— Ursula K. Le Guin

Le Guin read both classic and speculative fiction widely in her youth. She later said that science fiction did not have much impact on her until she read the works of Theodore Sturgeon and Cordwainer Smith, and that she had sneered at the genre as a child. Authors Le Guin describes as influential include Victor Hugo, William Wordsworth, Charles Dickens, Boris Pasternak, and Philip K. Dick. Le Guin and Dick attended the same high-school, but did not know each other; Le Guin later described her novel The Lathe of Heaven as an homage to him. She also considered J. R. R. Tolkien and Leo Tolstoy to be stylistic influences, and preferred reading Virginia Woolf and Jorge Luis Borges to well-known science-fiction authors such as Robert Heinlein, whose writing she described as being of the "white man conquers the universe" tradition. Several scholars state that the influence of mythology, which Le Guin enjoyed reading as a child, is also visible in much of her work: for example, the short story "The Dowry of Angyar" is described as a retelling of a Norse myth.

The discipline of cultural anthropology had a powerful influence on Le Guin's writing. Her father Alfred Kroeber is considered a pioneer in the field, and was a director of the University of California Museum of Anthropology: as a consequence of his research, Le Guin was exposed to anthropology and cultural exploration as a child. In addition to myths and legends, she read such volumes as The Leaves of the Golden Bough by Elizabeth Grove Frazer, a children's book adapted from The Golden Bough, a study of myth and religion by her husband James George Frazer. She described living with her father's friends and acquaintances as giving her the experience of the other. The experiences of Ishi, in particular, were influential on Le Guin, and elements of his story have been identified in works such as Planet of Exile, City of Illusions, and The Word for World Is Forest and The Dispossessed.

Several scholars have commented that Le Guin's writing was influenced by Carl Jung, and specifically by the idea of Jungian archetypes. In particular, the shadow in A Wizard of Earthsea, a book whose publication coincided with the heyday of Jungian literary analysis, has been seen as an example of the Shadow archetype from Jungian psychology, representing Ged's pride, fear, and desire for power. Other Jungian archetypes, including the Mother, Animus, and Anima, have also been identified in Le Guin's writing. The sentient planetary forests featured in her novella The Word for World Is Forest and the short story "Vaster Than Empires and More Slow" have been described as a metaphor for the mind, and of the Jungian "collective unconscious". In a 1974 lecture Le Guin discussed her interpretation of the shadow archetype in the work of other writers, and her own interest in the dark and repressed parts of the psyche. (Note: The lecture formed the basis of her 1975 essay "The Child and the Shadow", which was reprinted in her 1979 collection The Language of the Night.) She stated elsewhere that she had never read Jung before writing the first Earthsea books a few years earlier, and she has expressed her dislike of what she considers to be overly reductionist and mechanistic Jungian interpretations of her work. Her later young adult novel,The Beginning Place, has been said to engage more deliberately with Jungian archetypes.

Philosophical Taoism had a large role in Le Guin's world view, and the influence of Taoist thought can be seen in many of her stories. Many of Le Guin's protagonists, including in The Lathe of Heaven, embody the Taoist ideal of leaving things alone. The anthropologists of the Hainish universe try not to meddle with the cultures they encounter, while one of the earliest lessons Ged learns in A Wizard of Earthsea is not to use magic unless it is absolutely necessary. Taoist influence is evident in Le Guin's depiction of equilibrium in the world of Earthsea: the archipelago is depicted as being based on a delicate balance, which is disrupted by somebody in each of the first three novels. This includes an equilibrium between land and sea, implicit in the name "Earthsea", between people and their natural environment, and a larger cosmic equilibrium, which wizards are tasked with maintaining. Another prominent Taoist idea is the reconciliation of opposites such as light and dark, or good and evil. A number of Hainish novels, The Dispossessed prominent among them, explored such a process of reconciliation. In the Earthsea universe, it is not the dark powers, but the characters' misunderstanding of the balance of life, that is depicted as evil, in contrast to conventional Western stories in which good and evil are in constant conflict.

=== Genre and style ===
Although Le Guin is primarily known for her works of speculative fiction, she also wrote realistic fiction, non-fiction, poetry, and several other literary forms, and as a result her work is difficult to classify. Her writings received critical attention from mainstream critics, critics of children's literature, and critics of speculative fiction. Le Guin herself said that she would prefer to be known as an "American novelist". Le Guin's transgression of conventional boundaries of genre led to literary criticism of Le Guin becoming "Balkanized", particularly between scholars of children's literature and speculative fiction. Commentators have noted that the Earthsea novels specifically received less critical attention because they were considered children's books. Le Guin herself took exception to this treatment of children's literature, describing it as "adult chauvinist piggery". In 1976, literature scholar George Slusser criticized the "silly publication classification designating the original series as 'children's literature'", while in Barbara Bucknall's opinion Le Guin "can be read, like Tolkien, by ten-year-olds and by adults. These stories are ageless because they deal with problems that confront us at any age."

Fortunately, though extrapolation is an element in science fiction, it isn't the name of the game by any means. It is far too rationalist and simplistic to satisfy the imaginative mind, whether the writer's or the reader's. Variables are the spice of life. [If] you like you can read [a lot of] science fiction, as a thought-experiment. Let's say (says Mary Shelley) that a young doctor creates a human being in his laboratory; let's say (says Philip K. Dick) that the Allies lost the second world war; let's say this or that is such and so, and see what happens... In a story so conceived, the moral complexity proper to the modern novel need not be sacrificed, nor is there any built-in dead end; thought and intuition can move freely within bounds set only by the terms of the experiment, which may be very large indeed.

— Ursula K. Le Guin, in the introduction to the 1976 edition of The Left Hand of Darkness.

Several of her works have a premise drawn from sociology, psychology, or philosophy. As a result, Le Guin's writing is often described as "soft" science fiction, and she has been described as the "patron saint" of this sub-genre. A number of science fiction authors have objected to the term "soft science fiction", describing it as a potentially pejorative term used to dismiss stories not based on problems in physics, astronomy, or engineering, and also to target the writing of women or other groups under-represented in the genre. Le Guin suggested the term "social science fiction" for some of her writing, while pointing out that many of her stories were not science fiction at all. She argued that the term "soft science fiction" was divisive, and implied a narrow view of what constitutes valid science fiction.

The influence of anthropology can be seen in the setting Le Guin chose for a number of her works. Several of her protagonists are anthropologists or ethnologists exploring a world alien to them. This is particularly true in the stories set in the Hainish universe, an alternative reality in which humans did not evolve on Earth, but on Hain. The Hainish subsequently colonized many planets, before losing contact with them, giving rise to varied but related biology and social structure. Examples include Rocannon in Rocannon's World and Genly Ai in The Left Hand of Darkness. Other characters, such as Shevek in The Dispossessed, become cultural observers in the course of their journeys on other planets. Le Guin's writing often examines alien cultures, and particularly the human cultures from planets other than Earth in the Hainish universe. In discovering these "alien" worlds, Le Guin's protagonists, and by extension the readers, also journey into themselves, and challenge the nature of what they consider "alien" and what they consider "native".

Several of Le Guin's works have featured stylistic or structural features that were unusual or subversive. The heterogeneous structure of The Left Hand of Darkness, described as "distinctly post-modern", was unusual for the time of its publication. This was in marked contrast to the structure of (primarily male-authored) traditional science fiction, which was straightforward and linear. The novel was framed as part of a report sent to the Ekumen by the protagonist Genly Ai after his time on the planet Gethen, thus suggesting that Ai was selecting and ordering the material, consisting of personal narration, diary extracts, Gethenian myths, and ethnological reports. Earthsea also employed an unconventional narrative form described by scholar Mike Cadden as "free indirect discourse", in which the feelings of the protagonist are not directly separated from the narration, making the narrator seem sympathetic to the characters, and removing the skepticism towards a character's thoughts and emotions that are a feature of more direct narration. Cadden suggests that this method leads to younger readers sympathizing directly with the characters, making it an effective technique for young-adult literature.

A number of Le Guin's writings, including the Earthsea series, challenged the conventions of epic fantasies and myths. Many of the protagonists in Earthsea were dark-skinned individuals, in comparison to the white-skinned heroes more traditionally used; some of the antagonists, in contrast, were white-skinned, a switching of race roles that has been remarked upon by multiple critics. In a 2001 interview, Le Guin attributed the frequent lack of character illustrations on her book covers to her choice of non-white protagonists. She explained this choice, saying: "most people in the world aren't white. Why in the future would we assume they are?" Her 1985 book Always Coming Home, described as "her great experiment", included a story told from the perspective of a young protagonist, but also included poems, rough drawings of plants and animals, myths, and anthropological reports from the matriarchal society of the Kesh, a fictional people living in the Napa valley after a catastrophic global flood.

== Themes ==
=== Gender and sexuality ===
Gender and sexuality are prominent themes in a number of Le Guin's works. The Left Hand of Darkness, published in 1969, was among the first books in the genre now known as feminist science fiction, and is the most famous examination of androgyny in science fiction. The story is set on the fictional planet of Gethen, whose inhabitants are ambisexual humans with no fixed gender identity, who adopt female or male sexual characteristics for brief periods of their sexual cycle. Which sex they adopt can depend on context and relationships. Gethen was portrayed as a society without war, as a result of this absence of fixed gender characteristics, and also without sexuality as a continuous factor in social relationships. Gethenian culture was explored in the novel through the eyes of a Terran, whose masculinity proves a barrier to cross-cultural communication. Outside the Hainish Cycle, Le Guin's use of a female protagonist in The Tombs of Atuan, published in 1971, was described as a "significant exploration of womanhood".

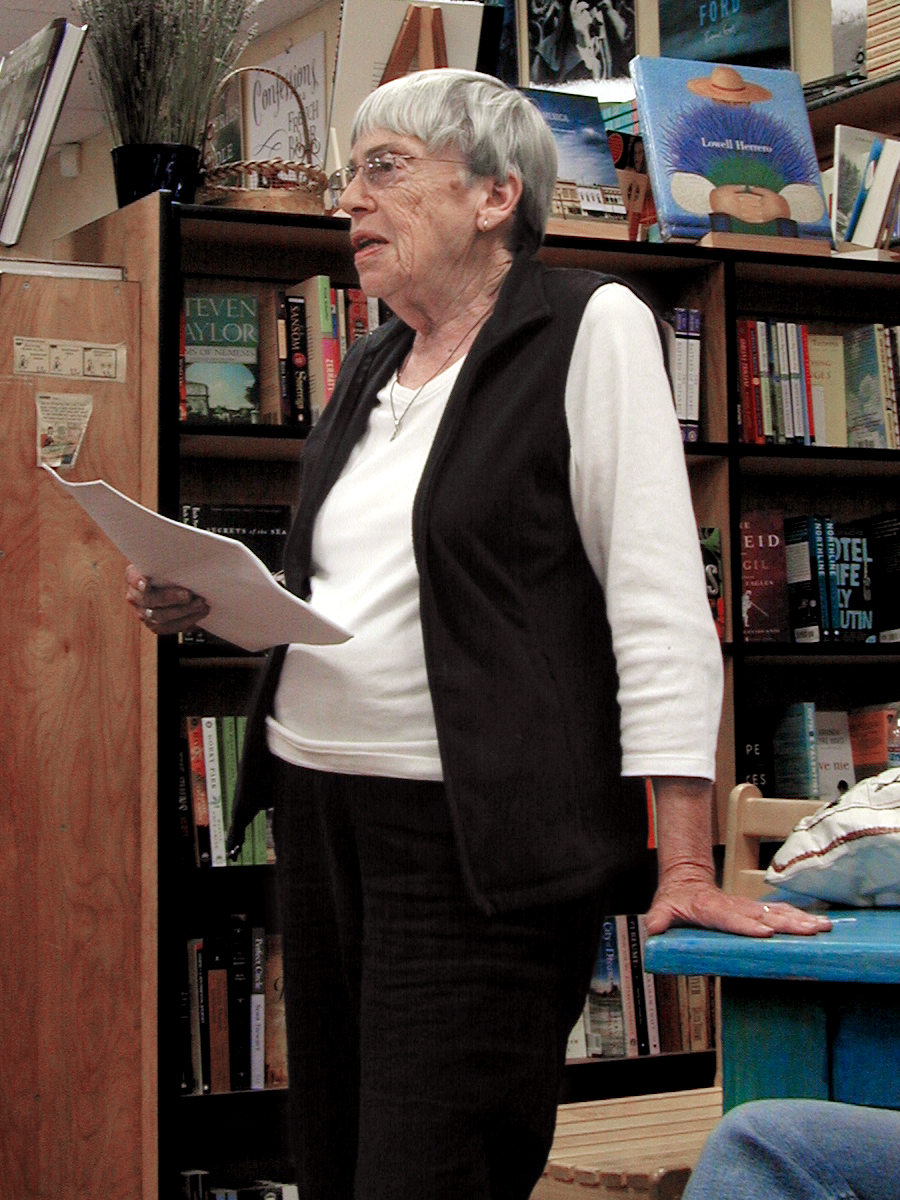
Le Guin at a reading in Danville, California (June 2008)

Le Guin's attitude towards gender and feminism evolved considerably over time. Although The Left Hand of Darkness was seen as a landmark exploration of gender, it also received criticism for not going far enough. Reviewers pointed to its usage of masculine gender pronouns to describe its androgynous characters, the lack of androgynous characters portrayed in stereotypical feminine roles, and the portrayal of heterosexuality as the norm on Gethen. Le Guin's portrayal of gender in Earthsea was also described as perpetuating the notion of a male-dominated world; according to the Encyclopedia of Science Fiction, "Le Guin saw men as the actors and doers in the [world], while women remain the still centre, the well from which they drink". Le Guin initially defended her writing; in a 1976 essay "Is Gender Necessary?" she wrote that gender was secondary to the primary theme of loyalty in The Left Hand of Darkness. Le Guin revisited this essay in 1988, and acknowledged that gender was central to the novel; she also apologized for depicting Gethenians solely in heterosexual relationships.

Le Guin responded to these critiques in her subsequent writing. She intentionally used feminine pronouns for all sexually latent Gethenians in her 1995 short story "Coming of Age in Karhide", and in a later reprinting of "Winter's King", which was first published in 1969. "Coming of Age in Karhide" was later anthologized in the 2002 collection The Birthday of the World, which contained six other stories featuring unorthodox sexual relationships and marital arrangements. She also revisited gender relations in Earthsea in Tehanu, published in 1990. This volume was described as a rewriting or reimagining of The Tombs of Atuan, because the power and status of the female protagonist Tenar are the inverse of what they were in the earlier book, which was also focused on her and Ged. During this later period she commented that she considered The Eye of the Heron, published in 1978, to be her first work genuinely centered on a woman. Le Guin's 1986 essay "The Carrier Bag Theory of Fiction" is a critique of the traditional idea of the hero in storytelling, "shifting the way we look at humanity's foundations from a narrative of domination to one of gathering, holding, and sharing," in the words of critic Siobhan Leddy.

=== Moral development ===
Le Guin explores coming of age, and moral development more broadly, in many of her writings. This is particularly the case in those works written for a younger audience, such as Earthsea and Annals of the Western Shore. Le Guin wrote in a 1973 essay that she chose to explore coming-of-age in Earthsea since she was writing for an adolescent audience: "Coming of age ... is a process that took me many years; I finished it, so far as I ever will, at about age thirty-one; and so I feel rather deeply about it. So do most adolescents. It's their main occupation, in fact." She also said that fantasy was best suited as a medium for describing coming of age, because exploring the subconscious was difficult using the language of "rational daily life".

The first three Earthsea novels together follow Ged from youth to old age, and each of them also follow the coming of age of a different character: Ged himself in A Wizard of Earthsea; Tenar in The Tombs of Atuan and the prince Arren in The Farthest Shore. A Wizard of Earthsea is frequently described as a Bildungsroman, in which Ged's coming of age is intertwined with the physical journey he undertakes through the novel. To Mike Cadden the book was a convincing tale "to a reader as young and possibly as headstrong as Ged, and therefore sympathetic to him". Reviewers have described the ending of the novel, wherein Ged finally accepts the shadow as a part of himself, as a rite of passage. Scholar Jeanne Walker writes that the rite of passage at the end was an analogue for the entire plot of A Wizard of Earthsea, and that the plot itself plays the role of a rite of passage for an adolescent reader.

Each volume of Annals of the Western Shore also describes the coming of age of its protagonists, and features explorations of being enslaved to one's own power. The process of growing up is depicted as seeing beyond narrow choices the protagonists are presented with by society. In Gifts, Orrec and Gry realize that the powers their people possess can be used in two ways: for control and dominion, or for healing and nurturing. This recognition allows them to take a third choice, and leave. This wrestling with choice has been compared to the choices the characters are forced to make in Le Guin's short story "The Ones Who Walk Away from Omelas". Similarly, Ged helps Tenar in The Tombs of Atuan to value herself and to find choices that she did not see, leading her to leave the Tombs with him.

=== Political systems ===
Alternative social and political systems are a recurring theme in Le Guin's writing. Critics have paid particular attention to The Dispossessed and Always Coming Home, although Le Guin explores related themes in a number of her works, such as in "The Ones Who Walk Away From Omelas". The Dispossessed is an anarchist utopian novel, which according to Le Guin drew from pacifist anarchists, including Peter Kropotkin, as well as from the counterculture of the 1960s and 1970s. Le Guin has been credited with "[rescuing] anarchism from the cultural ghetto to which it has been consigned", and helping to bring it into the intellectual mainstream. Fellow author Kathleen Ann Goonan wrote that Le Guin's work confronted the "paradigm of insularity toward the suffering of people, other living beings, and resources", and explored "life-respecting sustainable alternatives".

The Dispossessed, set on the twin planets of Urras and Anarres, features a planned anarchist society depicted as an "ambiguous utopia". The society, created by settlers from Urras, is materially poorer than the wealthy society of Urras, but more ethically and morally advanced. Unlike classical utopias, the society of Anarres is portrayed as neither perfect nor static; the protagonist Shevek finds himself traveling to Urras to pursue his research. Nonetheless, the misogyny and hierarchy present in the authoritarian society of Urras is absent among the anarchists, who base their social structure on cooperation and individual liberty. The Eye of the Heron, published a few years after The Dispossessed, was described as continuing Le Guin's exploration of human freedom, through a conflict between two societies of opposing philosophies: a town inhabited by descendants of pacifists, and a city inhabited by descendants of criminals.

Always Coming Home, set in California in the distant future, examines a warlike society, resembling contemporary American society, from the perspective of the Kesh, its pacifist neighbors. The society of the Kesh has been identified by scholars as a feminist utopia, which Le Guin uses to explore the role of technology. Scholar Warren Rochelle stated that it was "neither a matriarchy nor a patriarchy: men and women just are". "The Ones Who Walk Away From Omelas", a parable depicting a society in which widespread wealth, happiness, and security, comes at the cost of the continued misery of a single child, has also been read as a critique of contemporary American society. The Word for World is Forest explored the manner in which the structure of society affects the natural environment; in the novel, the natives of the planet of Athshe have adapted their way of life to the ecology of the planet. The colonizing human society, in contrast, is depicted as destructive and uncaring; in depicting it, Le Guin also critiqued colonialism and imperialism, driven partly by her disapproval for U.S. intervention in the Vietnam War.

Other social structures are examined in works such as the story cycle Four Ways to Forgiveness, and the short story "Old Music and the Slave Women", occasionally described as a "fifth way to forgiveness". Set in the Hainish universe, the five stories together examine revolution and reconstruction in a slave-owning society. According to Rochelle, the stories examine a society that has the potential to build a "truly human community", made possible by the Ekumen's recognition of the slaves as human beings, thus offering them the prospect of freedom and the possibility of utopia, brought about through revolution. Slavery, justice, and the role of women in society are also explored in Annals of the Western Shore.

== Reception and legacy ==
=== Reception ===
Le Guin received rapid recognition after the publication of The Left Hand of Darkness in 1969, and by the 1970s she was among the best known writers in the field. Her books sold many millions of copies, and were translated into more than 40 languages; several remain in print many decades after their first publication. Her work received intense academic attention; she has been described as being the "premier writer of both fantasy and science fiction" of the 1970s, the most frequently discussed science fiction writer of the 1970s, and over her career, as intensively studied as Philip K. Dick. Later in her career, she also received recognition from mainstream literary critics: in an obituary, Jo Walton stated that Le Guin "was so good that the mainstream couldn't dismiss SF any more". According to scholar Donna White, Le Guin was a "major voice in American letters", whose writing was the subject of many volumes of literary critique, more than two hundred scholarly articles, and a number of dissertations.

Le Guin was unusual in receiving most of her recognition for her earliest works, which remained her most popular; a commentator in 2018 described a "tendency toward didacticism" in her later works, while John Clute, writing in The Guardian, stated that her later writing "suffers from the need she clearly felt to speak responsibly to her large audience about important things; an artist being responsible can be an artist wearing a crown of thorns". Not all of her works received as positive a reception; The Compass Rose was among the volumes that had a mixed reaction, while the Science Fiction Encyclopedia described The Eye of the Heron as "an over-diagrammatic political fable whose translucent simplicity approaches self-parody". Even the critically well-received The Left Hand of Darkness, in addition to critique from feminists, was described by Alexei Panshin as a "flat failure".

Her writing was recognized by the popular media and by commentators. The Los Angeles Times commented in 2009 that after the death of Arthur C. Clarke, Le Guin was "arguably the most acclaimed science fiction writer on the planet", and went on to describe her as a "pioneer" of literature for young people. In an obituary, Clute described Le Guin as having "presided over American science fiction for nearly half a century", and as having a reputation as an author of the "first rank". In 2016, The New York Times described her as "America's greatest living science fiction writer". Praise for Le Guin frequently focused on the social and political themes her work explored, and for her prose; literary critic Harold Bloom described Le Guin as an "exquisite stylist", saying that in her writing, "Every word was exactly in place and every sentence or line had resonance". According to Bloom, Le Guin was a "visionary who set herself against all brutality, discrimination, and exploitation". The New York Times described her as using "a lean but lyrical style" to explore issues of moral relevance. Prefacing an interview in 2008, Vice magazine described Le Guin as having written "some of the more mind-warping [science fiction] and fantasy tales of the past 40 years".

Le Guin's fellow authors also praised her writing. After Le Guin's death in 2018, writer Michael Chabon referred to her as the "greatest American writer of her generation", and said that she had "awed [him] with the power of an unfettered imagination". Author Margaret Atwood hailed Le Guin's "sane, smart, crafty and lyrical voice", and wrote that social injustice was a powerful motivation through Le Guin's life. Her prose, according to Zadie Smith, was "as elegant and beautiful as any written in the twentieth century". Academic and author Joyce Carol Oates highlighted Le Guin's "outspoken sense of justice, decency, and common sense", and called her "one of the great American writers and a visionary artist whose work will long endure". China Miéville described Le Guin as a "literary colossus", and wrote that she was a "writer of intense ethical seriousness and intelligence, of wit and fury, of radical politics, of subtlety, of freedom and yearning".

=== Awards and recognition ===
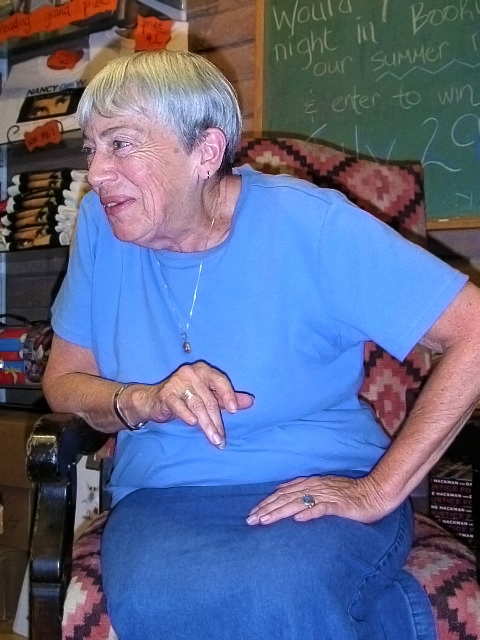
Le Guin at a "meet the author" event in 2004

The accolades Le Guin has received include numerous annual awards for individual works. She won eight Hugo Awards from twenty-six nominations, and six Nebula Awards from eighteen nominations, including four Nebula Awards for Best Novel from six nominations, more than any other writer. Locus Magazine subscribers have voted Le Guin to receive 25 Locus Awards. At the time of her death she was third for total wins, as well as second behind Neil Gaiman for awards for fiction. For her novels alone she won five Locus Awards, four Nebula Awards, two Hugo Awards, and one World Fantasy Award, and won each of those awards in short fiction categories as well. Her third Earthsea novel, The Farthest Shore, won the 1973 National Book Award for Young People's Literature, and she was a finalist for ten Mythopoeic Awards, nine in Fantasy and one for Scholarship. Her 1996 collection Unlocking the Air and Other Stories was one of three finalists for the 1997 Pulitzer Prize for Fiction. Other awards won by Le Guin include three James Tiptree Jr. Awards, and three Jupiter Awards. She won her final Hugo award a year after her death, for a complete edition of Earthsea, illustrated by Charles Vess; the same volume also won a Locus award.

Other awards and accolades have recognized Le Guin's contributions to speculative fiction. She was voted a Gandalf Grand Master Award by the World Science Fiction Society in 1979. The Science Fiction Research Association gave her its Pilgrim Award in 1989 for her "lifetime contributions to SF and fantasy scholarship". At the 1995 World Fantasy Convention she won the World Fantasy Award for Life Achievement, a judged recognition of outstanding service to the fantasy field. The Science Fiction and Fantasy Hall of Fame inducted her in 2001, its sixth class of two deceased and two living writers. The Science Fiction and Fantasy Writers of America named her its 20th Grand Master in 2003: she was the second, and at the time of death one of only six, women to receive that honor. In 2013, she was given the Eaton Award by the University of California, Riverside, for lifetime achievement in science fiction.

External videos
- Neil Gaiman presenting the Medal for Distinguished Contribution to American Letters to Le Guin at the National Book Awards, November 19, 2014, C-SPAN

Later in her career Le Guin also received accolades recognizing her contributions to literature more generally. In April 2000, the U.S. Library of Congress named Le Guin a Living Legend in the "Writers and Artists" category for her significant contributions to America's cultural heritage. The American Library Association granted her the annual Margaret Edwards Award in 2004, and also selected her to deliver the annual May Hill Arbuthnot Lecture. The Edwards Award recognizes one writer and a particular body of work: the 2004 panel cited the first four Earthsea volumes, The Left Hand of Darkness and The Beginning Place. The panel said that Le Guin "has inspired four generations of young adults to read beautifully constructed language, visit fantasy worlds that inform them about their own lives, and think about their ideas that are neither easy nor inconsequential". A collection of Le Guin's works was published by the Library of America in 2016, an honor only rarely given to living writers. The National Book Foundation awarded Le Guin its Medal for Distinguished Contribution to American Letters in 2014, stating that she had "defied conventions of narrative, language, character, and genre, and transcended boundaries between fantasy and realism to forge new paths for literary fiction". The American Academy of Arts and Letters made her a member in 2017. On July 27, 2021, Le Guin was honored by the US Postal Service with the 33rd stamp in the Postal Service's Literary Arts series. The stamp features a portrait of the author taken from a 2006 photograph against a background image inspired by her book The Left Hand of Darkness. The stamp was designed by Donato Gionacola. A crater on the planet Mercury was named in Le Guin's honor in November 2024.

=== Legacy and influence ===
Le Guin had a considerable influence on the field of speculative fiction; Jo Walton argued that Le Guin played a large role in both broadening the genre and helping genre writers achieve mainstream recognition. The Earthsea books are cited as having a wide impact, including outside the field of literature. Margaret Atwood considers A Wizard of Earthsea one of the "wellsprings" of fantasy literature, and modern writers have credited the book for the idea of a "wizard school", later made famous by the Harry Potter series of books, and with popularizing the trope of a boy wizard, also present in Harry Potter. The notion that names can exert power is a theme in the Earthsea series; critics have suggested that this inspired Hayao Miyazaki's use of the idea in his 2001 film Spirited Away.

Le Guin's writings set in the Hainish universe also had a wide influence. Le Guin coined the name "ansible" for an instantaneous interstellar communication device in 1966; the term was later adopted by several other writers, including Orson Scott Card in the Ender Series and Neil Gaiman in a script for a Doctor Who episode. Suzanne Reid wrote that at the time The Left Hand of Darkness was written, Le Guin's ideas of androgyny were unique not only to science fiction, but to literature in general. That volume is specifically cited as leaving a large legacy; in discussing it, literary critic Harold Bloom wrote "Le Guin, more than Tolkien, has raised fantasy into high literature, for our time". Bloom followed this up by listing the book in his The Western Canon (1994) as one of the books in his conception of artistic works that have been important and influential in Western culture. This view was echoed in The Paris Review, which wrote that "No single work did more to upend the genre's conventions than The Left Hand of Darkness", while White argued that it was one of the seminal works of science fiction, as important as Mary Shelley's Frankenstein (1818).

Commentators have also described Le Guin as being influential in the field of literature more generally. Literary critic Elaine Showalter suggested that Le Guin "set the pace as a writer for women unlearning silence, fear, and self-doubt", while writer Brian Attebery stated that "[Le Guin] invented us: science fiction and fantasy critics like me but also poets and essayists and picture book writers and novelists". Le Guin's own literary criticism proved influential; her 1973 essay "From Elfland to Poughkeepsie" led to renewed interest in the work of Kenneth Morris, and eventually to the publication of a posthumous novel by Morris. Le Guin also played a role in bringing speculative fiction into the literary mainstream by supporting journalists and scholarly endeavors examining the genre.

Several prominent authors acknowledge Le Guin's influence on their own writing. Jo Walton wrote that "her way of looking at the world had a huge influence on me, not just as a writer but as a human being". Nebula Awards winner Neil Gaiman stated, "I learn more from her books at every stage of life than from any other writer." Other writers she influenced include Booker Prize winner Salman Rushdie, as well as David Mitchell, Algis Budrys, Kathleen Goonan, and Iain Banks. Mitchell, author of books such as Cloud Atlas, described A Wizard of Earthsea as having a strong influence on him, and said that he felt a desire to "wield words with the same power as Ursula Le Guin". Le Guin is also credited with inspiring several female science fiction authors in the 1970s, including Vonda McIntyre. When McIntyre established a writers' workshop in Seattle in 1971, Le Guin was one of the instructors. Film-maker Arwen Curry began production on a documentary about Le Guin in 2009, filming "dozens" of hours of interviews with the author as well as many other writers and artists who have been inspired by her. Curry launched a successful crowdfunding campaign to finish the documentary in early 2016 after winning a grant from the National Endowment for the Humanities.

The Ursula K. Le Guin Prize for Fiction was announced in October 2021. The award is managed by the Ursula K. Le Guin Literary Trust and a panel of jurors. The prize is worth US$25,000 and is awarded annually to "a single book-length work of imaginative fiction." The inaugural winner was Khadija Abdalla Bajaber for her book The House of Rust.

=== Adaptations of her work ===
Le Guin's works have been adapted for radio, film, television, and the stage. Her 1971 novel The Lathe of Heaven has been released on film twice, in 1979 by WNET with Le Guin's participation, and then in 2002 by the A&E Network. In a 2008 interview, she said she considered the 1979 version as "the only good adaptation to film" of her work to date. In the early 1980s Hayao Miyazaki asked to create an animated adaptation of Earthsea. Le Guin, who was unfamiliar with his work and anime in general, initially turned down the offer, but later accepted after seeing My Neighbor Totoro. The third and fourth Earthsea books were used as the basis of Tales from Earthsea, released in 2006. Rather than being directed by Hayao Miyazaki himself, the film was directed by his son Gorō, which disappointed Le Guin. Le Guin was positive about the aesthetic of the film, writing that "much of it was beautiful", but was critical of the film's moral sense and its use of physical violence, and particularly the use of a villain whose death provided the film's resolution. In 2004, the Sci Fi Channel adapted the first two books of the Earthsea trilogy as the miniseries Legend of Earthsea. Le Guin was highly critical of the miniseries, calling it a "far cry from the Earthsea I envisioned", objecting to the use of white actors for her red-, brown-, and black-skinned characters.

Le Guin's novel The Left Hand of Darkness was adapted for the stage in 1995 by Chicago's Lifeline Theatre. Reviewer Jack Helbig at the Chicago Reader wrote that the "adaptation is intelligent and well crafted but ultimately unsatisfying", in large measure because it is extremely difficult to compress a complex 300-page novel into a two-hour stage presentation. Paradises Lost was adapted into an opera by the opera program of the University of Illinois. The opera was composed by Stephen A. Taylor; the libretto has been attributed both to Kate Gale and to Marcia Johnson. Created in 2005, the opera premiered in April 2012. Le Guin described the effort as a "beautiful opera" in an interview, and expressed hopes that it would be picked up by other producers. She also said she was better pleased with stage versions, including Paradises Lost, than screen adaptations of her work to that date. In 2013, the Portland Playhouse and Hand2Mouth Theatre produced a play based on The Left Hand of Darkness, directed and adapted by Jonathan Walters, with text written by John Schmor. The play opened May 2, 2013, and ran until June 16, 2013, in Portland, Oregon. In 2025 Always Coming Home was adapted by F. Wiesel with Music by Jacob Bussmann at Theater & Orchester Heidelberg.

== Written works ==
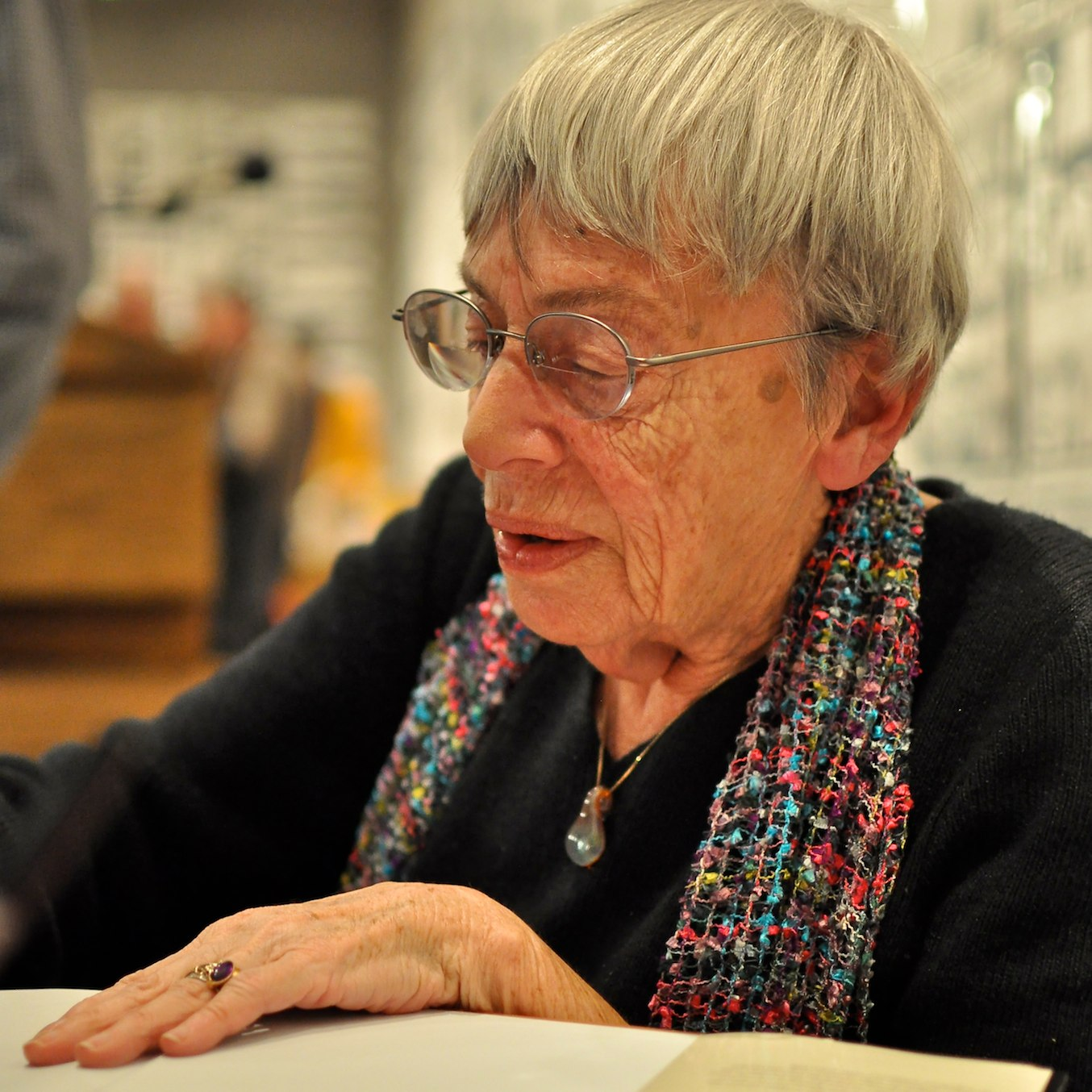
Le Guin signing a book in 2013

Le Guin's career as a professional writer spanned nearly sixty years, from 1959 to 2018. During this period, she wrote more than twenty novels, more than a hundred short stories, more than a dozen volumes of poetry, five translations, and thirteen children's books. Her writing encompassed speculative fiction, realistic fiction, non-fiction, screenplays, librettos, essays, poetry, speeches, translations, literary critiques, chapbooks, and children's fiction. Le Guin's first published work was the poem "Folksong from the Montayna Province" in 1959, while her first published short story was "An die Musik", in 1961. Her first professional publication was the short story "April in Paris" in 1962, while her first published novel was Rocannon's World, released by Ace Books in 1966. Her final publications included the non-fiction collections Dreams Must Explain Themselves and Ursula K Le Guin: Conversations on Writing, both released after her death. Her best-known works include the six volumes of the Earthsea series, and the many novels of the Hainish Cycle.

== See also ==
- List of American novelists
- List of fantasy authors
- List of science fiction authors

== Sources ==
- Bernardo, Susan M.; Murphy, Graham J. (2006). Ursula K. Le Guin: A Critical Companion. Greenwood Press. ISBN 978-0-313-33225-8.
- Bloom, Harold (1987). "Introduction". In Bloom, Harold (ed.). Modern Critical Interpretations: Ursula Le Guin's The Left Hand of Darkness. Chelsea House Publications. pp. 1–10. ISBN 978-1-55546-064-8.
- Cadden, Mike (2005). Ursula K. Le Guin Beyond Genre: Fiction for Children and Adults. Routledge. ISBN 978-0-415-99527-6.
- Cummins, Elizabeth (1990). Understanding Ursula K. Le Guin. University of South Carolina Press. ISBN 978-0-87249-687-3.
- Erlich, Richard D. (December 2009). Coyote's Song: The Teaching Stories of Ursula K. Le Guin. Wildside Press LLC. ISBN 978-1-4344-5775-2. Archived from the original on February 3, 2021.
- Kuznets, Lois R. (1985). "'High Fantasy' in America: A Study of Lloyd Alexander, Ursula Le Guin, and Susan Cooper". The Lion and the Unicorn. 9: 19–35. doi:10.1353/uni.0.0075. S2CID 143248850.
- Le Guin, Ursula (1978). The Wind's Twelve Quarters Volume I. Granada Publishing. ISBN 978-0-586-04623-4.
- Lindow, Sandra J. (2012). Dancing the Tao: Le Guin and Moral Development. Cambridge Scholars Publishing. ISBN 978-1-4438-4302-7.
- Lothian, Alexis (2006). "Grinding Axes and Balancing Oppositions: The Transformation of Feminisms in Ursula K. Le Guin's Science Fiction". Extrapolation. 47 (3): 380–395. doi:10.3828/extr.2006.47.3.4.
- Nicholls, Peter; Clute, John; Sleight, Graham, eds. (April 7, 2018). "Le Guin, Ursula K.". The Encyclopedia of Science Fiction. Gollancz. Archived from the original on April 26, 2018.
- Reid, Suzanne Elizabeth (1997). Presenting Ursula Le Guin. Twayne. ISBN 978-0-8057-4609-9.
- Rochelle, Warren (2001). Communities of the Heart: The Rhetoric of Myth in the Fiction of Ursula K. Le Guin. Liverpool University Press. ISBN 978-0-85323-876-8.
- Rochelle, Warren G. (2008). "Ursula K. Le Guin". A Companion to Science Fiction. John Wiley & Sons. pp. 408–419. ISBN 978-1-4051-4458-2. Archived from the original on July 7, 2014.
- Slusser, George Edgar (1976). The Farthest Shores of Ursula K. Le Guin. Wildside Press LLC. ISBN 978-0-89370-205-2.
- Spivack, Charlotte (1984). Ursula K. Le Guin. Twayne Publishers. ISBN 978-0-8057-7393-4.
- Tymn, Marshall B. (1981). The Science fiction reference book. Starmont House. ISBN 978-0-916732-49-3.
- White, Donna (1999). Dancing with Dragons: Ursula K. Le Guin and the Critics. Camden House. ISBN 978-1-57113-034-1.
