= From Elfland to Poughkeepsie =

1972 speech by Ursula K. Le Guin

"From Elfland to Poughkeepsie" is a 1972 speech by Ursula K. Le Guin about writing style in fantasy. It was later published as a limited-edition standalone booklet by Pendragon Press in 1973 and later in a collection of essays, The Language of the Night, in 1979.

In her speech, Le Guin discusses the "awful responsibility" of writing fantasy, where "there is nothing but the writer's vision of the world" and this world is a "world where no voice has ever spoken before; where the act of speech is the act of creation. The only voice that speaks there is the creator's voice. And every word counts." Over the course of the speech, she distinguishes "the genuine, risky Inner Lands ('Elfland') from the banal imitation which is really the outside world in disguise ('Poughkeepsie')."

In her argument that fantastic creation should reach to the very words and grammar of fantasy writers, she holds up Lord Dunsany, E. R. Eddison, Kenneth Morris, J. R. R. Tolkien, James Branch Cabell, Evangeline Walton, and Jack Vance as successful examples.

The essay has become influential in fantasy critical theory and is frequently cited. The novelist Peter S. Beagle called it "the definitive piece on fantasy, and on why simply sprinkling goblins, magic swords, and assorted thees and thous through your story will not get you a step closer to that vast and beautiful realm."

== See also ==
- On Fairy-Stories, lecture and essay by J. R. R. Tolkien
- The Tough Guide to Fantasyland, book by Diana Wynne Jones
