= Charles Le Guin =

American historian

Charles Alfred Le Guin (1927 – January 4, 2025) was an American historian of France.

== Life ==
Le Guin was born in Macon, Georgia.

Partly of French ancestry, Le Guin was brought up in Macon, attending public schools and then Mercer University. His bachelor's degree, majoring in History and English Literature, was interrupted by service in the U.S. Navy, but, through the G.I. Bill, he was able to complete the degree and then take a master's degree in history at Northwestern University, graduating in December. He was then appointed to teach Western Civilisation at Syracuse University for the remainder of the year and the whole of the next. He proceeded to take up a scholarship at Emory University as the University's sixth doctoral student (and its first doctoral student in History), studying the French Revolution under the supervision of Joseph Mathews. In 1953 he travelled to Paris as a Fulbright Scholar; on the voyage he met Ursula K. Le Guin, marrying her a few months later. He completed his Ph.D. in 1957. He then took up a post at the University of Idaho before, in 1959, being appointed to Portland State College, where he worked until retirement in 1995 or 1996, becoming Professor Emeritus of History.

His son Theo remembered him as a "husband, father, friend, scholar, teacher, gifted gardener, deeply erudite of classical music and opera, first reader of most of Ursula's writing [...] a true hearted, true Human Being".

== Legacy ==
Ursula Le Guin dedicated The Left Hand of Darkness to Charles. He has also been thought to be an inspiration for Ursula Le Guin's early story "April in Paris", in which "a burnt-out professor on a year's leave in Paris finds it a distinct relief to time-travel to fifteenth-century Paris, where he meets the woman of his dreams".

On June 10, 2024, the Charles A. and Ursula K. Le Guin Writers Residency was established.

== Works ==
- Roland de la Platière; a public servant in the eighteenth century (Philadelphia: American Philosophical Society, 1966)
- A home-concealed woman: the diaries of Magnolia Wynn Le Guin, 1901-1913, edited by Charles A. Le Guin; foreword by Ursula K. Le Guin (Athens: University of Georgia Press, 1990)
- In the balance: themes in global history, ed. by Candice L. Goucher, Charles A. Le Guin, Linda A. Walton (Boston, Mass.: McGraw Hill, 1998)

== See also ==
- Historiography of the French Revolution
- List of historians
