= Aiken Drum =

Traditional Scottish song now a nursery rhyme

"Aiken Drum" (Roud 2571) also spelled "Aikendrum" is a popular Scottish folk song and nursery rhyme, which probably has its origins in a Jacobite song about the Battle of Sheriffmuir (1715). The lyrics typically concern a man who wears food as his clothes, with older versions involving another man who eats said food.

== Lyrics ==
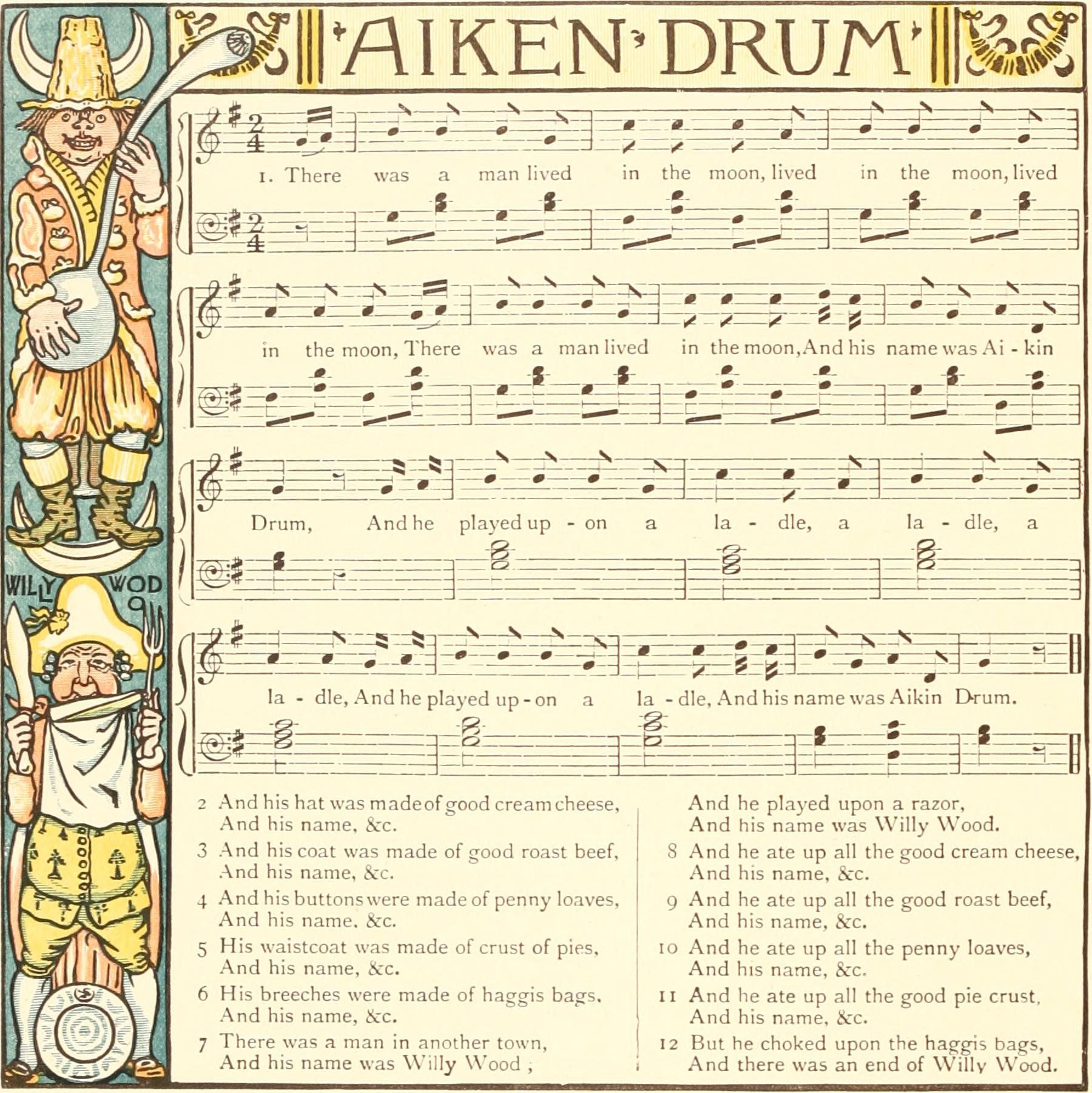
Lyrics from 1899

Modern versions of the lyrics include:

There was a man lived in the moon, lived in the moon, lived in the moon,
There was a man lived in the moon,
And his name was Aiken Drum.

Chorus
And he played upon a ladle, a ladle, a ladle,
And he played upon a ladle,
and his name was Aiken Drum.

And his hat was made of good cream cheese, of good cream cheese, of good cream cheese,
And his hat was made of good cream cheese,
And his name was Aiken Drum.

And his coat was made of good roast beef, of good roast beef, of good roast beef,
And his coat was made of good roast beef,
And his name was Aiken Drum.

And his buttons made of penny loaves, of penny loaves, of penny loaves,
And his buttons made of penny loaves,
And his name was Aiken Drum.

And his waistcoat was made of crust pies, of crust pies, of crust pies,
And his waistcoat was made of crust pies,
And his name was Aiken Drum.

And his breeches made of haggis bags, of haggis bags, of haggis bags,
And his breeches made of haggis bags,
And his name was Aiken Drum.

A more Scots version includes the lyrics:

His hat was made of guid cream cheese,
His coat was made of fine rost beef,
His buttons were made of bawbee baps [bread rolls costing a halfpenny each],
His breeks [breeches] were made of haggis bags.

Various versions give the man's name as Aiken Drum, Edrin Drum, Willy Wood and Billy Pod, with his location being either specified as "in the moon" or "in our town". His instrument he plays is either a ladle or a razor. They usually also have another man who eats the clothes of the first man and whose name is given as any of the other names listed before (for example if the first man's name is Aiken Drum then the second man's name is Willy Wood, if the first man's name is Billy Pod then the second man's name is Edrin Drum). One version has the second man die after choking on the haggis bags.

== Origins ==
"AIKEN DRUM." - We have been unable to obtain any satisfactory information regarding the origin of this air. Some persons consider it as one of the most ancient of our Scottish airs. We do not. In our boyhood it used to be sung to ludicrous but unmeaning stanzas, beginning-

"There lived a man in our town, In our town, in our town, There lived a man in our town, And his name was Aiken Drum."

We were told that this man wore a strange coat, with buttons of "bawbee-baps," and that "he played upon a razor." James Hogg, in the second series of his "Jacobite Relics," page 22, gives another "Aiken Drum," which he interprets politically with the aid of Sir Walter Scott-

"Ken ye how a Whig can fight, Aikendrum, Aikendrum?" &c.

The air to which these political stanzas are set is quite different from the air here given, with words written for it by a friend of the Publishers. Hogg quotes also the first stanza of another Aiken Drum, in which that personage is said to have come from the moon. In Mr. R. Chambers' "Popular Rhymes of Scotland," there is a vigorous ballad of thirty stanzas about another Aiken Drum, called "The Brownie of Blednock," written by William Nichol-son, & Dumfriesshire peasant. Another song to this air, beginning, "A piper came to our town," will be found in the Appendix.

— George Farquhar Graham, The Songs of Scotland, Adapted to Their Appropriate Melodies, Arranged with Pianoforte Accompaniments, Volume 3, 1849, p. 27

The rhyme was first printed by James Hogg in Jacobite Reliques in 1820, as a Jacobite song about the Battle of Sheriffmuir (1715)

Ken ye how a Whig can fight, Aikendrum, Aikendrum
Ken ye how a Whig can fight, Aikendrum
He can fight the hero bright, with his heels and armour tight
And the wind of heavenly night, Aikendrum, Aikendrum
Is not Rowley in the right, Aikendrum!
Did ye hear of Sunderland, Aikendrum, Aikendrum
Did ye hear of Sunderland, Aikendrum
That man of high command, who has sworn to clear the land
He has vanished from our strand, Aikendrum, Aikendrum,
Or the eel has ta'en the sand, Aikendrum.
Donald's running 'round and 'round, Aikendrum, Aikendrum,
Donald's running 'round and 'round, Aikendrum
But the Chief cannot be found, and the Dutchmen they are drowned
And King Jaime he is crowned, Aikendrum, Aikendrum
But the dogs will get a stound, Aikendrum.
We have heard of Whigs galore, Aikendrum, Aikendrum
We have heard of Whigs galore, Aikendrum
But we've sought the country o'er, with cannon and claymore,
And still they are before, Aikendrum, Aikendrum
We may seek forevermore, Aikendrum!
Ken ye how to gain a Whig, Aikendrum, Aikendrum
Ken ye how to gain a Whig, Aikendrum
Look Jolly, blythe and big, take his ain blest side and prig,
And the poor, worm-eaten Whig, Aikendrum, Aikendrum
For opposition's sake you will win!

Sir Walter Scott in his novel The Antiquary (1816) refers to Aiken Drum in a story told by an old beggar about the origins of what has been perceived by the protagonist as a Roman fort. The beggar tells him that it was actually built by him and others for "auld Aiken Drum's bridal" and that one of the masons cut the shape of a ladle into the stone as a joke on the bridegroom. The reference suggests that the rhyme, and particularly the chorus, was well enough known in the early nineteenth century for the joke to be understood.

== Performances ==
One version of a melody for "Aiken Drum"

The Scottish folk group The Singing Kettle performs this song for children in an interactive way by allowing the children to decide the foods of which Aiken Drum is made. Aiken Drum is then devoured by a figure called "Mr. Greedyguts". A version is included on their CD Singalong Songs from Scotland, produced in 2003 for Smithsonian Folkways Recordings.

Popular Armenian-Canadian children's singer Raffi played a version of the song, called "Aikendrum", on his album Singable Songs for the Very Young (1976). Raffi's version of the song replaces the various foods with ones that would be more familiar to an American audience: spaghetti for Aikendrum's hair, meatballs for his eyes, cheese for his nose, and pizza for his mouth. Starting from season 1 episode 5 in 1992, this version would be featured on Barney & Friends.

The album Classic Scots Ballads (1961) by Ewan MacColl and Peggy Seeger includes a recording of this song with the original lyrics.

English singer Martin Carthy performed a version of this song on the direct to VHS video 70 Golden Nursery Rhymes (1982) and the soundtrack album released during the same year. Carthy's version of the song features the traditional lyrics (cream cheese for his hat, roast beef for his coat, penny loaves for his buttons and crusts of pies for his vest) but substitutes the haggis-bag breeches for spaghetti hair taken from the Raffi version.

== The Brownie of Blednoch ==
Aiken Drum is also the name given by the Scottish poet William Nicholson to the brownie in his poem "The Brownie of Blednoch" (1828). The poem incorporates traditional brownie legends, but there is no evidence of the name being used for a brownie prior to Nicholson.

== In popular culture ==
One of the main characters in the Pliocene Exile series by Julian May, the Nonborn King, is called Aiken Drum, a "test tube baby" of uncertain parentage, named for the hero of the folk songs.
