= Stephen Bradbury (artist) =

British painter and illustrator

- Born: 1954 (age 71–72); Ardwick, Manchester, England
- Education: Marple Hall Grammar School, 1972; Bolton College of Art, 1973; Loughborough College of Art, 1974; Falmouth College of Art
- Known for: illustration, oil painting
- Spouse: Sue Goodricke (1973–present)
- Awards: Robert Fairthurst Prize, 1973; Pan Books Artist of the Year, 1982

Stephen Bradbury (born 1954) is a British artist and illustrator, illustrating science fiction and fantasy novels for over 20 years.

== Biography ==
It was on his journey from his home in Cheshire, as a student to Bolton College of Art everyday that initially brought alive his interest in illustration and detailed paintings. After getting off the train at Manchester Piccadilly, he would cross town to get the train from Manchester Victoria to Bolton. Often though, en route he would call into Manchester Art Gallery and look at the extensive collection of Pre-Raphaelite paintings.

=== Commercial illustrator ===
In 1982, he was commissioned by art director Gary Day Ellison at Pan Books to illustrate his first book cover, The Many Coloured Land by science-fiction writer Julian May. This was book one of Saga of Pliocene Exile series; other books in the series being The Golden Torc, The Nonborn King, and The Adversary. This was followed by the same author's Galactic Milieu Series: Jack The Bodiless, Diamond Mask, and Magnificat, where the author amazingly looped the story back to the start of the first book. Bradbury managed to pull off the same trick with the cover artwork. The success of the first series of books and Bradbury's distinctive artwork helped catapult his illustration career; and in 1982, he was awarded the Pan Books Artist of the Year award.

In 1996, Paper Tiger Books published Reflections: The Art of Stephen Bradbury. Written by David J. Howe, the book contains well over 150 examples of Bradbury's book cover illustrations and private artwork, and gives an exclusive look into his working methods and motivations. (This was to be one of the great ironies of his career, in being that, Paper Tiger was the first publisher he approached at the start of his career, and they rejected him outright. Years later, he got a phone call from them, asking whether they could do a book about him.)

=== Fine art painter ===
As part of this process, Bradbury took a degree in The History of Modern Art at Falmouth College of Art. After achieving his degree, he started on a major series of oil paintings, which was to become The Facets Project, consisting of 50 canvases and taking five years to complete.
