= Bioship =

Type of fictional spacecraft or starship made of biological elements

A bioship is a type of spacecraft or starship described in science fiction as either predominantly or totally composed of biological components, rather than being constructed from manufactured materials. Because of this, they nearly always have a distinctly organic look.

Bioships are usually quite powerful, and can often regenerate or heal damaged parts. Some bioships are intelligent or sentient, and some are considered to be lifeforms. Like most organic beings, many bioships contain large amounts of "scaffolding" materials to keep their shape, such as the xylem in trees or bone and chitin in animals.

== In fiction ==
In the science fiction short story "Specialist" by Robert Sheckley, published in 1953 in Galaxy magazine, it is revealed that many galactic races are actually capable of symbiotic cooperation to become bioships, with each race forming a different part. Earth, apparently, is one of the planets inhabited by creatures that are supposed to function as FTL (faster than light) drives (Pushers), and, it is stated that all the conflicts and discontent of humanity are due to the fact that, while they have matured, they have nowhere to apply their true purpose. This story is perhaps the first mention of a bioship in science fiction.

In the 1966 short story "Jonah" ("Jonas" in French) by Gérard Klein, humanity uses massive (half a billion tons each) bioships called ubionasts (Units of Biological Navigation over Starways). The protagonist, a microgravity-born human named Richard Mecca, makes a living by taming "snarks", ubionasts that went out of control for some reason.

Volume 322 of the German Perry Rhodan magazine series, first published in November 1967, marks another very early appearance of the bioship concept in science fiction. The Dolans are powerful bioengineered combat spaceships that are grown from the same synthetic genetic material as their extraterrestrial commanders. Different types of bioships are a recurrent feature in later stages of the Perry Rhodan universe.

The Night's Dawn Trilogy: the Edenist Voidhawk and Mercenary Blackhawk are both advanced bioships (the latter being a genetic tailoring for combat of the former). Both types employ mental bonding to the captain. In the case of Voidhawks this is done by both the craft and captain gestating together and maintaining mental contact during their formative years. Blackhawks however are purchased as eggs and are bonded to the buyer who will become captain when the Blackhawk matures.

In the first novel of Julian May's Pliocene series, The Many-Colored Land (1982), the backstory of two races of alien refugees living in the Earth's Pliocene epoch describes their hard landing in a bioship. The bioship was emotionally bonded to one of the aliens (the "shipspouse") and sacrificed its own life to safely deliver its passengers to the planet surface.

In J. Michael Straczynski's sci-fi TV show Babylon 5, many of the First Ones used organic ships, like the Vorlon and Shadows races. Use of organic technology by these races signified their significant advancement over the younger races since their ships are very resilient, generate their own power, very maneuverable, have devastatingly powerful weapons (including variants that are capable of destroying planets), regenerate, and have a measure of intelligence.

In the popular science fiction franchise Star Trek several bioships appear. The Star Trek: The Next Generation episode "Tin Man" features a bioship as the main part of the plot. Species 8472 also has an enormous fleet of bioships which are able to go toe to toe with arguably the Federation's most malignant enemy, The Borg.

The Yuuzhan Vong race in the Star Wars Legends' New Jedi Order book series use a fleet of highly resilient bioengineered vessels during their invasion of the galaxy, ranging from fighter sized "coralskippers" to titanic worldships that house their entire population. These ships often function on par with their technological counterparts and are difficult to combat, using highly unconventional weaponry and means of propulsion.

In the fictional universe of Warhammer 40,000, an extragalactic race known as the tyranids (who swarm entire planets and consume all available biomass to reproduce and further spread to other planets) travel through the galaxy using giant organic bioships known as hive ships that transport the various types of the race inside. These ships travel in large numbers known as hive fleets and are often described as "tendrils" weaving into the galaxy from other galaxies they had previously devoured. Numerous hive fleets have been recorded in the 40K universe and have even been named, with the first recorded fleet designated as Hive Fleet Behemoth. The hive ships are described as serving their race as a whole and the individuals within a hive ship serving it as a single entity.

The Zerg alien race in the video game StarCraft traverse space via sentient, organic vessels called "Leviathan".

The Mass Effect series features a race of sentient starships called the Reapers that cause galactic-level mass extinction events every 50,000 years. The first game in the series centers around their vanguard Sovereign and their impending return, while the second game reveals that the Reapers are led by Harbinger, who is considered the oldest and most powerful of them all. They create more of their number by harvesting the genetic material and uploading the memories of organic species and use them to build a new Reaper in the image of the harvested species, which are then further developed into standardized exterior designs resembling cuttlefish or squid. The third game further reveals that the Reapers were created by an artificial intelligence which itself was made to preserve life at all costs after having determined that organic and synthetic life would inevitably destroy each other, and so created the Reapers in order to preserve them. The Leviathan downloadable content further elaborates on their origins and that their exteriors are based on the appearance of the Leviathans, an ancient aquatic race that created the AI.

Farscape's Moya is a female Leviathan transport vessel; a living sentient bio-mechanical space ship, who was once captured by the Peacekeepers. She escaped captivity along with the people imprisoned on her by the Peacekeepers. She has given birth to one offspring, a male by the name of Talyn.

The series Lexx centers around the titular bioship, The Lexx: 'the most powerful weapon of destruction in the two universes.'

In the last three installments of the novel series The Expanse, the Laconian Empire uses powerful combat spaceships that are grown rather than built. Unlike other bioships, however, they are not fully alive but based on self-replicating technology that results in similar shapes as biological life.

In Jordan Peele's sci-fi horror comedy film Nope (2022), a flying saucer-shaped UFO has been plaguing the prairies of Los Angeles County, California and abducting several horses and ejecting anything inorganic, disguising itself in a single unmoving cloud and deactivating any electronics with its an electromagnetic field. Over time, protagonists OJ and Emerald discover that the UFO is not a ship, but an actual independent alien organism, or a unique terrestrial flying cryptid, whom they dub Jean Jacket. Despite its resemblance to a flying saucer, Jean Jacket is not an actual ship and hosts no alien crew but instead is eating all the creatures it "abducts" and regurgitating anything like metal or wood, including the liquefied prey if it is unable to process it. Near the end of the movie, it unfurls into a flimsy but massive jellyfish shape with a single square eye resembling a camera shutter.

== See also ==
- Astrochicken
- Dyson tree
- Space animal hypothesis
- LignoSat
