= 1982 in science fiction =

The year 1982 was marked, in science fiction, by the following events.

== Births and Deaths ==
=== Births ===
- Aliette de Bodard

=== Deaths ===
- Philip K. Dick

== Literary Releases ==
=== Novels ===
- 2010: Odyssey Two by Arthur C. Clarke
- Battlefield Earth by L. Ron Hubbard
- Foundation's Edge by Isaac Asimov
- The Running Man by Stephen King (published under the name Richard Bachman)

=== Short stories ===
- Burning Chrome by William Gibson

=== Comics ===
- Akira, by Katsuhiro Otomo, begins serialization in Weekly Young Magazine
- The first Dreadstar story, by Jim Starlin, is published in Epic Illustrated
- Nausicaä of the Valley of the Wind, by Hayao Miyazaki, begins serialization in Animage
- The Rocketeer, by Dave Stevens, first appears as a backup feature to Starslayer, published by Pacific Comics

== Movies ==
- Blade Runner, dir. by Ridley Scott
- E.T. The Extra-Terrestrial, dir. by Steven Spielberg
- Star Trek II: The Wrath of Khan, dir. by Nicholas Meyer
- The Thing, dir. by John Carpenter
- Tron, written and dir. by Steven Lisberger

== Television ==
- Interster premiered in South Africa

== Video Games ==
- Moon Patrol by Takashi Nishiyama
- Robotron: 2084 by Eugene Jarvis and Larry DeMar

== Awards ==
=== Hugo Awards ===
- Best Novel: Downbelow Station by C. J. Cherryh
- Best Novella: "The Saturn Game" by Poul Anderson
- Best Novelette: "Unicorn Variation" by Roger Zelazny
- Best Short Story: "The Pusher" by John Varley
- Best Related Work: Danse Macabre by Stephen King
- Best Dramatic Presentation: Raiders of the Lost Ark, dir. by Steven Spielberg; Screenplay by Lawrence Kasdan; story by George Lucas and Philip Kaufman
- Best Professional Editor: Edward L. Ferman
- Best Professional Artist: Michael Whelan
- Best Fanzine: Locus, ed. by Charles N. Brown
- Best Fan Writer: Richard E. Geis
- Best Fan Artist: Victoria Poyser

=== Nebula Awards ===
- Best Novel No Enemy But Time by Michael Bishop
- Best Novella: "Another Orphan" by John Kessel
- Best Novelette: " Fire Watch" by Connie Willis
- Best Short Story: "A Letter from the Clearys by Connie Willis

=== Other Awards ===
- BSFA Award for Best Novel: Helliconia Spring by Brian W. Aldiss
- Locus Award for Best Science Fiction Novel: The Many Colored Land by Julian May
- Saturn Award for Best Science Fiction Film: E.T. The Extra-Terrestrial
