= Heather King =

American writer

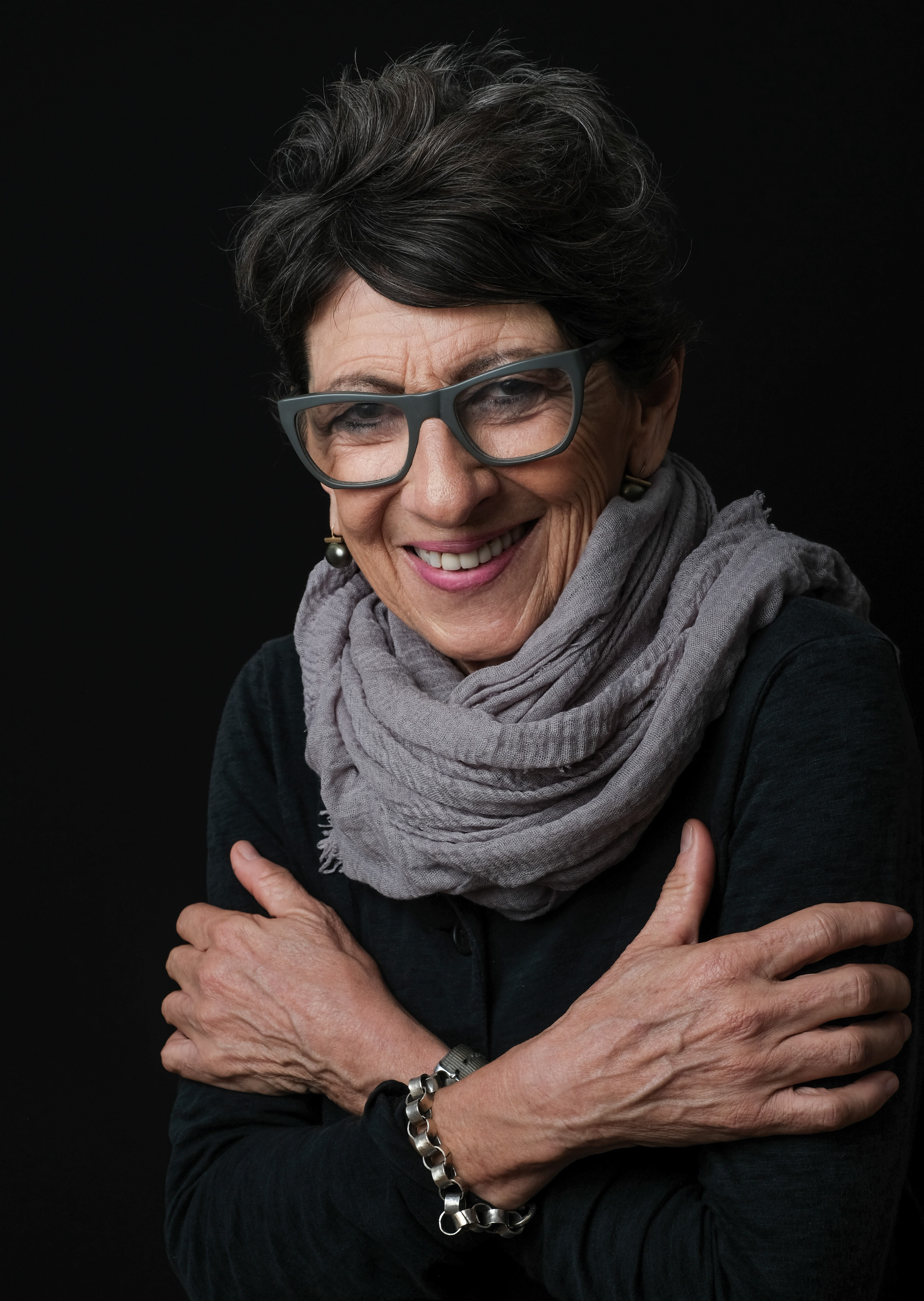
- Born: 1952 (age 73–74); Portsmouth, New Hampshire
- Occupations: Author, Columnist, Speaker
- Notable work: PARCHED, SHIRT OF FLAME, HOLY DESPERATION
- Website: heather-king.com

Heather King (born 1952) is a Los Angeles-based writer, blogger and speaker. Raised on the coast of New Hampshire, she struggled with alcoholism—a period during which she made the ill-advised decision to attend law school—sobered up in 1987, quit her job as an attorney, and converted to Catholicism in 1996.

She has written and recorded several slice-of-life commentaries for National Public Radio's All Things Considered and is the author of numerous essays and several memoirs.

King is a graduate of the University of New Hampshire (1977) and Suffolk University Law School (1984, cum laude).

She lives in Los Angeles where she maintains the blog HEATHER KING: DESIRE LINES. She contributes the monthly column "Credible Witnesses" to the Catholic magazine Magnificat. Her essays in Magnificat, among them "The Sacred Heart of Jesus," have won many awards from the Catholic Press Association [CPA].

Since May, 2014, she has written a weekly column on arts, culture, faith and life called [ "Desire Lines"] for ANGELUS, the archdiocesan newspaper of LA. Her subjects range from noir crime novelist Raymond Chandler to classical pianist Glenn Gould, outsider art, the secret staircases of Silver Lake, obsessive gardeners, opera, ballet, tightrope walking, and coke-addicted figure-skaters.

The column received First Place in the Best Weekly Column on Culture and the Arts from the Catholic Media Association (formerly the Catholic Press Association) in 2017, 2020, 2021, and 2022.

Parched, King's memoir about addiction as spiritual thirst, was chosen as a "Most Memorable Memoir" by Publishers Weekly in their "Year in Books" 2005, and was selected by "The Fix" as one of their Top Ten Addiction Memoirs.

Her book Holy Desperation: Praying As If Your Life Depends On It won Book of the Year 2018 from the National Association of Catholic Publishers, as well as Third Place that same year in the "Best Spiritual Memoir" category.

Her essays have appeared in the Best American Spiritual Writing series, and honored in the Best American Essays series.

She has received writing fellowships from the Djerassi Artists Residency, the Dorland Mountain Arts Colony, the Helene Wurlitzer Foundation, and the Ucross Foundation.

== Bibliography ==
- Parched: A Memoir (May 31, 2005, Chamberlain Bros.; SBN|978-1-596-09081-1/ September 5, 2006, New American Library|NAL Trade; ISBN 978-0-451-22006-6).
- Redeemed: A Spiritual Misfit Stumbles Toward God, Marginal Sanity, and the Peace That Passes All Understanding (February 2008, Viking Press; ISBN 978-0-670-01863-5 / January 27, 2009, Penguin Books; ISBN 978-0-143-11506-9).
- Shirt of Flame: A Year with Saint Thérèse of Lisieux (October 1, 2011, Paraclete Press; ISBN 978-1-557-25808-3).
- Poor Baby: A Child of the 60's Looks Back on Abortion (August 22, 2012, Holy Hell Books; ISBN 978-1-479-16175-1).
- Holy Days and Gospel Reflections (December 9, 2013, Magnificat; ISBN 978-1-936-26090-4).
- Stripped: Cancer, Culture and the Cloud of Unknowing (January 16, 2017, Holy Hell Books; ISBN 978-1494964641 (Published from August 11, 2015 through December, 2016 by Loyola Press under the title "Stripped: At the Intersection of Cancer, Culture and Christ")).
- Stumble: Virtue, Vice, and the Space Between (March 6, 2015, Franciscan Media; ISBN 978-1-616-36814-2).
- Loaded: Money and the Spirituality of Enough (April 30, 2016, Franciscan Media; ISBN 978-1-616-36959-0).
- Holy Desperation: Praying as If Your Life Depends on It (April 1, 2017, Loyola Press; ISBN 978-0-829-44514-5).
- Ravished: Notes on Womanhood (April 15, 2019, Holy Hell Books; ISBN 978-0578439617).
- Fools for Christ: Fifty Divine Eccentric Artists, Martyrs, Stigmatists, and Unsung Saints (June 19, 2019, Holy Hell Books; ISBN 978-0578512822).
- Harrowed: Life Lessons from the Garden (September 21, 2020, Holy Hell Books; ISBN 978-0578747958).
