= Magnificat (novel) =

Third novel in the Galactic Milieu Series

Magnificat is a novel by Julian May published in 1996. It is the third novel in the Galactic Milieu Series.

== Plot summary ==
By the third book in the series, Marc has matured into a highly capable metapsychic and is regarded as a Paramount. Through manipulated dreams, Marc conceives an idea called 'Mental Man' which would create a new subspecies of Man called Homo [sapiens] summus. It would use selective breeding, surgical modification, mental training (through induced pain) and technological enhancement to create hundreds of humans with the powers — and disembodiment — of Marc's younger brother Jack. This project has been kept highly secret for several years, but peers and competitors of Marc begin to get suspicious. He develops several increasingly powerful CE devices. These amplify a human's inherent metapsychic ability by orders of magnitude. The CE device is discussed in the debates of the Concilium, and is deemed too dangerous to be generally used. Marc disagrees, his research continues in secret although outlawed, and culminates in devices capable of 600× amplification. Marc's increasing ambition draws him to side with a rebel faction of the Concillium — those that do not wish to join 'Unity' with the other races and therefore with the Galactic Mind itself. The rebel faction determinedly opposes this as they believe humans will lose their individuality and privacy and will become thralls to the other races.

By this time, only two out of the original five Hydra units remain, Parnell Remillard and Madeleine Remillard — Marc's cousin and sister (it is revealed that the Hydra heads were the unborn children present at the vigil around Victor, where Fury corrupted their infant minds). One wet night, Denis' favorite daughter, Anne Remillard — a staunch loyalist and advocate of Unity — visits Rogi's bookshop. She has deduced that Denis is Fury. Rogi doubts this but when Anne is attacked and nearly killed, he realises that he must inform Jack and Dorothea of the identity of Fury. The only opportune moment seems their upcoming wedding.

After Rogi divulges the information on Fury/Denis to Jack and Dorothea, the Remillard dynasty assembles in order to 'exorcise' Denis. Denis is tricked into making himself vulnerable, and they attempt to remove the Fury element of his psyche. This goes disastrously wrong, and Denis/Fury vanishes. He is later realised to have "D-Jumped" — teleported — a first for man and most aliens, although it is revealed in the Saga of the Pliocene Exile that the Shipspouses of Lene had this ability.

Marc, previously totally chaste, falls madly in love with Cyndia Muldowney, the daughter of Rory, an opponent of Paul's, and the two marry.

After several events, Denis manages to briefly gain control from his Fury persona, and communicates with Cyndia. He reveals that the Mental Man babies (which were created from Marc and Madeleine's sperm and eggs) have become hundreds of Hydra by Madeleine's influence. Denis D-Jumps inside the complex and destroys all the children. Marc is dumbstruck, yet finds a way to terminate the Hydra-infested project while retaining the possibility of a new start. He mind-lasers Madeleine, aided by the CE, and has her frozen so that her ovaries may be used.

Denis travels to Mt. Washington, where he has manipulated Rogi using metapsychic coercion to journey to the summit. Bad weather hits the mountain and Rogi is shepherded into a shack by his nephew. Denis persuades Rogi to kill him with his yogic technique, as he fears Fury will regain control. None of his children could manage that even though they have strong metapsychic powers, because children seem to have a block against using their powers to attack their parents. And as Denis regards Rogi as a father figure, he hopes that Fury cannot use his powers against Rogi. Rogi feebly manages to start the technique but cannot muster the power. However, Fury does regain control and tries to kill Rogi physically, since the mental block against using metapsychic powers against parent figures does indeed apply. This act of violence gives Rogi the necessary desperation to trigger his operancy, and he vaporises Denis, to his great grief.

Marc in the meantime, continues his quest for Mental Man, but realises that the Metapsychic rebellion is too near for Mental Man to be present to ensure victory. Cyndia discovers Marc's plans, is horrified, and decides to remove all available sources of the new Mental Man. She acquires a sonic apparatus that will render Marc sterile, and triggers it by a telepathic command. However, Marc detects this impulse, realises what the device has done, and kills Cyndia by reflex.

Paul, father of Jack and Marc, is the leader of the Pro-Unity camp, and Jack decide to campaign against the rebels. As tension builds and several children start to co-adunate, the rebels' long-laid plans move into action. Marc has equipped hundreds of individuals with his CE devices, and his colleagues arm many ships. The rebels decide to demonstrate their power by destroying a planet — Molakar: the Krondaku planet from which the intervention was staged. Billions die in several seconds as the joined minds of the Rebels superheat the crust of the planet. A massive wave of metapsychic suffering and grief overwhelms the minds of the entire milieu. The response is not what Marc expects. Jack, Dorothea and his father, Paul, decide to confront him peacefully and will not let him take war to the galaxy. Marc decides to fight regardless, but the three pacifists call out to all the metapsychics in the galaxy to help join in Unity and stop the Rebels.

One of Marc's main allies is Patricia Castellane, the Dirigent (planetary leader) of the cosmopolitan planet Okanagon. During the attack, the rebels accidentally lose control of another explosive device and it explodes, setting off Okanagon's unstable crust. The resultant geological catastrophe kills the entire population of two billion people. Jack telepathically asks his once-idolized brother, "What have you done?!"

Jack and Dorothea manage to halt the rebel fleet, thanks to their ability to conjoin the powers of all the pro-Milieu operant humans. But these two and Paul die as a result. Many of the Rebels are also killed when their CEs overload, and Marc and a number of the leaders are badly hurt. The deaths of the people of Okanagon, however, propel humanity into the state of mental co-ordination (called "coadunation") which is the precursor to a benevolent joining of minds across the galaxy which the member races of the Milieu refer to as Unity.

After the rebel faction is defeated, their leaders flee through a unique one-directional gate in France 6 million years back in time, to the Pliocene period. They were aided by a Lylmik who was powerful enough even to freeze Marc in his tracks, as he had done many years previously when Marc was a boy. There they stay in exile, and the events of the Saga of Pliocene Exile take place. Marc Remillard survives all those years (thanks to his "immortality gene", a trait shared by most members of the Remillard clan in differing degrees) and eventually evolves to the 3rd stage of mental evolution, where he brings purpose to the Lylmik to create the milieu. He thoroughly repents of his great evil, and becomes the enlightened leader of the same galactic society that starts the intervention, calling himself Atoning Unifex. Marc is evidently the Lylmik who appeared to his past self, and turns out to be the incorporeal "Family Ghost" who appears to Rogi for several years, driving him to finish his memoirs as a unique document of the Metapsychic rebellion. Marc, according to the family tree, passes on to the next stage of existence / evolution leaving Rogi to be healed and back in a relationship with Elaine. Some of the Lylmik have human bodies now as well and the future of what happens next is, as yet, unknown.

== Reception ==
Paul Pettengale reviewed Magnificat for Arcane magazine, rating it a 9 out of 10 overall. Pettengale comments that "The book is unrelenting in its pace, as May hurries to get down everything that the reader wants to see happen, and yet it never becomes overly rushed."

== Reviews ==
- Review by Faren Miller (1996) in Locus, #423 April 1996
- Review by Chris Togenza (1996) in SFX, July 1996
- Review by Ken Brown (1996) in Interzone, #109 July 1996
- Review by Andrew A. Adams [as by Andrew Adams] (1997) in Vector 194
