= Magnifica =

Magnifica may refer to:

- Mitra magnifica, a sea snail species
- Myristica magnifica, a plant species endemic to India
- Magnifica 70, a 2015 Brazilian drama TV series

== See also ==
- La Magnifica, Mexican professional wrestler
- Magnificat (disambiguation)
