= Mike Aquilina =

American author and editor

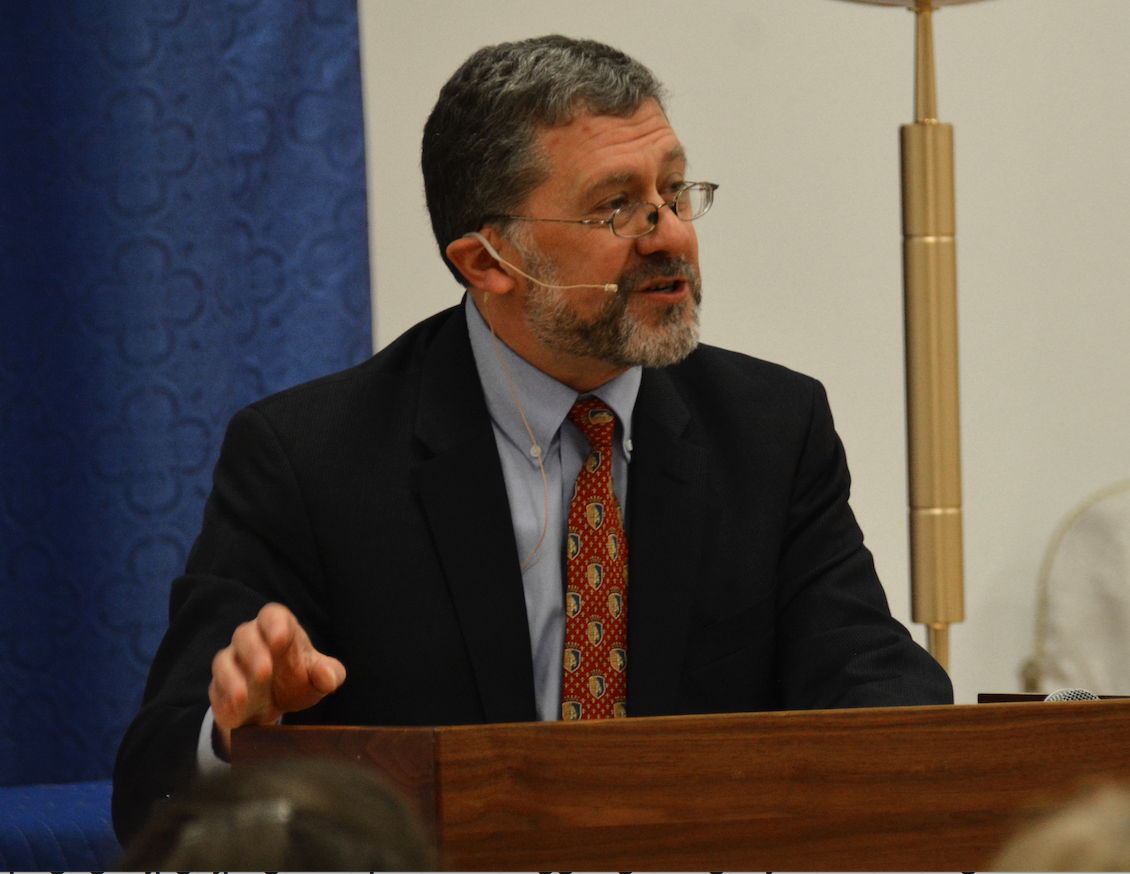
- Aquilina, 2019
- Born: Kingston, Pennsylvania, United States
- Education: Pennsylvania State University
- Occupations: Author, editor, poet, songwriter, speaker
- Organizations: Angelus
- Spouse: Terri
- Website: www.mikeaquilina.com

Mike Aquilina is an American Catholic author and journalist working in the area of Church history, especially patristics. He is co-founder of the St. Paul Center for Biblical Theology, a Catholic research center based in Steubenville, Ohio.

Aquilina is also a contributing editor of Angelus, and general editor of the Reclaiming Catholic History series from Ave Maria Press. He launched Way of the Fathers, a podcast produced by CatholicCulture.org, and hosted its first ninety-nine episodes.

== Early life and education ==
Aquilina was born in Kingston, Pennsylvania in 1963. He received his elementary and secondary education in Catholic schools in Pittston, Pennsylvania. He is a 1985 graduate of Pennsylvania State University, and he received that university's Oswald Award for Achievement in Journalism and Mass Media.

== Professional career ==
Aquilina is the author or editor of more than seventy books, including: What Catholics Believe (1999), Living the Mysteries (2003), The Fathers of the Church (2006), The Mass of the Early Christians (2007) and The Resilient Church (2007). His books have been translated into many languages, from Croatian and Portuguese to German and Braille. The Grail Code has appeared in ten languages since its publication in 2006.

Critics have praised Aquilina's work for making the Fathers accessible to non-academic readers: "Most scholars … study the paper trail — homilies, letters, teaching manuals, works of theological disputation … Aquilina loves the words, too. But he also finds the sermon in the stuff, the theology expressed in the little things that the first Christians left behind — fading murals on catacomb walls, pottery and dishware, pieces of coinage, ancient hymns and mass prayers, common household items … The point is that for Aquilina, the little things matter — because they tell us big things about what Catholics believe and how they look at the world". Dr. John Grondelski said in the National Catholic Register: "Aquilina has made a vocation and career out of, in many ways, single-handedly popularizing patristics."

Aquilina's book Ministers and Martyrs (2015), was an official companion volume to the NBC series A.D. The Bible Continues. A year later, he published The World of Ben-Hur, as a guide to MGM's remake of the Lew Wallace classic Ben-Hur.

Aquilina is also a poet and songwriter. His poems, collected in the volumes Terms and Conditions (2014) and The Invention of Zero (2020), have appeared in U.S. literary journals and in Polish and Spanish translations. His collaborations with Rock and Roll Hall of Fame artist Dion include the book Dion: The Wanderer Talks Truth (Stories, Humor & Music) and six albums: Tank Full of Blues (2012), New York Is My Home (2016), Blues with Friends (2020), Stomping Ground (2021), Girl Friends (2024), and The Rock 'n' Roll Philosopher (2025). The title song of New York Is My Home was recorded as a duet by Dion and Paul Simon, launched by Rolling Stone magazine, and released as a single in 2015. It was used in episode 5 of season 1, in the drama series Horace and Pete. It was also chosen by clothing designer Ralph Lauren, as the catwalk theme for his 50th-anniversary show in 2018. The song also appears in the Deluxe Edition of Simon's album Stranger to Stranger.

Dion's album Blues with Friends (2020) via KTBA Records, which included twelve songs co-written with Aquilina, debuted at No. 1 on Billboard and U.K. charts. It was also the No. 1 Billboard Blues Album for 2020. American Songwriter magazine honored "Song for Sam Cooke (Here in America)", a single from Blues with Friends, as the "Greatest of the Great 2020 Songs". DiMucci-Aquilina songs have also been recorded with or performed by Van Morrison, Bruce Springsteen, Jeff Beck, Amy Grant, Mark Knopfler, Joe Bonamassa, Brian Setzer, Joe Louis Walker, Billy F. Gibbons, Peter Frampton, Rickie Lee Jones, and many others. Bob Dylan praised these songs for their craft. Aquilina also co-wrote songs for Dion's No. 1 blues album Stomping Ground (2021).

In recent years, Aquilina has hosted eleven television series on EWTN and hosted two independently produced feature documentaries, one on St. Perpetua and another on St. Augustine. He is a frequent guest commentator on Catholic radio, especially Relevant Radio and EWTN. His journalistic work has appeared in many periodicals.

Aquilina is the past editor of New Covenant magazine (1996–2002) and Pittsburgh Catholic newspaper (1993–1996).

Since 2023 he has been board chair of the International Poetry Forum.

== Personal life ==
He and his wife, Terri, have been married since 1985. They live in the suburbs of Pittsburgh with their children, who are the subject of his book Love in the Little Things (2007).

== Bibliography ==
- The Church Fathers for Our Time (2026), ISBN 978-1-6458-5585-9
- The Mass of the Early Christians (2001/2007/2025), ISBN 978-1-6396-6387-3
- Rabbles, Riots, and Ruins: Twelve Ancient Cities and How They Were Evangelized (2024), ISBN 978-1-62164-678-5
- Feasts of Our Fathers: Praying the Church Year with the Early Christians (co-author with Adam Lucas) (2024), ISBN 978-1-6835-7340-1
- St. Patrick and His World (2024), ISBN 978-1-5941-7504-6
- Fathers of the Faith: Saint Athanasius (2023), ISBN 978-1-681-9-2397-0
- Fathers of the Faith: Saint John Chrysostom (2023), ISBN 978-1-6819-2540-0
- Africa and the Early Church: The Almost-Forgotten Roots of Catholic Christianity (2023), ISBN 978-1-6458-5259-9
- Rhymes' Reasons (2022), ISBN 978-1-5941-7454-4
- Fathers of the Faith: Saint Augustine (2022), ISBN 978-1-6819-2707-7
- Fathers of the Faith: Saint Irenaeus (2022), ISBN 978-1-6819-2705-3
- How the Fathers Read the Bible: Scripture, Liturgy, and the Early Church (2022), ISBN 978-1-6458-5170-7
- Friendship and the Fathers: How the Early Church Evangelized (2021), ISBN 978-1-6458-5112-7
- The Holy Mass: Sayings of the Fathers of the Church (2021), ISBN 978-0-8132-3335-2
- St. Joseph and His World (2020), ISBN 978-1-5941-7393-6
- History's Queen: Exploring Mary's Pivotal Role from Age to Age (2020), ISBN 978-1-5947-1987-5
- The Invention of Zero: An Accumulation of Poems (2020), ISBN 978-1-7354-4040-8
- Work Play Love: How the Mass Changed the Life of the First Christians (2020), ISBN 978-1-6406-0425-4
- The Eucharist Foretold: The Lost Prophecy of Malachi (2019), ISBN 978-1-6458-5003-8
- The Church and the Roman Empire (301–490): Constantine, Councils, and the Fall of Rome (2019), ISBN 978-1-5947-1789-5
- How Christianity Saved Civilization: And Must Do So Again (co-author with James L. Papandrea) (2019), ISBN 978-1-6228-2719-0
- Villains of the Early Church: And How They Made Us Better Christians (2018), ISBN 978-1-9490-1306-1
- A Joyful Noise: Praying the Psalms with the Early Church (2017), ISBN 978-1-9477-9229-6
- The Healing Imperative: The Early Church and the Invention of Medicine as We Know It (2017), ISBN 978-1-9451-2569-0
- A History of the Church in 100 Objects (co-author with Grace Aquilina) (2017), ISBN 978-1-5947-1750-5
- The Apostles and Their Times (2017), ISBN 978-1-6228-2460-1
- How the Choir Converted the World: Through Hymns, With Hymns, and In Hymns (2016), ISBN 978-1-9451-2521-8
- The World of Ben-Hur (2016), ISBN 978-1-6228-2317-8
- Take Five: On the Job Meditations With St. Ignatius (co-author with Fr. Kris Stubna) (2008/2016), ISBN 1-59276-403-7
- Sharing Christ's Priesthood: A Bible Study for Catholics (2009/2016), ISBN 1-59276-678-1
- The How-To Book of Catholic Devotions (co-author with Regis J. Flaherty) (2016), ISBN 978-1-6127-8965-1
- Praying in the Presence of Our Lord: with St. Thomas Aquinas (2002/2016), ISBN 0-87973-958-4
- Something More Pastoral: The Mission of Bishop, Archbishop, and Cardinal Donald Wuerl (co-author with Ann Rodgers) (2015), ISBN 978-0-6925-8742-3
- Keeping Mary Close: Devotion to Our Lady through the Ages (co-author with Fr. Frederick Gruber) (2015), ISBN 978-1-6163-6874-6
- Ministers & Martyrs: The Ultimate Catholic Guide to the Apostolic Age (2015), ISBN 978-1-6228-2265-2
- Seven Revolutions: How Christianity Changed the World and Can Change It Again (co-author with James L. Papandrea) (2015), ISBN 978-0-8041-3896-3
- The Ancient Path: Old Lessons from the Church Fathers for a New Life Today (co-author with John Michael Talbot) (2015), ISBN 978-0-80413-995-3
- The Holy Land: A Guide for Pilgrims (co-author with Fr. Dave Halaiko) (2014), ISBN 978-1-50321-393-7
- The Feasts: How the Church Year Forms Us as Catholics (co-author with Cardinal Donald Wuerl) (2014), ISBN 978-0-80413-992-2
- Terms and Conditions: Assorted Poems, 1985-2014 (2014), ISBN 978-1-50069-859-1
- The Witness of Early Christian Women: Mothers of the Church (2014), ISBN 978-1-61278-802-9
- The Fathers of the Church: An Introduction to the First Christian Teachers (1999/2006/2013), ISBN 1-61278-561-1
- Good Pope, Bad Pope: Their Lives, Our Lessons (2013), ISBN 978-1-616366-28-5
- The Social Doctrine of the Catholic Church (2013), Midwest Theological Forum ISBN 978-1-936045-96-9
- The Fathers of the Church Bible (2013), ISBN 978-1-61278-611-7
- Saint Monica and the Power of Persistent Prayer (co-author with Mark W. Sullivan) (2013), ISBN 978-1-61278-563-9
- The Church: Unlocking the Secrets to the Places Catholics Call Home (co-author with Cardinal Donald Wuerl) (2013), ISBN 978-0-77043-551-6
- Faith of Our Fathers: Why the Early Christians Still Matter and Always Will (2012), ISBN 978-1-93715-587-2
- Yours Is the Church: How Catholicism Shapes Our World (2012), ISBN 978-1-61636-434-2
- A Year with the Angels: Daily Meditations with the Messengers of God (2011), ISBN 978-1-935302-52-0
- Understanding the Mass: 100 Questions, 100 Answers (2011), ISBN 978-0-86716-949-2
- Dion: The Wanderer Talks Truth (Stories, Humor & Music) (co-author with Dion DiMucci) (2011), ISBN 978-0-86716-999-7
- The Mass: The Glory, the Mystery, the Tradition (co-author with Cardinal Donald Wuerl) (2011), ISBN 978-0-307-71880-8
- The Doubter's Novena: Nine Steps to Trust with the Apostle Thomas (co-author with Christopher Bailey) (2010), ISBN 978-1-59276-596-6
- A Year With The Church Fathers: Patristic Wisdom for Daily Living (2010), ISBN 978-1-935302-35-3
- Take Five: Meditations with John Henry Newman (co-author with Fr. Juan Velez) (2010), ISBN 978-1-59276-800-4
- Roots of the Faith: From the Church Fathers to You (2010), ISBN 978-0-86716-938-6
- Sweet Gridlock: Selected Love Poems 1985-2010 (2010), ISBN 0-615-32163-1
- Why Me? When Bad Things Happen (2009), ISBN 1-59276-708-7
- Take Five: Meditations with Pope Benedict XVI (co-author with Fr. Kris Stubna) (2009), ISBN 1-59276-554-8
- Fire of God's Love: 120 Reflections on the Eucharist (2009), ISBN 0-86716-923-0
- Praying the Psalms with the Early Christians (co-author with Christopher Bailey) (2009), ISBN 1-59325-155-6
- Angels of God: The Bible, the Church and the Heavenly Hosts (2009), ISBN 0-86716-898-6
- Companion Guide to Pope Benedict's 'The Fathers' (2008), ISBN 1-59276-542-4
- Signs and Mysteries: Revealing Ancient Christian Symbols (2008), ISBN 1-59276-450-9
- Love in the Little Things: Tales of Family Life (2007), ISBN 0-86716-814-5
- The Resilient Church: The Glory, the Shame, & the Hope for Tomorrow (2007), ISBN 1-59325-104-1
- The Grail Code: Quest for the Real Presence (co-author with Christopher Bailey) (2006), ISBN 0-8294-2159-9
- The Great Life: Essays on Doctrine and Holiness in Honor of Father Ronald Lawler, O.F.M. Cap. (co-editor with Kenneth Ogorek) (2006), ISBN 1-931018-32-4
- Talking to Youth About Sexuality: A Parents' Guide (co-author with Fr. Kris Stubna) (1995/2006), ISBN 1-59276-310-3
- Living the Mysteries: A Guide for Unfinished Christians (co-author with Scott Hahn) (2003), ISBN 1-931709-12-2
- A Pocket Catechism for Kids (co-author with Fr. Kris Stubna) (2001), ISBN 0-87973-722-0
- The World's First Christmas: Jubilee 2000 (co-author with Regis J. Flaherty) (2000), ISBN 0-87973-314-4
- What Catholics Believe: A Pocket Catechism (co-author with Fr. Kris Stubna) (1999), ISBN 0-87973-574-0
- The Way of the Fathers: Praying With the Early Christians (1999), ISBN 0-87973-334-9
- Weapons of the Spirit: Selected Writings of Father John Hugo (co-editor with David Scott) (1997), ISBN 0-87973-608-9
