= Bladnoch =

Bladnoch may refer to:

- Bladnoch, Wigtownshire
- Bladnoch Distillery, and Bladnoch whisky
- River Bladnoch
