= William Nicholson (poet) =

Scottish poet

William Nicholson (1782–1849) was a Scottish poet, born in the village of Borgue in Kirkcudbrightshire. He was also known variously as "The Bard of Galloway", the itinerant singer and "pedlar-poet", or "Wandering Wull". His best writing makes distinctive use of his native Scots language and many of his works are in the form of song.

He was encouraged by James Hogg and Dr. Alexander Murray. Nicholson's published collections include Tales, in Verse, and Miscellaneous Poems: Descriptive of Rural Life and Manners (1814), a work which contains some 60 original poems, including "The Ghost of Crazy Jane", "The Fairy Dance", and "A Tale of Terror", a number of which have been anthologised. One common anthology piece sometimes associated with his name is also "The Aiken Drum".

He is best remembered today for "The Brownie of Blednoch" (1828), a favourite of the poet Marion Angus (1865–1946), and "The Braes of Galloway".
