= Angelus (magazine) =

Catholic magazine based in Los Angeles, California, US

- Cover of the July 1, 2016 issue
- Editor: Pablo Kay
- Frequency: weekly (except for Easter, Thanksgiving and Christmas)
- Publisher: Archbishop José H. Gómez
- Founded: 1895 (as newspaper The Tidings)
- Company: Roman Catholic Archdiocese of Los Angeles; The Tidings Corporation
- Country: United States
- Based in: Los Angeles, California
- Language: English
- Website: http://www.angelusnews.com/

Angelus (also called Angelus News) is a weekly Catholic magazine published jointly by The Tidings Corporation and the Archdiocese of Los Angeles, the most populous diocese in the United States.

The magazine began publication in 1895 as a newspaper named The Tidings and is the oldest continuously published Catholic periodical on the west coast of the United States. It is also the oldest weekly periodical in the Los Angeles market.

The last issue of The Tidings was published in June 2016; in July 2016, it was transformed into the multimedia news platform Angelus (aka Angelus News).

== Circulation and archives ==
The archdiocese reported that The Tidings reached 230,000 adult readers every week.

The newspaper's online archive was lost in the migration from the-tidings.com domain to the angelusnews.com domain.

== Writers ==
The magazine regularly or frequently features columns written by the following, among others:

- Archbishop José H. Gómez
- Kathryn Jean Lopez
- Mike Aquilina
- Rev. Ronald Rolheiser ("In Exile")
- Greg Erlandson
- Heather King ("The Crux")
- John L. Allen Jr.
- Robert Brennan
- Dr. Grazie Pozo Christie
- Bishop Robert Barron
- Scott Hahn ("Sunday Readings")

== Sources ==
- The Tidings: About The Tidings (archived at Internet Archive)
- The Tidings: Media Kit (archived at Internet Archive)
