= Magnificat (disambiguation) =

The Magnificat is a Christian canticle found in the Gospel of Luke.

Magnificat may also refer to:

== Settings of the canticle ==
- Magnificat in E-flat major, BWV 243a, a 1723 choral work by Johann Sebastian Bach
- Magnificat in D major, BWV 243, a 1733 choral work by J.S. Bach, based on the former
- Magnificat (C. P. E. Bach), a choral work by Carl Philipp Emanuel Bach
- Magnificat (Bruckner), a choral work by Anton Bruckner
- Magnificat, a choral work by Francesco Durante sometimes misattributed to Giovanni Battista Pergolesi
- Magnificat (Pärt), a choral work by Arvo Pärt
- Magnificat (Penderecki)
- Magnificat (Rutter), a choral work by John Rutter
- Magnificat (Schütz), compositions by Heinrich Schütz, four extant, two lost
- Magnificat (Schubert), a choral work by Franz Schubert
- Magnificat (Vaughan Williams), a 1932 composition for contralto, women's chorus and orchestra by Ralph Vaughan Williams
- Magnificat (Vivaldi), RV 610, 610a, 610b, 611, a work by Vivaldi

== Music ==
- Magnificat Baroque Ensemble, an American early-music ensemble
- Magnificat, an album by David and the Giants

== Schools ==
- Magnificat Academy, a Catholic middle school and high school in Warren, Massachusetts, U.S.
- Magnificat High School, an all-girls high school in Rocky River, Ohio, U.S.

== Other uses ==
- Magnificat (film), a 1993 Italian drama
- Magnificat (novel), a novel in the Galactic Milieu Series by Julian May

== See also ==
- Ballet Magnificat!
- Madonna of the Magnificat, a 1481 painting by Sandro Botticelli
- Magnificat Meal Movement
- Monasterium Magnificat
- Novus Magnificat, a 1986 album by Constance Demby
