= James L. Papandrea =

American academic and musician

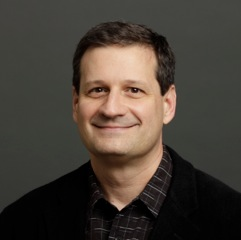
- James L. Papandrea
- Born: May 9, 1963 (age 63); Madison, Wisconsin
- Occupations: Catholic theologian, historian, and musician
- Website: https://jimpapandrea.wordpress.com/

James L. Papandrea (born May 9, 1963) is an author, Catholic theologian, historian, speaker, and singer/songwriter. He is professor of church history and historical theology at Garrett-Evangelical Theological Seminary in Evanston, Illinois (on the campus of Northwestern University), and formerly taught at the Archdiocese of Chicago's Institute for Diaconal Studies.

His books have been translated into other languages, and he is on YouTube, including his video series, "The Original Church."

== Academic career ==
Papandrea earned an M.Div. degree from Fuller Theological Seminary (1989), and a Ph.D. from Northwestern University (1998), in the history of the early Church and the Roman Empire, with a secondary concentration in New Testament interpretation. He also received a certificate in the history and topography of the city of Rome from the American Academy in Rome (1995). In 2008, he started teaching early Church History at Garrett Evangelical Theological Seminary.

Papandrea is a senior fellow of the St. Paul Center for Biblical Theology, and a member of the Society of Biblical Literature (SBL), the North American Patristics Society (NAPS), the Academy of Catholic Theologians (ACT), and was named a "Springtime Ambassador" by the Springtime of Faith Foundation, which is an organization facilitating ecumenical dialogue and Christian cooperation.

== Musician/songwriter ==
In 1984, after several years with the Milwaukee-based band, the Crabs, and the Minneapolis-based band, Safari, Papandrea formed a group called the Neumes, which migrated from Minneapolis to Los Angeles. The Neumes released two recordings: Ars Nova and Contrast. In 1995, Papandrea formed the group, Remember Rome, which went on to release four CDs: Remember Rome, La Bocca della Veritá, Carpe Diem, and Holy Smoke – The Best of Remember Rome. He has been commissioned to write music for choirs, and has written two musicals, The Prodigal’s Dream (An Easter Opera), and Treasures of the Heart (A Christmas Musical). The song, "Miracle of Light", from Treasures of the Heart was featured in a Catholic Christmas compilation CD, and other songs of his have also been included in compilations.

Papandrea is a teacher of songwriting, having been trained in the methods of the Nashville Songwriters’ Association (NSAI), and a member of the Catholic Association of Music. In 2013, Papandrea released a solo CD entitled Still Quiet Voice, which is a collection of songs inspired by his Catholic faith. His music ministry often combines his original songs with inspirational speaking, and he also offers concerts that include prayer, Scripture readings and storytelling.

== Publications ==
- Papandrea, James L. (2008). The Trinitarian Theology of Novatian of Rome: A Study in Third Century Orthodoxy. Edwin Mellen Press. ISBN 978-0-7734-5026-4.
- Papandrea, James L. (2009). Pray (Not Just Say) the Lord's Prayer. Liguori Publications. ISBN 978-0-7648-1848-6. (Pamphlet)
- Papandrea, James L. (December 1, 2009). Spiritual Blueprint: How We Live, Work, Love, Play and Pray. Liguori Publications. ISBN 978-0-7648-1892-9.
- Papandrea, James L. (January 1, 2011). The Wedding of the Lamb: A Historical Approach to the Book of Revelation. Pickwick Publications. ISBN 978-1-60899-806-7.
- Papandrea, James L. (November 7, 2011). Novatian of Rome and the Culmination of Pre-Nicene Orthodoxy. Pickwick Publications. ISBN 978-1-60608-780-0.
- Papandrea, James L. (November 28, 2011). How to Be a Saint. Liguori Publications. ISBN 978-0-7648-2067-0. (Pamphlet)
- Papandrea, James L. (October 8, 2012). Rome: A Pilgrim's Guide to the Eternal City. Cascade Books. ISBN 978-1-61097-268-0.
- Papandrea, James L. (August 26, 2012). Trinity 101: Father Son Holy Spirit: Father, Son, and Holy Spirit. Liguori Publications. ISBN 978-0-7648-2082-3.
- Aquilina, Mike; Papandrea, James L. (2015). Seven Revolutions: How Christianity Changed the World and Can Change It Again. Random House/Image Books. ISBN 978-0-8041-3896-3.
- Papandrea, James L. (December 31, 2015). Novatian of Rome: On the Trinity, Letters to Cyprian of Carthage, Ethical Treatises. Brepols Publishers. ISBN 978-2-503-54491-5. (English Translations with Introduction)
- Papandrea, James L. (June 15, 2015). The Space Boys Meet the Moon Bully. 220 Communications. ISBN 978-1-5136-0068-0.
- Papandrea, James L. (October 1, 2015). Handed Down: The Catholic Faith of the Early Christians. Catholic Answers Press. ISBN 978-1-941663-53-0.
- Papandrea, James L. (2016). The Earliest Christologies: Five Images of Christ in the Postapostolic Age. IVP Academic. ISBN 978-0-8308-5127-0.
- Papandrea, James L. (2017). From Star Wars to Superman: Christ and Salvation in Science Fiction and Superhero Films. Sophia Institute Press. ISBN 978-1-62282-388-8.
- Aquilina, Mike; Papandrea, James L. (2018). How Christianity Saved Civilization... And Must Do So Again. Sophia Institute Press. ISBN 978-1-62282-719-0.
- Papandrea, James L. (2019). A Week in the Life of Rome. IVP Academic. ISBN 978-0-8308-2482-3.
- Papandrea, James L. (2019). What Really Happens After We Die: There WILL Be Hugs in Heaven. Sophia Institute Press. ISBN 978-1-62282-638-4.
- Papandrea, James L. (2019). The Early Church (33-313): St. Peter, the Apostles, the Martyrs (Vol. 1 of the Reclaiming Catholic History Series). Ave Maria Press. ISBN 978-1-59471-771-0.
- Papandrea, James L. (2021). Praying A Christ-Centered Rosary: Meditations on the Mysteries. Ave Maria Press. ISBN 978-1-59471-957-8.
- Papandrea, James L. (2021). The Squire's Journey. En Route Books and Media. ISBN 978-1-956715-05-7
- Papandrea, James L. (2022). Reading the Church Fathers: A History of the Early Church and the Development of Doctrine (second edition). Sophia Institute Press. ISBN 978-1-64413-656-0
- Papandrea, James L. (2022). Reading Scripture Like the Early Church: Seven Insights from the Church Fathers to Help You Understand the Bible. Sophia Institute Press. ISBN 978-1-64413-481-8
- Papandrea, James L. (2023). Praying the Psalms: The Divine Gateway to Lectio Divina and Contemplative Prayer. Sophia Institute Press. ISBN 979-8-88911-070-5
- Papandrea, James L. (2024). Praying Like the Early Church: Seven Insights from the Church Fathers to Help You Connect with God. Sophia Institute Press. ISBN 978-1-64413-816-8
- Papandrea, James L. (2025). ROME: A Pilgrim's Guide to the Eternal City - SECOND EDITION. Cascade Books. ISBN 979-8-3852-0664-3
- Papandrea, James L. (2025). The Original Church: What it Meant - and Still Means - to be a Christian. Scepter Publishers. ISBN 978-1-59417-573-2
