= Galactic Milieu =

Science fiction novel series by Julian May

A family tree of the main characters of the Galactic Milieu series

Galactic Milieu is a series of science fiction novels by Julian May. It is linked to her previously published series, the Saga of Pliocene Exile; and through the fantastical device of time-travel, acts as both a prequel and a sequel to this earlier series. The "Galactic Milieu" of the title is an interplanetary federation, and Earth's membership of it is a central plot concern.

It comprises four novels. Intervention covers the events leading up to Earth joining the Galactic Milieu, followed by the three books of the Galactic Milieu Trilogy – Jack the Bodiless, Diamond Mask and Magnificat – which together cover the events of Earth's membership of the Galactic Milieu.

The series involves several religious and philosophical themes, including references to the work of Pierre Teilhard de Chardin.

== The novels ==
The series begins with Intervention: A Root Tale to the Galactic Milieu and a Vinculum between it and The Saga of Pliocene Exile (ISBN 0-395-43782-2, Boston: Houghton Mifflin, 1987). This was released in one volume in the UK, but in mass market paperback in the US as two volumes: Surveillance and Metaconcert. May calls Intervention a vinculum, or link-tale, between the Saga of Pliocene Exile and the Milieu trilogy proper. However, it is a near-essential introduction to the Milieu trilogy as well as a balanced stand-alone work.

Jack the Bodiless (ISBN 0-679-40950-5, New York: Knopf, 1991) is the first book of the trilogy proper, followed by Diamond Mask (ISBN 0-679-43310-4, New York: Knopf, 1994), and Magnificat (ISBN 0-679-44177-8, New York: Knopf, 1996).

== Religious and philosophical themes ==
The series includes multiple references to the work of Pierre Teilhard de Chardin, including the concepts of the Omega Point and the Noosphere, which are applied to May's description of galactic mental Unity. The series title echoes Teilhard's 1957 book Le Milieu Divin.

The Remillard family are Catholic, and on several occasions family members discuss their faith. The most notable example occurs in the first part of Chapter 24 of Jack the Bodiless, where Teresa Kendall explains Christianity to her unborn son.

Jack the Bodiless begins with a set of quotations, including the Spanish proverb "God writes straight with crooked lines." This proverb summarises the plot of the whole series, in which tragedies and disasters (particularly the Metapsychic Rebellion) result in ultimate good (particularly the repentance and transformation of Marc Remillard, through which the Galactic Milieu is formed). The Rebellion is thus a Felix culpa.

Julian May's description of "metapsychic" abilities explicitly refers to the concepts of auras (particularly in Part III of Intervention) and chakras (particularly in discussing the feeding of the "Hydra").

== Aspects of May's Universe ==
=== Alien races ===
The Lylmik (LIL-mik) are the oldest race in the Galaxy, having been shepherded to mental Unity or "coadunation" by the entity known as Atoning Unifex. They created the Galactic Milieu, and in turn mentored the Krondaku, Gi, Simbiari, and Poltroyans. The Krondaku (krah'n-DAH-koo) are large tentacled invertebrate "monsters", the Gi (ghee) are feathered hermaphrodites with a well-developed aesthetic sense, the Simbiari (sih'm-bee-AH-ree) are green and slimy, while the Poltroyans are small purple humanoids who most resemble human beings both physically and mentally.

=== Planets ===
Events of the novels take place on several planets: Earth; the Concilium Orb, an artificial planet constructed by the Lylmik, and the seat of the galactic Council; Hibernia, an Irish-dominated human colony; Caledonia, a Scottish-dominated human colony; Denali, a snow-covered planet popular as a holiday destination; and the cosmopolitan human colony planet of Okanagon. Apart from the home planets and colonies of the alien races, a number of other planets are also mentioned in passing.

=== "Metapsychic" powers ===
Julian May describes five categories of "metapsychic" powers in the series: creativity, coercion, psychokinesis, farsensing and redaction. Each of these powers is associated with a colour, as originally described in the Saga of Pliocene Exile.

Creativity is the ability to create illusions and manipulate energy. In its strongest form, it can involve permanent changes of matter from one kind to another, as when Jack creates flowers from waste. The same level of power can also be used to create mental lasers, and the "Metapsychic Rebellion" causes considerable damage with such mental weapons, produced by brains amplified with cerebroenergetic (CE) equipment. Rogi possesses creative abilities, though unreliable ones, and these occasionally help him in moments of need.

Coercion is the ability of metapsychic mind control over other people. For example, in Magnificat, Denis uses metapsychic coercion to manipulate Rogi to climb Mt. Washington.

Psychokinesis (PK) is the ability to move physical objects through space metapsychically. Within the series, flagrant use of this power (especially amongst non-operants) is considered immensely juvenile and déclassé by most operants.

Farsensing is the ability to communicate with others and to sense remotely via metapsychic means, much like telepathy, clairvoyance, or remote viewing. In Intervention, the ability of farsensing (initially called "ultrasensing") to locate hidden weapons becomes geopolitically important.

Finally, Redaction provides the ability for mental healing, or can be abused for mental damage. Dorothea MacDonald has very strong redactive powers.

These five mental powers can be latent, meaning that, while present, they cannot be consciously used. On the other hand, operant powers are available for conscious, controlled use. Powers can also be suboperant, which means they can only be used unpredictably and are often inaccessible. Treatment by operants can sometimes raise suboperant mindpowers to operancy. Higher capabilities within operancy include Master, Grand Master, and Paramount Grand Master levels. Jack, Marc, and Dorothea are all (eventually) Paramounts.

Julian May describes collaborative as well as individual mental powers. A metaconcert is a synchronized use of mental powers by more than one person, in which the whole is greater than the sum of its parts, as when Jack and Dorothea tackle the geological problems of Caledonia. The ultimate extension of such collaboration is the mental Unity which the Lylmik are fostering in the galaxy.

== Plots of the novels ==
=== Intervention ===
The book follows the Remillard family of New Hampshire from the years immediately after World War II through an increasingly turbulent world, in which various "metapsychic" humans manoeuvre in secret to direct the destiny of the human race. The Remillards play a central role in this story, though the narrator, Rogatien "Uncle Rogi" Remillard, is often an alienated observer rather than a central participant. At the same time, the earth is under surveillance by representatives of a galactic culture (the "Galactic Milieu" of the series title), who monitor the human race's fitness for admission into the wider galactic community. Interwoven with this narrative are glimpses of the time after the main action of the series, drawing together threads from it and the Pliocene Exile series.

Intervention climaxes with the Great Intervention, the revelation of this wider galactic society. This sets the stage for the more focused story May has to tell in the remainder of the series.

This deals with the history of several family lines with strong metapsychic potential, especially the Remillards. This line begins with twins Rogatien (Rogi) and Donatien (Don), whose mother died giving birth to them. They discover that they have unusual mental abilities (which admittedly turn out to be far less than those of later generations of metapsychics). Rogi is a milder mannered man, who becomes sterile through mumps. Don is distrustful and malicious, but handsome and charming, and steals Rogi's girlfriend Marie Madeleine "Sunny" Fabré.

From an early age, Rogi was visited by an entity he called "the Family Ghost", and it is this entity who commanded Rogi to write his memoirs. The Ghost first rescued Rogi as a child, and many years later rescued Don after Rogi tried to kill him in a rage for stealing his girlfriend. The Ghost tells Rogi that he is sterile, but would have an important role in guiding Don's key descendants.

Rogi becomes close to Don and Sunny's firstborn child Denis. Denis is a precocious child, and quickly learns to master many metapsychic faculties, greatly exceeding those of Rogi and Don, in addition to excelling intellectually. Rogi becomes like a real father to him, while Don is always out getting drunk at night. Rogi and Denis start to search for people with similar powers. Don becomes jealous of Denis's powers but, through Denis's young coercion, is rendered unable to hurt him. Meanwhile, Don and Sunny raise their nine other children, including the monstrously evil second-born Victor, who terrorizes his younger siblings and suppresses their mental powers. Don focuses upon Victor as Denis grows up, seeming to shape him into a vigorous athletic counterpart to Denis's intellectual existence. The more sinister nature of Victor's influences becomes apparent in later volumes.

Don reacts against Rogi's influence upon his children, but cannot overcome Denis's attachment to his uncle. Rogi leaves for a job as a hotel manager, where Denis can visit during the holidays. Rogi worries about Denis's education, as his local school is not challenging, but Don does not see education as something to invest in for his children - especially for Denis. Rogi learns of a Jesuit monastic school and manages to get Don to allow him to send Denis there. This leads to Denis attending Dartmouth College due to a new program for "special students". He becomes prominent in many fields, particularly psychology and the understanding of "metapsychic" abilities, eventually becoming the "Grandfather of Metapsychology". Subsequent research yields results in many places in the world and Denis organizes yearly meetings within the secret metapsychic community.

At the same time, Victor is plotting with the sociopathic gangster metapsychic Kieran O'Connor to bring down the government with their metapsychic powers. This culminates in a showdown at the end of the book where Denis calls out to all the present and absent metapsychics of goodwill to join in a "metaconcert" against an attack by Victor and Kieran. The watching Milieu agents invisible in the sky hear this call, and the subsequent metaconcert, and therefore intervene. Victor, meanwhile, goes after Rogi who has learned too much. Through his metapsychic power of creativity, Rogi uses a mental laser to put Victor into a vegetative state. Rogi never understood how he could have overcome such a powerful metapsychic as Victor, until the Family Ghost reveals decades later that he assisted.

=== Jack the Bodiless ===
As the Milieu trilogy proper begins with Jack the Bodiless, humankind, led by the Remillard family, is awaiting acceptance into the Galactic Milieu. With Earth's government being overseen by one of the alien races (Simbiari) ultimately under the authority of the Galactic Milieu, harsh laws (including eugenics laws) are instituted, which fuels feelings of suspicion in both earth's normal and metapsychic population.

Denis by now has fathered many children, the youngest of whom (Paul) is elected leader of Humanity. Marc, Paul's firstborn with his wife Teresa Kendall — a grandchild of Don's via Rogi's former lover, Elaine, is the most powerful human metapsychic known at that time, who also has a genius-level intellect. Paul & Teresa started Marc's education while he was still in utero, which was by then becoming an accepted practice.

Also born, at Victor's deathbed, was Fury. This is a sociopathic entity that has its own agenda for the Galactic Milieu and the Remillard family in particular. Fury in turn 'created' from the minds of five unborn metapsychic fetuses, a physical monster called The Hydra to do its bidding.

Following a number of failed pregnancies Teresa has her reproductive license revoked (under the interdict, metapsychics must have permission to have children). Teresa then loses her ability to sing, and thereby loses Paul's attention.

Sometime later Teresa regains her voice and becomes illegally pregnant with the last of their children, and when Marc farsenses emotional problems over her pregnancy he visits his mother to investigate. Upon learning of his mother's pregnancy, Marc takes it upon himself to hide Teresa and his future brother in the icy Canadian wilderness. Marc realises that Rogi is the only family member who would be empathetic enough to help, and recruits him for this purpose. Marc fakes a "canoeing accident" so that the Remillard family and the Magistratum of the Milieu believe them dead, and after many months in the wilderness, Rogi assists Teresa in the birth, and Jon Remillard, the future "Saint Jack the Bodiless", is born.

Although Jack has the outward appearance of a normal human child, his intellect and mental prowess rapidly set him apart from the rest of humankind, as does the fact that his body begins to generate inoperable and incurable tumours that are slowly overwhelming him. Despite the fact that Jack possesses each of the five higher mindpowers (also known as metafaculties) at the highest known level (Paramount Grand Master), he is incapable of effecting change in his own physiology. The Lylmik, the oldest and most powerful of the alien races in the milieu, veto his euthanasia and leave it up to Jack. An attack by Fury on Jack as he lies in his hospital room leads to an evolutionary jump in which Jack discards his physical form and metamorphoses into his final state as a disembodied brain.

=== Diamond Mask ===
The second book deals mainly with Dorothea MacDonald on the Scottish world of Caledonia. Dorothea lives with her father and her brother amid several step brothers and sisters. Dorothea's mother and other relatives are killed in an attack by the entity known as Hydra, a "metapsychic entity" that Fury uses as an assassin. Hydra consists of four (formerly five) metapsychics who can mind-meld into a powerful vampiric metaconcert when not leading their normal lives. After this, Dorothea realises that she is a latent metapsychic — one with inherent potential but mental blocks that prevent her using her powers, as opposed to the "operant" metapsychics. However, she starts to overcome her blocks and is able to use her mind to protect and heal herself. Meanwhile, Paul Remillard is preparing for Human entry into the Milieu and is in line to become the inaugural First human Magnate of the Concillium. When his rival's wife is killed after being shoved into a trash compactor in an apparent suicide disguising her murder by Hydra, a hold is put on Human entry into the Milieu for 1,000 Galactic Days. The Krondaku investigators suspect the Remillards to be involved.

Dorothea turns out to be another Paramount, with incredibly strong redactive powers and resistance to metapsychic probes and attacks. Young Marc Remillard is not able to probe her mind even when his powers are enhanced by the cerebroenergetic (CE) equipment that he has invented, although CE allows him to resist counterprobes. She even manages to slip into Denis's mind, but he quickly throws her out before she can find out much.

Dorothea and Jack have a role in saving an inhabited planet from a diatreme eruption, using their paramount powers aided by CE. But her lower face is terribly deformed in this heroic act, so after this she always wears a diamond-studded half-mask, and acquires her nickname "Diamond Mask".

=== Magnificat ===
By the third book in the series, Marc has matured into a highly capable metapsychic and is regarded as a Paramount. Through manipulated dreams, Marc conceives an idea called 'Mental Man' which would create a new subspecies of Man called Homo [sapiens] summus. It would use selective breeding, surgical modification, mental training (through induced pain) and technological enhancement to create hundreds of humans with the powers — and disembodiment — of Marc's younger brother Jack. This project has been kept highly secret for several years, but peers and competitors of Marc begin to get suspicious. He develops several increasingly powerful CE devices. These amplify a human's inherent metapsychic ability by orders of magnitude. The CE device is discussed in the debates of the Concilium, and is deemed too dangerous to be generally used. Marc disagrees, his research continues in secret although outlawed, and culminates in devices capable of 600× amplification. Marc's increasing ambition draws him to side with a rebel faction of the Concillium — those that do not wish to join 'Unity' with the other races and therefore with the Galactic Mind itself. The rebel faction determinedly opposes this as they believe humans will lose their individuality and privacy and will become thralls to the other races.

== See also ==
- Julian May
- Saga of Pliocene Exile
- Non-Hive Group Minds (Science Fiction)
