= Breeks =

Breeches worn for outdoor activities in Scotland

Breeks is the Scots term for trousers or breeches. It is also used in Northumbrian English.

From this it might be inferred that breeches and breeks relate to the Latin references to the braccae that were worn by the ancient Celts, but the Oxford English Dictionary (also online) gives the etymology as "Common Germanic", compare modern Dutch broek, meaning trouser.

Outside Scotland the term breeks is often used to refer to breeches, a trouser similar to plus fours, especially when worn in Scotland and engaging in field sports such as deer stalking, and the activities of taking pheasant, duck, partridge and other game birds. Whilst breeks are a neater, trimmer fit, plus twos are slightly wider with an extra 2 inches of material to fold over the knee, and plus fours a further 4 inches of material (and a wider, baggier fit).
