= LignoSat =

Japanese wooden satellite

LignoSat 1
- COSPAR ID: 1998-067XD
- SATCAT no.: 62297
- Mission duration: 4 months, 6 days

Spacecraft properties
- Spacecraft type: 1U CubeSat
- Manufacturer: Kyoto University; Sumitomo Forestry
- Launch mass: 0.9 kg (2.0 lb)
- Dimensions: 10 x 10 x 10 cm

Start of mission
- Launch date: 02:29, November 5, 2024 (UTC)
- Rocket: Falcon 9 Block 5
- Launch site: Kennedy LC-39A
- Contractor: SpaceX
- Deployed from: ISS
- Deployment date: 9 December 2024

End of mission
- Disposal: Spacecraft failure
- Last contact: 11 March 2025
- Decay date: 3 April 2025

LignoSat is a small Japanese wooden satellite. It is credited as the world's first satellite to be made of wood.

== Background ==
LignoSat was developed by Kyoto University and logging firm Sumitomo Forestry as a demonstration of using wood for space exploration uses.

The satellite is named after the Latin word for "wood" which is "Ligno". LignoSat is made of wood from honoki, a magnolia tree native in Japan. Wood from the tree is customarily used for sword sheaths. The choice of material was determined through a 10-month experiment aboard the International Space Station. The satellite was assembled through a traditional Japanese crafts technique without screws or glue. It still has some traditional aluminium structures and electronic components.

== LignoSat 1 ==
The LignoSat 1 is a CubeSat and measures 10 centimetres (3.9 in) on each side, and weighs 900 grams (32 oz)

The satellite was launched to space on November 5, 2024 by SpaceX's Falcon 9 Block 5 rocket inside the uncrewed Cargo Dragon from the Kennedy Space Center in Florida to the International Space Station.

It was deployed into orbit from the ISS on 9 December 2024, but it could not establish communication with ground station. During the time in orbit the satellite stayed in one piece.

== LignoSat 2 ==
LignoSat 2 is a 2U CubeSat. As of 2023, it is planned for launch in 2026.
