= George Farquhar Graham =

George Farquhar Graham (1789–1867) was a Scottish musicologist, who published a three-volume collected edition of Scottish songs, entitled Songs of Scotland, adapted to their appropriate melodies. Originally published by Wood and Co. of Edinburgh, the collection has been reprinted many times.

Graham attended the University of Edinburgh, and apparently studied law. Following a spell of ill-health, he travelled to France and Italy in his youth, and Aberdonian musician and publisher James Davie believed that Graham might have had harmony lessons from Beethoven on the Continent at some point. Graham's own publisher, Wood, was himself a pupil of Czerny, who had similarly been a pupil of Beethoven.

Although George Farquhar Graham was named as solely responsible for the annotations in the original Songs of Scotland, Wood augmented these notes for the subsequent editions in 1887 and 1908.
