= Magnificat Meal Movement =

1980–90's Australian Christian movement

The Magnificat Meal Movement International (MMMI) was formed in 1986 as a "missionary" offshoot of the 'Celtic Corma Adoration' group of Australia, which was founded in Melbourne in 1976 by J. Phelan, F. Eaton, D. Burslem and E. Burslem. The original name, "Celtic Adorers", was chosen by J. Phelan. This name changed in the early 1990s. The Magnificat Meal Movement is regarded by mainstream Christian churches as a cult. Debra Burslem, its most prominent ongoing leader, now lives in Vanuatu which some claim is for the purpose of avoiding the Australian Federal Police on multiple charges of embezzlement and tax fraud.

== Aims ==
The group describes its aims as primarily prayer, service and the study of seeking the truth as revealed through the light of the "Celtic Corma Adoration" (CCA) research.

== Beliefs ==
The Magnificat Meal Movement International seeks to maintain the "original light teachings established by Yashua Jesus." The CCA and the MMMI recognise the 1st-century church teachings established by the Marys and Joseph of Arimathea and the original teachings of Celtic followers of the "way" in the Celtic realm of Britain in the first century.

The CCA and the MMMI have a Levitical priesthood and the global church-basilica is made up of churches throughout the world. Adherents believe that salvation is through unity with the 'living one' by being united with the identity of Yashua Jesus. The CCA and the MMMI do not believe in the "End Times" or Millennial-type teachings, but advocate that we are living already in a "New Galactic Era".

The most publicized home-basilica-church and teaching centre for the CCA and its offshoot, the MMMI, is based in Helidon, a small town about 130 km west of Brisbane in the Lockyer Valley just east of Toowoomba in Queensland, Australia.

Both the CCA and the MMMI emphasise Marian-style study and application of the Gospel of Mary. Mary is honored as an example of co-operation of the creature with the Divine. All adherents are encouraged to live a similar lifestyle of divine co-operation as they feel and study such writings as the Gospel of Mary.

== Humanitarian work ==
Humanitarian work and service to others, is also important to both the CCA and the MMMI missionary offshoot, as a work of being united like 'Slaves of Love' for humanity as outlined in the 'Gospel of Thomas' Nag Hammadi Library. Most MMMI and CCA and various other support groups are involved in extensive works of prayer, unity and service to humanity which they each finance from their own businesses.

== Connection with Roman Catholic Church ==
The Celtic Corma Adorers (CCA) Church, or the Magnificat Meal Movement International (MMMI) has been characterised as an offshoot of the Roman Catholic Church, having been excommunicated and barred from the Eucharist by the Catholic Bishop of Toowoomba, Bill Morris, who has made repeated statements distancing the Roman Catholic Church from the movement.

Though the followers of the movement presently deny any past connection to the Roman Catholic Church, the word 'Meal' within the name of the movement referred originally to the sharing of the Eucharist. The group was initially very involved in reviving the practice of Eucharistic Adoration in Catholic parishes, and Debra Burslem, the self-proclaimed Prophetess of the movement, publicly affirmed her affiliation with the Roman Catholic Church and claims to have received support from Catholic priest Fr. Jack Salisbury.
