= Saga of Pliocene Exile =

Series of science/speculative fiction books by Julian May

The Saga of Pliocene Exile (or the Saga of the Exiles) is a series of science/speculative fiction books by Julian May, first published in the early 1980s. It consists of four books: The Many-Colored Land, The Golden Torc, The Nonborn King and The Adversary.

The story spans two time periods: the near future, where humans inhabit over 700 planets as part of the Galactic Milieu, an empire of five space-faring species, and the Earth six million years in the past at a time when the Strait of Gibraltar is closed and the Mediterranean Sea is dry and empty. The Many Colored Land and The Golden Torc are set in mainly in Europe just before and during the rupture at Gibraltar. The rupture and the rapid filling of the Mediterranean, based on the geological event known as the Zanclean Flood, form a Wagnerian climax to The Golden Torc, in which aliens and time-traveling humans are caught up in this cataclysm.

== Main story ==
The Saga of Pliocene Exile is a narrative of the adventures of a group of late 21st and early 22nd century outcasts who travel through a one-way time-gate to Earth's Pliocene epoch for a variety of reasons. However, the reality the travelers find in Pliocene Europe is far from their expectations as it is already inhabited by a dimorphic race of aliens ('exotics'), Tanu and Firvulag. These exotics, who have fled their home galaxy because of religious persecution, were marooned on Pliocene Earth when their "living" ship crashed on Earth.

The Tanu and Firvulag have metapsychic powers and are extremely long-lived. The Tanu use a torc-like device to bring their wide variety of latent metapsychic abilities into a partial operancy, while the Firvulag are naturally operant metapsychics, but have a limited range of abilities compared to the Tanu. The Earth was selected by the living ship as a new home for reasons that are unknown but are speculated to relate to either a prophecy by the ship or because the primitive Pliocene hominids are genetically compatible with the Tanu/Firvulag. Over time, both races (but especially the Tanu) were found to have difficulty reproducing on Earth due to the higher levels of terrestrial and solar radiation relative to their home world. When the time-traveling humans started to arrive in the Pliocene, the Tanu enslaved many of them in an effort to overcome this problem, interbreeding with the humans who have latent metapsychic abilities and soon incorporating humanity into their Pliocene society. The Firvulag are, in the main, more robust than the Tanu and are less affected by the higher levels of radiation on Earth. The Firvulag choose to not interbreed with humans and disagree with the Tanu's decision to integrate humans into their society, preferring to preserve the traditions of their home world. Some humans escape the Tanu's benevolent enslavement and choose to live freely in small hidden villages. They are referred to as 'lowlives' by both exotic races and integrated humanity as well.

The plot follows a group of time travelers beginning with the events that caused them to seek exile from the future and the disruption they bring to the established societies in the Pliocene.

=== The Pliocene Gateway ===
While the discovery of time travel is a great scientific achievement, its practical application is limited. After the initial discovery, it is soon found that due to its very specific geographic and other requirements, the time gate only works in one location and one point in time in the past. The device can be used to transport people, animals, and objects back in time to the Pliocene era intact, but any attempt to travel forward in time from the Pliocene by the same method ages the traveler or object by six million years instantaneously. This effectively makes the portal a one-way trip for any living being and other organic objects. This limitation also made communication from the time travelers almost impossible, making it a blind one-way trip. After the death of the inventor, his widow finds herself inundated with a steady stream of late 21st and early 22nd century misfits/outcasts begging to be allowed to escape the modern world for a chance to start over in the imagined simplicity of the Pliocene. The widow finally gives in and eventually establishes a regular training program for the "groups" making the trip to ensure they have the basics for survival and a trade in the Pliocene era.

To prevent any contamination of the past, the Galactic Milieu sterilises all females by salpingectomy before allowing them to go back to the past and does not allow any advanced technology that will not decompose after around a hundred years to be taken. The Milieu also bars any operant metapsychics.

== Pliocene races ==
=== Tanu and Firvulag ===
The exotics inhabiting the Pliocene Epoch, despite being separated from the appearance of humans on Earth by millions of years, closely resemble the Tuatha Dé Danann and Firbolg of Celtic Mythology.

The exotics are known as the 'Tanu' and the 'Firvulag', and together constitute a single dimorphic race. The Firvulag are the 'metapsychically operant' [see below] members of that race, and the Tanu are the 'metapsychically latent' half. However, the majority of Firvulag have only weak mental powers, whereas the Tanu wear torcs, which are also mind-amplifying devices to allow use of their mental powers. The Tanu are generally much longer lived than the Firvulag. The four books of the Saga of Pliocene Exile abound with Tanu who are more than a thousand years old, who were not born on Earth, and who are called 'first comers' because of the fact. Examples of 'first comers' include King Thagdal, Celadeyr of Afaliah, and Dionket Lord-Healer. The Firvulag are not usually as long lived, although they have a few first-comers of their own (King Yeochee and Palloll One-Eye among them), but are physically hardier and more resistant to Earthly radiation than the Tanu.

The Tanu and Firvulag are sworn enemies, with each race routinely attacking the other. The only exceptions to this are in the month before and the month after the ritual Grand Combat, a gladiatorial combat that pits Tanu against Firvulag. These two months are called The Truce and allow for trade between the two races and time to safely travel to and from the White Silver Plain or Field of Gold, depending on where the Grand Combat is hosted. (The winners of the previous year's Combat host the next.)

Firvulag babies are frequently born to Tanu mothers carrying recessive Firvulag genes. These babies are cared for until they can be handed safely over to the Firvulag. Firvulag never produce Tanu babies.

Both Tanu and Firvulag can be killed by objects made of iron, which they call "blood-metal." Its use in weapons is forbidden by their battle code and all iron objects are confiscated from time travelers and destroyed. Since the exotics are otherwise extremely difficult to kill, lowlife humans take advantage of this weakness once it is discovered.

==== The Tanu ====
The Tanu (e.g., Nodonn Battlemaster, Kuhal Earthshaker, Minnanon the Heretic, et al.) are extremely tall, slim and beautiful, and live in large cities across southwest Europe. They tend to have fair hair and green or blue eyes. Their women have long pendulous breasts reaching as far as their waistline. Their latent metapsychic abilities, once brought to operancy by the Torcs, are on average stronger and display a wider range of abilities than those of the Firvulag; however, the Firvulag outnumber the Tanu considerably, which for a long while meant that there was a balance between the two races.

In the forty years before the start of the first book in the series, however, the Tanu have claimed ascendancy. Their use of humans to augment their reproductive capacity means that their numbers are rising, albeit with Tanu/human hybrids rather than true Tanu. They also bolster their ranks with large numbers of grey-torc wearing humans. This gives them an advantage in the Grand Combat (the annual ritual war between Tanu and Firvulag), since these "half-breeds" fight on their side. The Tanu have won the Combat without fail for the past forty years, because of their use of humanity and human innovations, such as the grey-torc shock troops and the use of horse-like chalicotheres (known as 'chalikos') as riding animals giving the Tanu cavalry that the Firvulag lack.

==== Tanu/human hybrids ====
Because the Tanu use humans to reproduce, a number of the 'Tanu' are in reality Tanu/human hybrids (e.g., Bleyn the Champion, Alberonn Mindeater, Katlinel the Darkeyed, et al.). It is generally accepted amongst the Tanu that provided a person looks like a Tanu, they are one, in the same way that humans with gold torcs are considered to be honorary Tanu. However, there is a certain amount of discrimination against them from more conservative Tanu.

There are some differences between pure Tanu and hybrids. Hybrids tend to be hairier, darker, have coarser features and less of the ethereal beauty of the Tanu. They also have a much more muscular figure, and often have stronger metapsychic powers. Unlike the Firvulag and the Tanu, hybrids are not poisoned by iron and are not as affected by Earth radiation levels, nor are they as likely to give birth to Firvulag or black-torc babies (incompatible with the mental amplifiers known as golden torcs that enable the Tanu to utilize their otherwise latent metafunctions).

==== Firvulag ====
The Firvulag (e.g. Fitharn Pegleg) are, on the whole, small, dark and less good-looking than the Tanu, although this is not always the case and there are some giants among them. Some Firvulag are large enough that they would not look out of place on a present-day street, while the greatest heroes and leaders amongst the Firvulag (i.e. Pallol One-Eye, Betularn the Whitehand, Medor Battlemaster, etc.) – who also have the most powerful mental abilities – are true giants, from 8 to 12 feet tall, and massively strong. The giants often self-identify as 'ogres' and the smaller Firvulag as 'gnomes' or 'goblins'. The Firvulag mostly live in mountains and caves, far away from the Tanu, and regard both humans and Tanu with disdain. The ogres in particular consider humanity to be tasty prey first and foremost. At the beginning of the series, they have a shaky treaty with the 'lowlife' human escapees of the Tanu regime.

The Firvulag are primarily creative adepts, spinning horrific illusions around themselves and projecting confusion and pain in battle to terrify their opponents. They are merciless fighters and when working together are capable of driving a human or weak Tanu mind completely mad with their illusions.

The Firvulag martial tradition is very conservative. They do not ride chalikos into battle, unlike the Tanu and their human cavalry. They wear obsidian armor and fight using obsidian-bladed swords and obsidian-tipped spears. In battle, they fight like an unorganized mob of infantry. They usually throw their spears in the first rush of battle, then close in using their swords and mind powers. For the last 40 years, the Firvulag have lost every one of the Grand Combats because their unorganized and undisciplined infantry cannot withstand the shock of a heavy cavalry charge. Exiled humans introduced the concept of heavy cavalry to the Tanu and helped them mentally tame the chalikos.

Because of their constant Grand Combat defeats, the Firvulag have recently been growing desperate, and have been willing to take on lowlife humans like Madame Guderian as military advisors. The Firvulag under new rulership later in the series are beginning to employ more and more human military tactics and equipment to the detriment of the Tanu and humans alike.

==== The Howlers ====
The Howlers are a rogue Firvulag faction inhabiting the mountains of the Vosges, who parted with mainstream Firvulag society 800 years before the beginning of the first book in the series, over the issue of the perpetual enmity between Tanu and Firvulag. The Howlers are essentially a peace-loving people, and have long been spiritual, if not actual, allies of the Peace Faction amongst the Tanu, who are also opposed to the battle-religion practiced by the Tanu and Firvulag. After over-exposure to dangerous radiation in the radium-rich mountains they have chosen to live in, they have mutated into hideous, deformed entities, filled with self-loathing, who attack anyone who strays into their territory.

Technically they are ruled by the King of the Firvulag, but this is in name only, and they have their own king, Sugoll. Both by Sugoll's own assertion and the attestation of the rest of the Howlers, Sugoll is first among the Howlers in all things – mental power, physical ability, and, most of all, physical deformity. Sugoll, although often robed in a handsome illusory body, is the most hideous and terrifying of all the Howlers.

By the end of the series, the Howlers have left their radioactive mountain home and moved to the deserted Firvulag city of Nionel, where they set up a genetic plan to restore their hideously mutated selves to some degree of normality. Interbreeding with humans, to revitalize their genetic stock with uncorrupted alleles, is a major component of this scheme, formulated by a slightly insane gold-torc human Genetics Master named Greg-Donnet, who had fled the Tanu capital of Muriah. Although the Howlers can create beautiful illusions around themselves to disguise their mutations, these illusions do not work on normal Firvulag. They are very effective for humans, though, which is fortunate for Greg-Donnet's schemes.

=== The race from Lene ===
Little is known about this race of people from the same galaxy as the Tanu and Firvulag, but a different planet. Whereas the Tanu and Firvulag come from the planet Duat, which also gives the entire galaxy its name, this race comes from Lene. Thousands of years before the action of the novels, the inhabitants of Duat developed interstellar travel, and colonized other planets in their native galaxy. These other planets came to be called 'Daughter Worlds', as in 'the daughter worlds of Duat'. A series of wars and the passage of time cut off Duat from these other worlds. Among the daughter worlds only Lene retained any form of space travel, and only very primitive reaction engines. The war left Duat with a wildly varying climate, and because of this, over a thousand generations on Duat, the race diverged into two separate races, the Tanu and the Firvulag. The Tanu lived in the open overcast lowlands and grew tall and lithe. They were metapsychically latent and developed and employed torcs to raise them to a limited form of metapsychic operancy. The Firvulag who dwelt in the cold, high mountains close to the mines they worked for gems grew small and hardy and were naturally operant, but most were much more weakly powered and often limited to Creativity and Farsense. The divergent races were hostile to each other and together developed a highly ritualized battle-religion to formalize the war between them. When science advanced enough to allow for interstellar travel once again (by the daughter worlds), Duat was re-discovered and while the original race was shocked at the divergence of the races there from their own, it was then discovered that the torcs also worked well on most but not all the inhabitants of the daughter worlds. Certain (female) members of Lene, known as Shipspouses, developed a symbiotic relationship with enormous sentient interstellar organisms known as Ships which were capable of superluminal travel. Only one member of the race which inhabits Lene appears in the Saga of Pliocene Exile. She is Brede Shipspouse. She seems longer lived than either the Tanu or Firvulag. She also has 2 legacy powers from her time as Shipspouse: the ability to D-jump and the "mitigator" program that greatly reduced the pain that traveling through the "gray limbo" of hyperspace causes to sentient races. The further the jump the more severe the pain. When the daughter race demanded that the Tanu and Firvulag discard their ancient battle-religion and rejoin the rest of the race, a small number refused to and chose to fight a final apocalyptic war to the end. The daughter race intervened to prevent this, and so the remaining Tanu and Firvulag fled with the sympathetic Brede in her Ship into another Galaxy to survive or fight their Nightfall war to the end. Earth was chosen as the best planet capable of supporting the lives of the two races that the Ship, now dying from the immense strain of the Intergalactic jump, could reach before its death.

=== Ships ===
Gigantic crystalline organisms, self-aware and powerfully psychic, which evolved in and continue to inhabit interstellar space in the Duat Galaxy. Ships were capable of superluminal travel through mental generation of an aperture into hyperspace ("grey limbo"). Ships were entirely benevolent and many of them undertook a symbiotic "mind-marriage" with humanoid females of the Duat daughter-worlds. Ships routinely carried the Duat citizenry on interstellar voyages of considerable distance, the passengers traveling within a vessel embedded in the Ship's crystal body.

=== Humans ===
Humans in the Pliocene Epoch play a variety of different roles and are difficult to classify as a group. Virtually all humans are time-travelers from the 21st century, as the Tanu forbid human/human procreation on pain of death, so human children are born only in outcast villages. Nevertheless, there are some humans born in the Pliocene (i.e. Sunny Jim Quigley and Calistro, a goatherder).

Most humans are happy with Tanu rule. Humans with valuable talents like genetics, robotics, etc. are often given golden torcs and are sometimes even ennobled. Other humans with latent metapsychic powers are also given silver torcs which brings them to operable just like the golden torcs, but also contain the control circuitry of the gray torc. These provisional citizens may eventually achieve a golden torc and full citizenship within Tanu society. This is of course, as long as these humans are willing to work for the benefit of the Tanu. Though ramapithecine apes are made to do a lot of the menial labor in the Tanu kingdom, human grey torc slaves end up doing the more complex and dangerous grunt work. For example, grey torc humans are used as shock troops, cavalry, cannon fodder, and as guards.

In order to increase their population more rapidly, the Tanu have been using humans as breeding stock ever since they arrived. The human women have their tubal ligation reversed. Those human women who are metapsychically gifted or have some unique, highly desired talent are often married off to Tanu nobles, after they each have spent one night with King Thagdal. Thagdal is very fertile (which is the main reason he is king) so many of the women who are forced to sleep with him are impregnated. Those human women who are less talented but are beautiful end up in houses of pleasure where they are forced to service the sexual and breeding needs of Tanu. Any children resulting from this sexual slavery are separated from their mothers at birth and are placed in adoption with a Tanu couple, to be raised as Tanu.

Human males are also forced to become genetic donors. Those humans who are metapsychically or aesthetically gifted are used by Tanu women who desire to have children. The human males are not allowed to refuse the sexual attentions of the Tanu. Many human men however find this duty not onerous at all as the Tanu ladies are often quite beautiful, exotic, and metapsychically gifted thus able to enhance the man's pleasure far beyond what sex with human women can provide. Others less able to tolerate this quickly become burnt out due to repeated metapsychic trauma.

==== Lowlives ====
The "Lowlives" is a term referring to humans in Pliocene Europe. The Firvulag call all humans Lowlives, while the Tanu and humanity reserve the term for those humans in Pliocene Europe not ruled by the Tanu. They live in small bands without medical care or good supplies and are harassed by both the Tanu and Firvulag, although at the beginning of the series there is a shaky treaty in place between the Vosges Lowlives and the Firvulag. It is difficult for free humans to exist in large groups as they become easy targets for exotic attacks. However, In The Many-Colored Land, the Lowlives begin to fight against their oppressors, attacking the Tanu city of Finiah with the Firvulag.

=== Ramas ===
The only true "natives" in the book, the Ramapithecus are a race of small, somewhat fragile seeming hominids, believed (at the time of writing, though no longer) to be the original ancestors of modern humanity. The "Ramas" were enslaved by the Tanu when the exotics first arrived on the planet, through the use of Torcs with control and mindspeak circuits. A derivative form of these circuits were used to create the Gray Torcs and also used in Silver Torcs, derived from the Tanu's own Gold Torcs. The Ramas were in some cases supplanted by the arrival of 21st century humans who are not only more intelligent, but more robust than the simple Ramas. They are still heavily used in farming, mining and other forms of unskilled manual labour, and occasionally still used as surrogate wombs for Tanu offspring as was originally done before humanity arrived.

== Metapsychic powers ==
The author of the novels, Julian May, prefers the term 'metapsychic' to the terms 'psionic' or 'psychic', which she considers mundane and un-evocative thus 'Metapsychic' powers are psychic abilities by another name. Humans in the late 21st century, along with the other races of the Galactic Milieu (the Lylmik, Gi, Krondaku, Poltroyans, and Simbiari) and the Tanu and Firvulag of the Pliocene epoch, have developed psychic powers. The psychic powers of Julian May's books are seemingly magical powers which go far beyond the 'simple' psychic abilities we more commonly think of, such as clairvoyance, telepathy, and telekinesis. The human race is a blend of 'operant' metapsychics (not very many, but more born every day), 'latent' metapsychics (uncommon, and unable to use their potential abilities for a number of reasons, but their offspring have a higher chance to be brought to operancy when born), and those with no useful metapsychic potential at all (most of humanity).

=== Operancy and latency ===
Operancy: Psychic powers which are available for conscious, controlled use by a person. In the Pliocene Epoch, the Firvulag were naturally operant. They did not require torcs or other mechanical assistance to be able to use their psychic powers.

Operant humans in the Galactic Milieu are not allowed to enter Exile, so most humans in the Pliocene are latent at most. The few who are operant are sometimes categorized using terms from the Milieu. These categories include adept (stronger and more in control of their abilities than basic operants, roughly 1 in 10 of operants) masterclass (a well above normal level of metapsychic power roughly 1 in 10,000), the grand master class adepts (extremely powerful metapsychic abilities in 1 or more categories, like Elizabeth. One in a million) and the Paramount Grand Masters (with truly world-shaking metapsychic powers. This incredibly rare group, about one per billion humans include Marc Remillard. Individuals generally have different levels of ability in the various classes of metapsychic powers they may possess.

Latency: Psychic powers which, although present, cannot be consciously used by a person – because of a lack of training, inhibiting factors, trauma, or mental blocks of uncertain origin. In theory, all humans have some psychic abilities, even though they may be hopelessly latent or extremely meager. The Tanu and the vast majority of humans are latents, with most humans having extremely meager abilities. The Tanu use torcs to allow them to use their psychic powers.

In places May implies that individuals noted for possession of an extremely high level of a skill or an attribute are often latents who make unconscious use of their metapsychic powers. For example, Felice (an individual with extremely powerful latencies) has a natural ability to control animals, and many individuals with latent Creative powers are gifted artists or scientists, while those with latent Coercive ability may have substantial charisma – animal magnetism.

=== Types of metapsychic powers ===
There are five types of 'metapsychic' power described in the series: creation, coercion, psychokinesis, farsensing and redaction.

Creativity: described as an ability to create illusions, change shape, manipulate energy and assemble matter into new forms. The Firvulag are described as being naturally gifted at creativity, often using it to assume monstrous forms. More powerful individuals could use it to crudely change states of matter (air to plasma and thus throw lightning bolts and so forth) but the most powerful can actually manipulate and change the very form of matter (the character Mercy frequently demonstrates the ability to create food for example).

Coercion: the ability of metapsychic mind control over other people as well as overwhelming an enemy's mental defenses and performing mental defenses against attacks.

Psychokinesis: (or PK) the ability to move physical objects through space metapsychically. This can also be used to focus air into pneumatic bolts for attack or demolition. The most powerful can use this ability to fly and carry additional loads.

Farsensing: the ability to communicate with others and to sense remotely via metapsychic means. In the story "Intervention", this ability is initially termed ultrasensing.

Redaction: the ability of psychic healing and, to a certain extent, mind reading. This is most commonly described in the books for mental or psychological healing, but it is also used for healing physical ailments as well. It was also used in the Galactic Milieu to help latent metapsychics achieve operancy. It could also occasionally be used for interrogation and torture. In the Galactic Milieu recidivist criminals would be adjusted with this power.

Each latent or operant individual has a different combination of these abilities and, amongst the Tanu, those with similar abilities were organized into guilds, called the Five Guilds Mental, each with a guild leader. All of the guilds came under the authority of a Tanu noble called the Dean of Guilds, Lady Eadone Sciencemaster (the oldest surviving child of the Tanu King Thagdal).

Prolepsis, the ability to predict future events, is a sixth power alluded to in The Saga of Pliocene Exile and explored a little in the Galactic Milieu trilogy. Supposedly a power held by the Tanu nominated Kingmaker, it is considered unreliable in the time of the Galactic Milieu.

D-jumping (dimension jumping) or teleportation may also be considered a metapsychic power, but appears more in the Galactic Milieu Series of books also by Julian May. For the purposes of the Saga of Pliocene Exile only Brede, Felice, and later Marc have been able to use this power.

== Torcs ==
There are three kinds of torc made by the Tanu: gold, silver and grey. Gold Torcs are the original version, worn by all pure-blooded Tanu, as well as the inhabitants of the Daughter Worlds back in the Duat Galaxy. A gold torc makes a person with latent powers completely operant in those powers.

Dr. Eusebio Gomez-Nolan, a human who was given the name Sebi-Gomnol by the Tanu, invented the silver and grey torcs, along with much simplified torc-like devices for controlling the ramapithecine apes which do the drudge work in Tanu society. These lesser torcs allow for control of the wearer by any gold torc wearer.

Silver Torcs give operancy equal to that of the gold, but unlike the gold torc they also incorporate control circuitry. This allows a gold torc wearer to compel obedience in the silver torc wearer, allows for punishment or reward of the silver torc wearer via so-called pleasure-pain circuitry, and act as a means of mentally tracking the wearer. (Therefore, a silver torc wearer can never succeed in running away, unless their metapsychic talent is so great it burns out the torc circuitry (see Aiken)). Humans with significant latent powers who come through the time-gate are initially given silver torcs. This allows the Tanu a degree of control over them until they prove themselves trustworthy, at which point they may be given a gold torc.

Grey Torcs do not enhance metapsychic powers at all, although they do grant the wearer a much simplified version of Farspeech. They have control circuitry like that found in the silver torcs. They are given to humans with no significant latent metapsychic powers at all, but who have skills which the Tanu consider to be vital or sensitive, e.g. physicians, technicians, soldiers/guards.

== Influences ==
While the Saga of the Exiles and the Galactic Milieu series contain standard science fiction elements, such as time travel, aliens, metapsychic powers and futuristic worlds, May grounded her fantastical worlds in science, psychology, and mythology.

May's studies in paleontology and climatology inform the Many Colored Land's geography, as well as helping readers to visualize the flora and fauna of the Pliocene epoch. Both series are peppered with concepts from physics, genetics, higher mathematics, linguistics, human psychology, and Jungian psychology in particular.

Mythology, however, appears to be the strongest influence on the Saga of the Exiles. There are many parallels between the persons and places of the Saga of the Exiles and Celtic (and other) myths and legends. The presumption is that such myths and legends result from the peoples, individuals, and events in this story, creating a loop that connects the present to six million years in the past. The list below is far from exhaustive.

- Tanu – the tall and beautiful exotic race – the Tuatha Dé Danann, mythical gods and kings of Ireland
- Tana – goddess of the Tanu = Dana, goddess of the Tuatha Dé Danaan
- Firvulag – the dwarf or goblin-like exotic race – the Fir Bolg, enemies of the Tuatha Dé Danann
- High Vrazel, the royal seat of the Firvulag – Hy-Brasil, a mist-cloaked phantom island off the Irish coast
- Finiah – destroyed by the Lowlives – Finias, one of the cities of the Tuatha Dé Danann
- Goriah – Gorias, one of the cities of the Tuatha Dé Danann
- Thagdal – King of the Tanu – The Dagda, King of the Tuatha Dé Danann
- Nodonn – Battlemaster of the Tanu – Nuada of the Silver Hand
- Ogmol – Half-human son of the Thagdal – Ogma Irish Celtic god of learning
- Brede Ship-spouse – Wife of the Ship that guided the Tanu and Firvulag to Earth, from Lene (a daughter world of Duat), often called two-faced by the Firvulag – Brigid Irish goddess of poetry, smithing, and healing
- Yeochee – King of the Firvulag – Eochaid mac Eirc, King of the Fir Bolg
- Pallol – Battlemaster of the Firvulag – Balor of the Evil Eye, a king of the Fomorians
- Morigel – the name given by the Tanu to Felice – Morrigan, goddess associated with war, who also favours the form of a crow or raven
- Dionket Lord-Healer – Dian Cecht, Celtic god of healing
- Miakonn Healerson – son of Dionket – Miach, son of Dian Cecht, and a member of the Tuatha Dé Danaan known for his skill at healing
- Muriah – capital city of the Tanu – Mu, a sunken continent legend, or Murias, one of the cities of the Tuatha
- Minanonn the Heretic – Irish Celtic god of the sea Manannan mac Lir, or Welsh Manawydan
- Creyn – Tanu redactor, Irish Celtic god of crafts (who fixed the silver hand created by Dian Cecht to Nuada's arm) Creidhne
- Boanda – Boann, deceased Tanu noblewoman and Celtic goddess of the River Boyne
- Kuhal Earthshaker and his brother Fian Skybreaker – the Irish legends of Cuchulainn and Fionn mac Cumhaill
- Lugonn – the Tanu Battlemaster prior to Nodonn – Lugh, Celtic sun god
- Skathe – Firvulag warrioress, Scáthach, Scottish warrior woman and battle teacher
- Ayfa – Firvulag warrioress, wife of King Sharn – Aífe, Scottish warrior woman, sister to Scáthach
- Delbaeth – the Shape of Fire, Firvulag foe – Delbáeth, son of Ogma of the Tuatha Dé Danaan
- Nukalavee the Skinless – Firvulag champion, who looks like a flayed centaur – Nuckelavee – Orkney island water horse monster
- Leyr the Brave – deceased Tanu warrior – Lir, Celtic sea god, father of Manannan mac Lir
- Epone – Tanu woman – Epona, Celtic goddess, protector of horses
- Iskender-Kernonn – Human animal trainer, Lord of Animals, killed by the Firvulag – Cernunnos, Gaulish god of beasts
- Sebi-Gomnol – Human Lord Coercer Eusebio Gomez-Nolan, engineer who created the grey and silver torcs – Goibniu, Irish smith-god
- Richard Voorhees – a Dutch spacecraft captain, dies when he places an old Tanu spaceship into a parking orbit around the Earth – perhaps giving rise to the legend of the eternally sailing Flying Dutchman
- Aiken Drum – the Nonborn King, was based on a popular Scottish folk song and nursery rhyme called Aiken Drum.

== Related ==
Julian May has written nine books which concern this material.

- The Many Colored Land is the first book in the Saga of Pliocene Exile. It climaxes with the joint and successful Lowlife human-Firvulag attack on the remote but strategically vital Tanu city of Finiah.
- The Golden Torc is the second book of the Saga of Pliocene Exile. Although the idea was eventually discarded, May had originally envisioned "The Many Colored Land" and "The Golden Torc" as being published as a single, larger book. The first two-thirds of The Golden Torc occur at the same time as the events described in The Many Colored Land.
- The Nonborn King is the third book in the Saga of Pliocene Exile, and it introduces the character of Marc Remillard, the Angel of the Abyss, the Adversary, or Abaddon, who sought to overthrow the Galactic Milieu and make humanity supreme.
- The Adversary is the fourth and final book in the Saga of Pliocene Exile. A time gate back to the 21st century is opened, the Firvulag nearly beat the Tanu once and for all, and Marc Remillard's original scheme lives on in a slightly different form.
- Intervention (split into two volumes titled The Surveillance and The Metaconcert in some editions), published in the late 1980s. They discuss the very first operant Remillards, Rogatien [Rogi], Donatien [Don], Denis, and Victor, culminating with humanity contacting the Coadunate Galactic Milieu.
- The final three books – Jack the Bodiless, Diamond Mask, and Magnificat – are what May calls "the Galactic Milieu Trilogy". They discuss Marc Remillard's Metapsychic Rebellion.
- Julian May also wrote a "tenth" book, which was first published in 1984, called A Pliocene Companion. A Pliocene Companion is essentially a glossary/gazetteer for the four novels of the Pliocene Exile which May compiled to help her write those four books

== Reception ==
David J. Hayes reviewed Saga of Pliocene Exile in Pyramid #1 (May/June, 1993), and stated that "Exotic, complex and fascinatingly realistic, the world of the Exile is rich with adventure possibilities."

At the time of her death in 2017, Oscar-nominee Nick Dudman told Chicago Sun-Times writer Maureen O'Donnell that May's "...characters are wonderful, the sequencing is amazing, and the ideas behind the story are so bold" that he was developing her books for television.
