= The Many-Colored Land =

1981 novel by Julian May

- First edition
- Author: Julian May
- Cover artist: Ken Barr
- Language: English
- Series: Saga of Pliocene Exile
- Genre: science fiction novel
- Publisher: Houghton Mifflin
- Publication date: March 1981
- Publication place: United States
- Media type: Hardcover
- Pages: 415
- Awards: Locus Award
- ISBN: 0-395-30230-7
- OCLC: 6602471

The Many-Colored Land is a science fiction novel by American author Julian May, published in 1981. It is the first book of the Saga of Pliocene Exile (known as the Saga of the Exiles in the United Kingdom and the Commonwealth). The novel sets the series up by introducing the story of each of the characters. The main purpose of the book is to provide information for the rest of the series, only beginning the main storyline in its final part.

== Characters ==
=== Group Green ===
Elizabeth Orme
Elizabeth was a talented metapsychic practitioner on the human-colonised ski-resort planet Denali, but suffered severe injuries which resulted in the loss of her metapsychic abilities. Unable to cope with the trauma of this, she travelled to the Pliocene hoping to travel freely in a hot air balloon. But in an ironic twist, the shock of time travel caused her operant powers to return. The Tanu race regard her with awe as no other naturally operant metapsychics have come through the gate, and treat her as something of a celebrity. Elizabeth is a peace-loving redactor with little interest in politics, but her knowledge of advanced Milieu metapsychic techniques and her high level of metapsychic power make her an important player in the Tanu court, whether she likes it or not.

Aiken Drum
A persistent troublemaker, young Aiken Drum refused to bend to the will of society. Offered the choice of incarceration, docilization or euthanasia, he instead chose Exile to the Pliocene. Always landing on his feet, his quick wits and schemes earned him respect from his fellow time travelers, and his latent metapsychic abilities earned him a silver torc from the Tanu. But a greater future lies ahead for this maverick Scot.

Felice Landry
Felice is a tremendously talented athlete from the Canadian planet Acadie, with superhuman strength and an uncanny ability to control animals, which allowed her to dominate the planet-wide beloved sport of ring hockey. However she is also a borderline psychotic. She chooses to go into Exile when she is banned from her sport after two other players accused her of deliberately injuring them. In Exile she discovers her powers are stronger than she expected, but refuses to be tested by the Tanu and have this revealed. Later, Felice joins the Lowlives helping them discover that 'Blood-Metal' (aka iron) can kill the 'Exotics'. She is determined to get a Gold Torc, confident that it will make her powerful enough to take on the Tanu.

Richard Voorhees
Richard is a xenophobic ex-spacer who came to the Pliocene after being sued by an alien space crew who he refused to help whilst on a mission for a client. Richard tries to act tough throughout the book and often refuses to help other people, especially the Lowlives, but always comes through for them in the end. Richard is most notable in the book for being the first human to kill a Tanu, in the process discovering the fact that Tanu and Firvulag both are instantly killed upon contact with iron. He also flies the aircraft at the end of the book, as the only one with enough experience to work out how.

Bryan Grenfell
Bryan works as an anthropologist in the Galactic Milieu, but goes into Exile in pursuit of his love, Mercy. When he arrives in the Many Colored Land, he is regarded as special by the Tanu, who allow him to work bareneck without any torc, as he refuses to wear even a gold torc while he is there. He often quotes "There is a lady sweet and kind" by Thomas Ford:

There is a lady sweet and kind,
Was never face so pleas'd my mind;
I did but see her passing by,
And yet I love her till I die.

Stein Olsen
He is an ex-driller with deep psychological scars from the death of his mother. He is of immediate interest to the Tanu, who want him as a competitor in the ritual Great Combat, due to his heroic physique. With the help of Elizabeth, he is mentally healed by the human woman Sukey, with whom he falls in love.

Annamaria Roccaro
A nun who develops complex relationships with Claude and Felice.

Claude Majewski
A retired, widowed palaeontologist, planning to see the 'fossil Zoo'. (Majewski was May's father's original family name.)

=== Other human exiles ===
- Mercedes Lamballe

Bryan Grenfell's beloved, a woman of Celtic ancestry who never felt 'at home' in the Mileu goes into Exile and is discovered to have grandmaster-level latent creative metafunctions by the Tanu. Her power and beauty attract Nodonn Battlemaster who takes her as his wife and later proves that she has some Tanu ancestry in her DNA, causing shockwaves among Human and Tanu alike considering the 6-million year time gap between the Tanu/Firvulag ascendancy and the rise of Humanity, while also explaining how metafunctions manifested in the Human gene pool in the first place.

=== The Tanu ===
Lord Creyn
Creyn is a kindly redactor, a specialist in healing, who takes Elizabeth under his wing and appears to know of Marc's destiny.

Lord Velteyn
Aggressive and the leader of the Flying Hunt, Velteyn is the city lord of Finiah, site of the barium mine where the raw materials for torcs are produced.

Nodonn Battlemaster
Nodonn is a powerful psychokinetic and the battle champion of the Tanu, and the husband of Mercy, Bryan Grenfell's beloved.

Lady Epone
Epone is the cruel coercive Tanu lady who oversees the transport of some of the prisoners from Castle Gateway, and also conducts their psychic testing. She is the first Tanu to be killed in the book, at the hands of her prisoners armed with iron.

=== The Firvulag ===
Yeochee
King of the Firvulag

Pallol One Eye
Battlemaster, or military commander and champion of the Firvulag, and a "first-comer" thus over a millennium old at the time of the events of the series. Pallol was very tall, wide, and strong, called an "ogre". His cognomen came because one of his two eyes was usually patched because it could emit a devastating beam of "creativity".

Fitharn PegLeg
