= Bladnoch, Wigtownshire =

Village in south-west Scotland

Bladnoch: Scottish Gaelic: Blaidneach
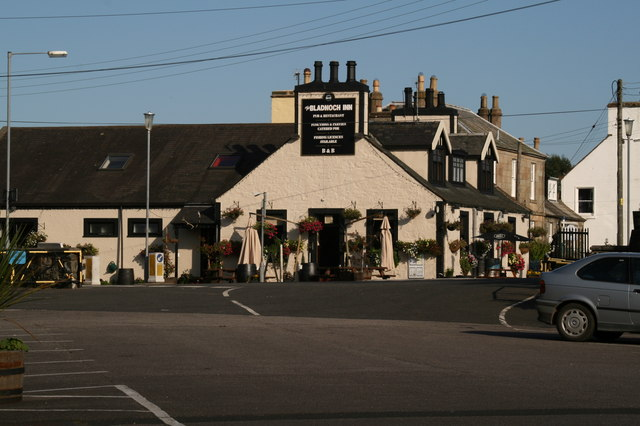
- Interactive map of Bladnoch
- Police
- Fire
- Ambulance

Bladnoch (Scottish Gaelic: Blaidneach) is a small village on the River Bladnoch in Wigtownshire, Scotland, located just outside the county town of Wigtown.

The River Bladnoch reaches the Bladnoch Distillery, which was established in 1817. The distillery sits on the North side of the river, just west of Bladnoch village.

== History ==
Dominican friars from Wigtown received fishing rights on the south bank of the river. James V granted them rights on the north bank in 1526 under a thirteen-year lease. The lease later became a permanent gift. A grain mill once stood there. Floods destroyed it in or before 1471. Workers rebuilt it in 1500.

In the 15th century a charter shows a request from Margaret, Countess of Galloway, for Papal Indulgences to be granted to any who would help in the building of a stone bridge across the Bladnoch. This was to help pilgrims on their way to Whithorn, as the existing wooden bridge was repeatedly swept away in floods. The bridge was not built until 1728 almost two hundred years after pilgrimages had finally ceased to take place.

In 1798 this village consisted of 10 or 12 thatched houses on both sides of the road from Wigtown to the ford of the river. The inhabitants of the houses of that period were all labourers. The old ford was no longer needed after the construction of the first bridge, near the distillery site.

At the south side of the bridge sat a public house known for its heavy drinking, rowdy behaviour, and fights. In 1743 the old innkeeper at "Blednoch Brig" was a man called Sawners McClurg. He allowed any kind of rowdy behaviour except fighting. If a fight began "he reached for a thick stick which he kept handy, stood up, gave the ground a thump with his stick and said "Quietness is best". He was a strong man and, when he did this, the room fell silent. A poem was carved on his gravestone:

Beneath lies Sawners McClurg

Enjoying his quiet rest

When he was alive he ay said

"Quietness was best".

By the late 18th century the Earl of Galloway owned salmon fishing rights from the river mouth to Torhouse. Salmon rarely swam above Torhouse in dry years. Rents rose steadily: £9, then £16, £24, and finally £33 by 1791. Fishermen caught salmon from March to October, with the best runs in June and July. Prices started at 4d per pound and later fell to 3d.Whales occasionally entered the river from Wigtown Bay. In 1674, during a famine year, villagers killed a large whale stranded on the sands and used its meat and oil.

When another bridge was built in 1867 the stone bridge lay derelict. The new bridge was first discussed, according to the Free Press, in 1850. In 1867 the paper issued news of its completion, and in 1868 carried an article reporting the costs. The stones of the old bridge were used in 1875 to construct a viaduct for the railway over the river east of the village.

=== 1877 economy ===
By 1877 Bladnoch was a large village consisting of one and two storey slated houses, all of which had been built in the 19th century. McClelland's Distillery and McClelland's Preserved Potato Manufactory and Farina Mill operated then. George McClelland, brother of Thomas and John McClelland who founded the distillery in 1817, founded the Starch Manufactory, Potato Mill or Farina Mill at Potato Mill road later. In 1842 it was described as sitting immediately south of Fordbank House, nearly half-a-mile north of Bladnoch Village. It was a considerable building; two stories high and built of stone, employing forty people. At that time the factory and Fordbank House were the property of Charles McClelland. Fordbank was described as "a house of two stories high and built of stone". Nearby were small outhouses and pleasure grounds. In 1841 the works were described as "a Farina Mill with extensive chemical works where a large number of men and women were employed in day and night shifts of work". The Mill operated from the mid 19th century until after World War I. The ground on which it stood was on lease from the Burgh of Wigtown, and when the mill closed the land reverted to the Burgh and was sold privately. In the Statistical Account of 1965 the Potato Mill is mentioned as demolished, causing a drop in potato production in the parish. The last McClelland belonging to the Potato Mill was George McClelland who owned Orchardton House in Wigtown.

Bladnoch supported several businesses:

- Withers coachworks built coaches of any size on short notice.
- William Anderson ran a large iron foundry and shipyard near the present garage. Workers there cast iron goods and launched boats into the river at the old ford.
- Robert Bennett owned a bakery and a vessel that traded between Wigtown and Whithorn.
- McClumpha father and son operated a drapery and tailoring shop for gentlemen’s clothing.
- George Paton ran a joiner and cartwright business.The village also had a post office, three grocers, two public houses, and a bowling green gifted by the Earl of Galloway.
