= Julian May =

American writer (1931–2017)

Julian Clare May
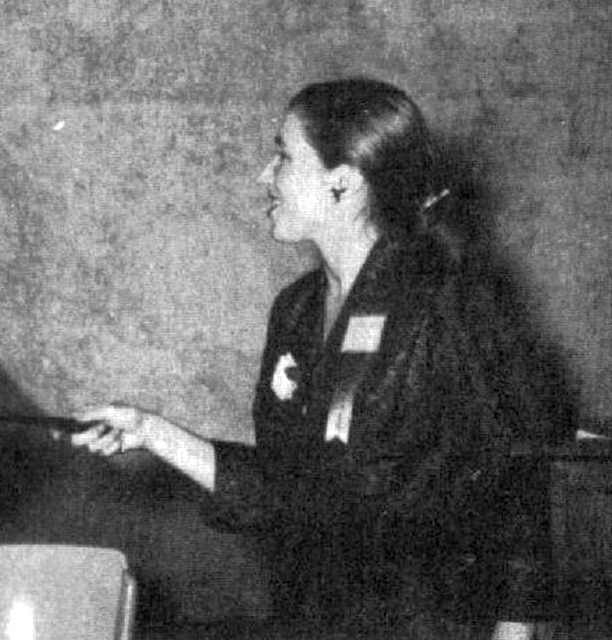
- Julian May at the 1952 World Science Fiction Convention
- Born: July 10, 1931; Chicago, Illinois, US
- Died: October 17, 2017 (aged 86)
- Occupations: Novelist, science writer
- Spouse: T. E. Dikty (1953–1991)
- Writing career
- Pen name: Bob Cunningham, Judy Dikty, Lee N. Falconer, John Feilen, Wolfgang Amadeus Futslogg, Matthew G. Grant, Granny Roseboro, Ian Thorne, Jean Wright Thorne, George Zanderbergen, The Editors of Creative
- Genres: fantasy, science fiction, horror, science, children's

Julian Clare May (July 10, 1931 – October 17, 2017) was an American science fiction, fantasy, horror, science and children's writer who also used several literary pseudonyms. She is best known for her Saga of Pliocene Exile (Saga of the Exiles in the United Kingdom) and Galactic Milieu Series books.

== Background and early career ==
Julian May grew up in Elmwood Park, Illinois, a suburb of Chicago, the oldest of four children. Her parents were Matthew M. May (originally Majewski) and Julia Feilen May; as a child she was known as Judy May.

She became involved in science fiction fandom in her late teens, publishing the fanzine Interim Newsletter for a time. She sold her first professional fiction, a short story called "Dune Roller", in 1950 to John W. Campbell's Astounding Science Fiction; it appeared in 1951, under the name "J. C. May", accompanied by her original illustrations.

She met her future husband, Ted Dikty, later that year at a convention in Ohio. May chaired the Tenth World Science Fiction Convention in Chicago in 1952, becoming the first woman to chair a worldcon, and married Dikty in January, 1953. After selling one more short story, "Star of Wonder" (to Thrilling Wonder Stories in 1953), she dropped out of the science fiction field for several years.

== Period outside science fiction ==
May and Dikty had three children, the last of whom was born in 1958. Starting in 1954, May wrote thousands of science encyclopedia articles for Consolidated Book Publishers; after finishing that project, she wrote similar articles for two other encyclopedia publishers. In 1957 she and her husband founded a production and editorial service for small publishers, Publication Associates; the most notable projects May wrote and edited during this period include two episodes of the Buck Rogers comic strip and a new Catholic catechism for Franciscan Herald Press, a publisher associated with the Order of Friars Minor. Between 1956 and 1981 she wrote more than 250 books for children and young adults, most non-fiction, under her own name and a variety of pseudonyms; the subjects included science, history, and short biographies of modern-day celebrities such as athletes and musical groups.

"Dune Roller" was filmed in 1972 as The Cremators, in which she was credited as "Judy Dikty".

== Return to science fiction ==
Having moved to Oregon in the early 1970s, May began to get reacquainted with the world of fandom; in 1976, she attended Westercon 29 in Los Angeles, her first science-fiction convention in many years. She made an elaborate diamond-encrusted "space suit" for the convention's costume party, which started her thinking about what sort of character would wear such a suit. She soon began accumulating a folder of ideas for what would become the Galactic Milieu Series, and in 1978 she began writing what would become the Saga of Pliocene Exile. The first book in that series, The Many-Colored Land, was published in 1981 by Houghton Mifflin. In 1987, she continued the series with Intervention, finally followed in 1992 (with a change in publisher) by the Galactic Milieu Series: Jack the Bodiless, Diamond Mask and Magnificat.

In August 2015, she was inducted into the First Fandom Hall of Fame in a ceremony at the 73rd World Science Fiction Convention.

== Bibliography (in alphabetical order of surname used as author) ==
=== Non-fiction under the name Lee N. Falconer ===
- The Gazeteer of the Hyborian World of Conan, (Starmont House, June 1977). ISBN 0-916732-01-0.

=== Adult fiction under the name Julian May ===
==== The Saga of Pliocene Exile ====
1. The Many-Colored Land (Boston: Houghton Mifflin, 1981). ISBN 0-395-30230-7.
2. The Golden Torc (Boston: Houghton Mifflin, 1982). ISBN 0-395-31261-2.
3. The Nonborn King (Boston: Houghton Mifflin, 1983). ISBN 0-395-32211-1.
4. The Adversary (Boston: Houghton Mifflin, 1984). ISBN 0-395-34410-7.

==== The Galactic Milieu Series ====
1. Intervention: A Root Tale to the Galactic Milieu and a Vinculum between it and The Saga of Pliocene Exile (Boston: Houghton Mifflin, 1987). ISBN 0-395-43782-2. (Paperback edition released in the US as two volumes, Surveillance and Metaconcert; UK paperback released as a single volume under the original title by Pan Books.)
  - Surveillance (Intervention no. 1) as separate paperback from Metaconcert.
  - Metaconcert (Intervention no. 2) as separate paperback from Surveillance (Del Rey, January 13, 1989). ISBN 0-345-35524-5.
2. Jack the Bodiless (New York: Knopf, 1991). ISBN 0-679-40950-5.
3. Diamond Mask (New York: Knopf, 1994). ISBN 0-679-43310-4.
4. Magnificat (New York: Knopf, 1996). ISBN 0-679-44177-8.

==== Trillium ====
The Trillium series began as a three-way collaboration. After the first book, each of the three authors continued the series on her own.

1. Marion Zimmer Bradley, Julian May, and Andre Norton, Black Trillium (New York: Doubleday, 1990). ISBN 0-385-26185-3.
2. Blood Trillium (New York: Bantam, 1992). ISBN 0-553-08851-3.
3. Sky Trillium (New York: Del Rey, 1997). ISBN 0-345-38000-2.

==== The Rampart Worlds ====
1. Perseus Spur (New York: Ballantine, 1999). ISBN 0-345-39510-7. (First published 1998 in UK.)
2. Orion Arm (New York: Ballantine, 1999). ISBN 0-345-39519-0.
3. Sagittarius Whorl: An Adventure of the Rampart Worlds (New York: Ballantine, 2001). ISBN 0-345-39518-2.

==== Boreal Moon ====
1. Conqueror's Moon (New York: Ace, 2004). ISBN 0-441-01132-2.
2. Ironcrown Moon (New York: Ace, 2005). ISBN 0-441-01244-2.
3. Sorcerer's Moon (New York: Ace, 2006). ISBN 0-441-01383-X.

=== Juvenile fiction under the name Julian May ===
These books were written for Popular Mechanics Press in the late 1950s.

1. There's Adventure in Automobiles (Popular Mechanics Press, 1961)
2. There's Adventure in Astronautics (Popular Mechanics Press, 1961)
3. There's Adventure in Marine Science (Popular Mechanics Press, 1959)
4. There's Adventure in Jet Aircraft (Popular Mechanics Press, 1959)
5. There's Adventure in Geology (Popular Mechanics Press, 1959)
6. There's Adventure in Rockets (Popular Mechanics Press, 1958)
7. There's Adventure in Electronics (Popular Mechanics Press, 1957)
8. There's Adventure in Chemistry (Popular Mechanics Press, 1957)
9. There's Adventure in Atomic Energy (Popular Mechanics Press, 1957)

=== Works under the name Ian Thorne ===
- The Blob (1982)
- The Deadly Mantis (1982)
- It Came from Outer Space (1982)
- Frankenstein Meets Wolfman (1981)
- Creature from the Black Lagoon (1981)
- The Mummy (1981)
- Godzilla (1977)
- Frankenstein (1977)
- Dracula (1977)
- The Wolf Man (1977)

=== Biographies ===
- Pelé World Soccer Star (1978)

== General sources ==
- Dikty, Thaddeus; R. Reginald (1985). The Work of Julian May: An Annotated Bibliography and Guide. Bibliographies of Modern Authors No. 3. Borgo Press. ISBN 0-89370-482-2.
- May, Julian (1984). A Pliocene Companion. Boston: Houghton Mifflin. pp. 181–207. ISBN 0-395-36516-3.
