= List of joint winners of the Hugo and Nebula awards =

This is a list of the works that have won both the Hugo Award and the Nebula Award, given annually to works of science fiction or fantasy literature. The Hugo Awards are voted on by science-fiction fans at the World Science Fiction Convention (Worldcon); the Nebula Awards—given by the Science Fiction and Fantasy Writers of America (SFWA)—began in 1966, making that the first year joint winners were possible.

The categories are defined by number of words, as follows:

- Novel: >39,999 words
- Novella: 17,500 - 39,999 words
- Novelette: 7,500 - 17,499 words
- Short story: <7,500 words

Hugo awards are denoted by the year the award is presented, while Nebulas are denoted by the year of publication. This means that the years of the awards will be different for any given work. Prior to 2009 there was an additional complication that works were eligible for the Nebula for more than a single calendar year. For recent awards, only one date is shown below.

== Novel ==
- 1966/1965 Novel: Dune by Frank Herbert
- 1970/1969 Novel: The Left Hand of Darkness by Ursula K. Le Guin
- 1971/1970 Novel: Ringworld by Larry Niven
- 1973/1972 Novel: The Gods Themselves by Isaac Asimov
- 1974/1973 Novel: Rendezvous with Rama by Arthur C. Clarke
- 1975/1974 Novel: The Dispossessed by Ursula K. Le Guin
- 1976/1975 Novel: The Forever War by Joe Haldeman
- 1978/1977 Novel: Gateway by Frederik Pohl
- 1979/1978 Novel: Dreamsnake by Vonda McIntyre
- 1980/1979 Novel: The Fountains of Paradise by Arthur C. Clarke
- 1984/1983 Novel: Startide Rising by David Brin
- 1985/1984 Novel: Neuromancer by William Gibson
- 1986/1985 Novel: Ender's Game by Orson Scott Card
- 1987/1986 Novel: Speaker for the Dead by Orson Scott Card
- 1993/1992 Novel: Doomsday Book by Connie Willis
- 1999/1998 Novel: Forever Peace by Joe Haldeman
- 2003/2002 Novel: American Gods by Neil Gaiman
- 2005/2004 Novel: Paladin of Souls by Lois McMaster Bujold
- 2008 Novel: The Yiddish Policemen's Union by Michael Chabon
- 2010 Novel: The Windup Girl by Paolo Bacigalupi
- 2011 Novel: Blackout/All Clear by Connie Willis
- 2012 Novel: Among Others by Jo Walton
- 2014 Novel: Ancillary Justice by Ann Leckie
- 2018 Novel: The Stone Sky by N. K. Jemisin
- 2019 Novel: The Calculating Stars by Mary Robinette Kowal
- 2021 Novel: Network Effect by Martha Wells

== Novella ==
- 1971/1970 Novella: Ill Met in Lankhmar by Fritz Leiber
- 1976/1975 Novella: Home Is the Hangman by Roger Zelazny
- 1977/1976 Novella: Houston, Houston, Do You Read? by James Tiptree, Jr.
- 1978/1977 Novella: Stardance by Spider and Jeanne Robinson
- 1979/1978 Novella: The Persistence of Vision by John Varley
- 1980/1979 Novella: Enemy Mine by Barry B. Longyear
- 1982/1981 Novella: The Saturn Game by Poul Anderson
- 1985/1984 Novella: Press Enter by John Varley
- 1989/1988 Novella: The Last of the Winnebagos by Connie Willis
- 1990/1989 Novella: The Mountains of Mourning by Lois McMaster Bujold
- 1991/1990 Novella: The Hemingway Hoax by Joe Haldeman
- 1992/1991 Novella: Beggars in Spain by Nancy Kress
- 1995/1994 Novella: Seven Views of Olduvai Gorge by Mike Resnick
- 2002/2001 Novella: The Ultimate Earth by Jack Williamson
- 2003 Novella: Coraline by Neil Gaiman
- 2012 Novella: The Man Who Bridged the Mist by Kij Johnson
- 2016 Novella: Binti by Nnedi Okorafor
- 2017 Novella: Every Heart a Doorway by Seanan McGuire
- 2018 Novella: All Systems Red by Martha Wells
- 2020 Novella: This Is How You Lose the Time War, by Amal El-Mohtar and Max Gladstone
- 2026 Novella: The River Has Roots, by Amal El-Mohtar

== Novelette ==
- 1968/1967 Novelette: "Gonna Roll the Bones" by Fritz Leiber
- 1973/1972 Novelette: "Goat Song" by Poul Anderson
- 1977/1976 Novelette: "The Bicentennial Man" by Isaac Asimov
- 1980/1979 Novelette: "Sandkings" by George R. R. Martin
- 1983/1982 Novelette: "Fire Watch" by Connie Willis
- 1984/1983 Novelette: "Blood Music" by Greg Bear
- 1985/1984 Novelette: "Bloodchild" by Octavia E. Butler
- 1989/1988 Novelette: "Schrödinger's Kitten" by George Alec Effinger
- 1994/1993 Novelette: "Georgia On My Mind" by Charles Sheffield
- 1995/1994 Novelette: "The Martian Child" by David Gerrold
- 2003/2002 Novelette: "Hell Is the Absence of God" by Ted Chiang
- 2006/2005 Novelette: "The Faery Handbag" by Kelly Link
- 2007/2006 Novelette: "Two Hearts" by Peter S. Beagle
- 2008 Novelette: "The Merchant and the Alchemist's Gate" by Ted Chiang
- 2021 Novelette: "Two Truths and a Lie" by Sarah Pinsker
- 2024 Novelette: "The Year Without Sunshine" by Naomi Kritzer

== Short Story ==
- 1966/1965 Short Fiction/Short Story: ""Repent, Harlequin!" Said the Ticktockman" by Harlan Ellison
- 1976/1975 Short Story: "Catch that Zeppelin!" by Fritz Leiber
- 1978/1977 Short Story: "Jeffty Is Five" by Harlan Ellison
- 1981/1980 Short Story: "Grotto of the Dancing Deer" by Clifford D. Simak
- 1987/1986 Short Story: "Tangents" by Greg Bear
- 1991/1990 Short Story: "Bears Discover Fire" by Terry Bisson
- 1993/1992 Short Story: "Even the Queen" by Connie Willis
- 2012 Short Story: "The Paper Menagerie" by Ken Liu
- 2017 Short Story: "Seasons of Glass and Iron" by Amal El-Mohtar
- 2018 Short Story: "Welcome to Your Authentic Indian Experience™" by Rebecca Roanhorse
- 2022 Short Story: "Where Oaken Hearts Do Gather" by Sarah Pinsker
- 2023 Short Story: "Rabbit Test" by Samantha Mills (Note: Mills subsequently disavowed the Hugo Award due to the controversy regarding the ballot.)

== Dramatic Presentation, Long Form ==
- 1974/1975 Dramatic Presentation/Script: Sleeper by Woody Allen
- 1975/1976 Dramatic Presentation/Script: Young Frankenstein, written by Mel Brooks and Gene Wilder, directed by Brooks
- 1978/1978 Dramatic Presentation/Script: Star Wars by George Lucas
- 2000/2001 Dramatic Presentation/Script: Galaxy Quest by David Howard and Robert Gordon
- 2001/2002 Dramatic Presentation/Script: Crouching Tiger, Hidden Dragon by James Schamus, Kuo Jung Tsai and Hui-Ling Wang
- 2002/2003 Dramatic Presentation/Script: The Lord of the Rings: The Fellowship of the Ring, written and directed by Peter Jackson
- 2003/2004 Dramatic Presentation, Long Form/Script: The Lord of the Rings: The Two Towers, written and directed by Peter Jackson
- 2004/2005 Dramatic Presentation, Long Form/Script: The Lord of the Rings: The Return of the King, written and directed by Peter Jackson
- 2006/2006 Dramatic Presentation, Long Form/Script: Serenity, written and directed by Joss Whedon
- 2007/2008 Dramatic Presentation, Long Form/Script: Pan's Labyrinth, written and directed by Guillermo del Toro
- 2009/2009 Dramatic Presentation, Long Form/Script: WALL-E, written by Andrew Stanton and Jim Reardon, directed by Stanton, story by Stanton and Pete Docter
- 2011/2010 Dramatic Presentation, Long Form/Outstanding Dramatic Presentation: Inception, written and directed by Christopher Nolan
- 2014/2013 Dramatic Presentation, Long Form/Outstanding Dramatic Presentation: Gravity, written by Alfonso Cuarón and Jonás Cuarón, directed by Alfonso Cuarón
- 2015/2014 Dramatic Presentation, Long Form/Outstanding Dramatic Presentation: Guardians of the Galaxy, written by James Gunn and Nicole Perlman, directed by James Gunn
- 2017/2016 Dramatic Presentation, Long Form/Outstanding Dramatic Presentation: Arrival, written by Eric Heisserer, directed by Denis Villeneuve, original story by Ted Chiang
- 2019/2018 Dramatic Presentation, Long Form/Outstanding Dramatic Presentation: Spider-Man: Into the Spider-Verse, written by Rodney Rothman and Phil Lord, directed by Bob Persichetti, Peter Ramsey and Rodney Rothman
- 2023/2022 Dramatic Presentation, Long Form/Outstanding Dramatic Presentation: Everything Everywhere All at Once, written and directed by Daniel Kwan and Daniel Scheinert
- 2025/2024 Dramatic Presentation, Long Form/Outstanding Dramatic Presentation: Dune: Part Two, written by Jon Spaihts and Denis Villeneuve, directed by Denis Villeneuve

== Dramatic Presentation, Short Form ==
- 2012/2011 Dramatic Presentation, Short Form/Outstanding Dramatic Presentation: Doctor Who: "The Doctor's Wife" written by Neil Gaiman, directed by Richard Clark
- 2021 Dramatic Presentation, Short Form/Outstanding Dramatic Presentation: The Good Place: "Whenever You're Ready" written and directed by Michael Schur

== Game ==
- 2021 Video Game/Game Writing: Hades
- 2024 Game or Interactive Work/Game Writing: Baldur's Gate 3
- 2026 Game or Interactive Work/Game Writing: Clair Obscur: Expedition 33

== Young Adult fiction ==
The Lodestar Award is presented at the Hugo Award ceremony at the Worldcon, although it is not itself a Hugo Award.

- 2019 Lodestar Award/Andre Norton Award: Children of Blood and Bone by Tomi Adeyemi
- 2021 Lodestar Award/Andre Norton Award: A Wizard's Guide to Defensive Baking by Ursula Vernon (as T. Kingfisher)

== Multiple Categories ==
- 1967/1966 Novelette/Novella: The Last Castle by Jack Vance
- 1972/1971 Novella/Novelette: The Queen of Air and Darkness by Poul Anderson
- 1970/1969 Short Story/Novelette: Time Considered as a Helix of Semi-Precious Stones by Samuel R. Delany
- 1971/1970 Short Story/Novelette: Slow Sculpture by Theodore Sturgeon

== Related ==
Awards given to two different but related works.

- In 1960, Daniel Keyes won a Hugo for his short story "Flowers for Algernon". He later expanded it into a novel which won the Nebula for Best Novel in 1966.
- In 2020, the TV series Good Omens, written by Neil Gaiman and directed by Douglas Mackinnon, won a Hugo for Best Dramatic Presentation, Long Form, while the episode "Hard Times" won the Ray Bradbury Nebula Award for Outstanding Dramatic Presentation.
- In 2026, the TV series Murderbot, written by Chris Weitz and Paul Weitz, won the Ray Bradbury Nebula Award for Outstanding Dramatic Presentation, while the episode "All Systems Red" won a Hugo for Best Dramatic Presentation, Short Form.
