= Impossible Things =

1994 short story collection by Connie Willis

- First edition cover
- Author: Connie Willis
- Genre: Short story collection
- Publication date: January 1994
- ISBN: 0-553-56436-6

Impossible Things is a collection of short stories by American writer Connie Willis, first published in January 1994, that includes tales of ecological disaster, humorous satire, tragedy, and satirical alternate realities. Its genres range from comedy to tragedy to horror. Three of the stories won Nebula Awards, and two won Hugo Awards.

Like her novel Bellwether, the stories In the Late Cretaceous and At the Rialto explore aspects of scientific research. Like All Seated on the Ground, the story Spice Pogrom involves first contact with an intelligent alien species. Like the two-part novel Blackout/All Clear, the story of Jack involves life during The Blitz. The stories Ado and Winter's Tale both refer to William Shakespeare, while Time Out, like her time travel novels, explores the nature of time.

== Contents ==
- "The Last of the Winnebagos" (1988)
- "Even the Queen" (1992)
- "Schwarzschild Radius" (1987)
- "Ado" (1988)
- "Spice Pogrom" (1986)
- "Winter's Tale" (1988)
- "Chance" (1986)
- "In the Late Cretaceous" (1991)
- "Time Out" (1989)
- "Jack" (1991)
- "At the Rialto" (1989)

== Awards ==
Awards for Impossible Things
Year	Story	Award	Result	Ref.
1987	"Spice Pogrom"	Hugo Award for Best Novella	Nominated	
1988	"Schwarzschild Radius"	Nebula Award for Best Novelette	Nominated	
1989	"At the Rialto"	Nebula Award for Best Novelette	Won	
1989	"The Last of the Winnebagos"	Hugo Award for Best Novella	Won	
1989	"The Last of the Winnebagos"	Nebula Award for Best Novella	Won	
1990	"At the Rialto"	Hugo Award for Best Novelette	Nominated	
1990	"Time Out"	Hugo Award for Best Novella	Nominated	
1992	"In the Late Cretaceous"	Hugo Award for Best Short Story	Nominated	
1992	"Jack"	Hugo Award for Best Novella	Nominated	
1992	"Jack"	Nebula Award for Best Novella	Nominated	
1993	"Even the Queen"	Hugo Award for Best Short Story	Won	
1993	"Even the Queen"	Nebula Award for Best Short Story	Won	
1994	Collection as a whole	Locus Award for Best Collection	Won	
