= Fire Watch (book) =

1984 short story collection by Connie Willis

- First edition (publ. Bluejay Books); Cover art by Thomas Kidd
- Author: Connie Willis
- Genre: Short story collection
- Publisher: Bluejay Books
- Publication date: February 1, 1984

Fire Watch is a 1984 collection of science-fiction short stories by Connie Willis that touches on time travel, nuclear war, the end of the world, and cornball humor.

The title story, "Fire Watch", is about a time-travelling history student who goes back to the Blitz in London for his final project. He is miffed because he has spent years preparing to travel with St. Paul but instead is sent to St. Paul's Cathedral centuries later. During his time in the past, he is assigned to a crew that watches over the cathedral during bombing raids for any fires, which they then put out amid dangerous conditions. The story examines the lessons he learns about the harsh realities of time travel and the permanence of the past. This model of time travel also features in Willis's subsequent novels Doomsday Book, To Say Nothing of the Dog and Blackout/All Clear, set in the same continuity.

== Contents ==
- "Fire Watch"
- "Service for the Burial of the Dead"
- "Lost and Found"
- "All My Darling Daughters"
- "The Father of the Bride"
- "A Letter from the Clearys"
- "The Sidon in the Mirror"
- "And Come from Miles Around"
- "Daisy, in the Sun"
- "Mail Order Clone"
- "Samaritan"
- "Blued Moon"

This was Connie Willis's first collection.

== Reception ==
David Pringle rated Fire Watch three stars out of four and described Willis as a "talented new writer".

Awards for Fire Watch stories
Year	Story	Award	Result
1980	"Daisy, in the Sun"	Hugo Award for Best Short Story	
1983	"A Letter from the Clearys"	Nebula Award for Best Short Story	
1983	"Fire Watch"	Hugo Award for Best Novelette	
1983	"Fire Watch"	Nebula Award for Best Novelette	
1984	"The Sidon in the Mirror"	Hugo Award for Best Novelette	
1984	"The Sidon in the Mirror"	Nebula Award for Best Novelette	
1985	"Blued Moon"	Hugo Award for Best Novelette	
