= 1988 in science fiction =

The year 1988 was marked, in science fiction, by the following:

== Events ==
- The 46th annual Worldcon, Nolacon II, was held in New Orleans, USA

== Births and deaths ==
=== Births ===
- Pierce Brown

=== Deaths ===
- Robert A. Heinlein
- Clifford D. Simak

== Literary releases ==
=== Novels ===
- Mona Lisa Overdrive, by William Gibson
- Wetware, by Rudy Rucker

=== Comics ===
- Berserk, by Kentaro Miura

== Movies ==
- Akira, dir. by Katsuhiro Otomo
- They Live, dir. by John Carpenter

== Television ==
- La Hora Marcada
- Red Dwarf

== Video games ==
- Snatcher
- Wasteland

== Other Media ==
- Cyberpunk, table-top role-playing game, designed by Mike Pondsmith

== Awards ==
=== Hugos ===
- Best novel: The Uplift War, by David Brin
- Best novella: Eye for Eye, by Orson Scott Card
- Best novelette: "Buffalo Gals, Won't You Come Out Tonight", by Ursula K. LeGuin
- Best short story: "Why I Left Harry's All-Night Hamburgers", by Lawrence Watt-Evans
- Best related work: Michael Whelan's Works of Wonder, by Michael Whelan
- Other Forms: Watchmen, by Alan Moore and Dave Gibbons
- Best dramatic presentation: The Princess Bride, dir. by Rob Reiner; Screenplay by William Goldman; based on his novel
- Best professional editor: Gardner Dozois
- Best professional artist: Michael Whelan
- Best Semiprozine: Locus, ed. by Charles N. Brown
- Best fanzine: Texas SF Enquirer, ed. by Pat Mueller
- Best fan writer: Mike Glyer
- Best fan artist: Brad W. Foster

=== Nebulas ===
- Best novel: Falling Free, by Lois McMaster Bujold
- Best novella: The Last of the Winnebagos, by Connie Willis
- Best novelette: "Schrodinger's Kitten", by George Alec Effinger
- Best short story: "Bible Stories for Adults, No. 17: The Deluge", by James Morrow

=== Other awards ===
- Arthur C. Clarke Award: The Seam and Summer, by George Turner
- BSFA Award for Best Novel: Lavondyss, by Robert Holdstock
- Locus Award for Best Science Fiction Novel: The Uplift War, by David Brin
- Saturn Award for Best Science Fiction Film: Alien Nation
