= Bird stump vase =

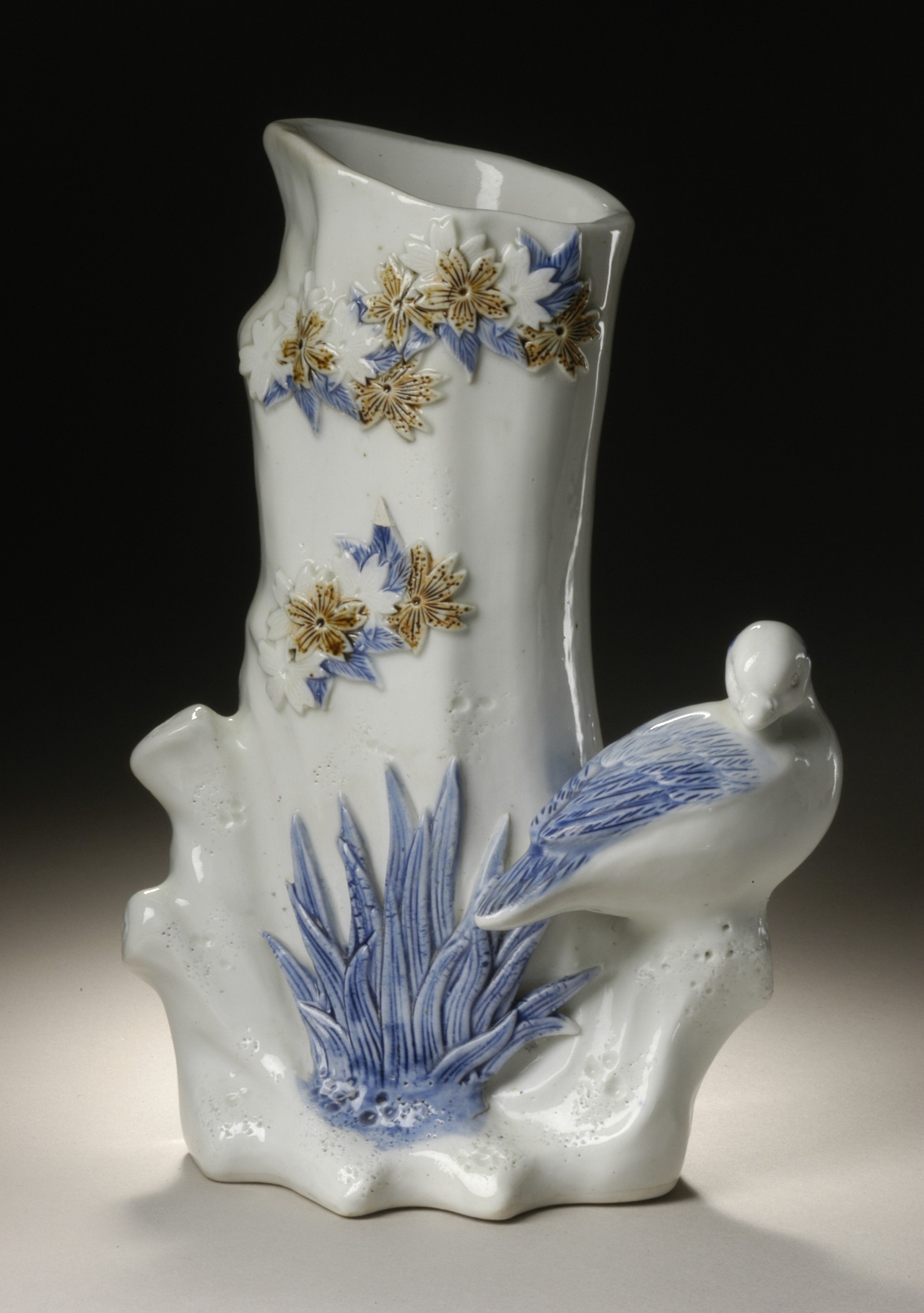
Tree-stump vase with seated duck, Hirado ware, 19th century.

A bird stump is a type of vase made in the shape of a tree stump with a bird sitting on or next to it. The branches forking from the main trunk are chopped off short and form tubes into which the stems of flowers can be inserted. The most elaborate versions have multiple branches and vines twining around the trunk. Bird stumps are generally made of ceramics like porcelain, though some are made of cast iron. They were popular from the Victorian period up through the 1920s in England.

A so-called bird stump (actually a "figural urn" [sic]) plays a role as the MacGuffin in Connie Willis's 1998 time travel science fiction novel To Say Nothing of the Dog: or, How We Found the Bishop's Bird Stump at Last.
