= Uncharted Territory =

Generally, uncharted territory is territory not found on nautical charts. Uncharted Territory may refer to:

- Uncharted Territory (novella), a 1994 science fiction novella by Connie Willis
- Uncharted Territory (album), a 2011 album by Don Moen
- Uncharted Territory, LLC, a film production company based in Los Angeles, California
- Uncharted Territories, a term relating to the Australian-American science fiction television series Farscape
- Uncharted Territory, a BBC television show presented by Juliet Morris
- Uncharted Territory, an independent music radio show broadcast by WZAT radio station
