= Inside Job (novella) =

- Short story by Connie Willis
- Country: United States
- Language: English
- Genre: Speculative fiction

Publication
- Published in: Asimov's Science Fiction
- Publication type: Periodical
- Publisher: Dell Magazines
- Media type: Print (Magazine), Online
- Publication date: January 2005

Inside Job
- Inside Job hardback cover
- Author: Connie Willis
- Language: English
- Genre: Speculative fiction
- Publisher: Subterranean Press
- Publication date: August 2005
- Publication place: United States
- Media type: Print (hardback)
- Pages: 99 pp.
- ISBN: 978-1-59606-024-1
- OCLC: 61411431

Inside Job is a novella by American writer Connie Willis, originally published in the January 2005 issue of Asimov's Science Fiction and later as a hardback by Subterranean Press. In the story, a debunker of pseudoscience encounters a fake medium who seems to be genuinely channelling the disruptive spirit of H. L. Mencken. It was the winner of the 2006 Hugo Award for Best Novella.

== Reception ==
Publishers Weekly in their review said that "while not as tightly woven as one of Willis's typical short stories nor as layered as her novels (Passage, etc.), this novella is still highly enjoyable, somewhat educational and will leave readers happy at the end." Ray Olson in his review for Booklist said that "Willis, one of sf's most spirited writers, rounds on the New Age; pays tribute to a great, skeptical journalist; and affectionately parodies pulp fiction at its best (Fredric Brown, that would be) in this irresistible entertainment." Jackie Cassady in her review for Library Journal said that "Willis grows even better in her short fiction, bringing to this novella both richness and integrity."
