= Crosstalk (novel) =

2016 novel by Connie Willis

- Author: Connie Willis
- Language: English
- Genre: Science fiction
- Publisher: Del Rey
- Publication date: 2016
- Publication place: United States
- Media type: Print (hardback & paperback)
- Pages: 480
- ISBN: 0345540689

Crosstalk is a science fiction novel by Connie Willis, published in 2016. It is a romantic comedy that explores the intersection of telephones and telepathy. In a similar situation to Bellwether and Passage, the main character, Briddey Flannigan, is part of a larger institution who gets caught up in series of escalating events. Additionally, Crosstalk like Bellwether and Passage feature themes of neuroscience, communication and technology.

== Plot ==
Bridget "Briddey" Flannigan, a middle manager in fictional tech-company CommSpan, is dating Trent Worth, one of the senior executives, while fending off nosy family and gossipy colleagues. The company is attempting to find a breakout competitor to the iPhone and other telecommunication products. Trent proposes that Briddey and he undergo a new procedure, an EED implant, which would allow the two of them to feel each other's emotions and take their relationship to the next level. Briddey consents.

Briddey arrives at work the day after, finding that the staff know her news already and have lots of unwanted advice to give. She takes refuge in her office, and finds a note from C.B. Schwarz, the company's disheveled technical genius, who seems to live like a hermit in the building's basement lab. She also gets text messages from her two sisters, Mary Clare and Kathleen, her Aunt Oona, and Mary Clare's 9 year-old daughter Maeve, who wants Briddey to stop her mother from ruining her life. Aunt Oona, who lives like a stereotypical Irish woman despite never having set foot in the old country, wants Briddey to dump Trent for a "foine Irish lad" such as Sean O'Reilly.

C.B. Schwarz tells Briddey that having the EED procedure is a very bad idea. With everybody drowning in communications she doesn't need more, and there could be "UIC's" or unintended consequences. He sends Briddey notes about surgeries that went disastrously wrong to discourage her.

Briddey initially believes that the procedure might not happen for over a year, but soon discovers that the schedule has been moved up and it will happen in days. She goes to great lengths to hide it from family and co-workers. After the operation she waits for "feelings" to start arriving from Trent, but instead hears a voice in her head. The voice belongs to C.B. Schwarz.

Briddey panics, convinced that C.B. is either in the room or has bugged it, leaves her bed and gets lost in a cold stairwell, is rescued by staff, and is visited by C.B., who calms her down and tells her to keep quiet about hearing his voice. Briddey spends the remainder of her stay dodging questions from the staff, the surgeon and Trent, while dealing with messages from her family, who think she is at her office. C.B. offers helpful, but mostly unwelcome suggestions via telepathy. At her discharge she is picked up by C.B., since Trent is in a Meeting.

C.B. tries to convince Briddey that the telepathy is real, and she needs to take him seriously. Back at the office, she starts hearing other voices, causing C.B. to urge her to work on some "defenses" and avoid crowds. He admits that he has been dealing with hearing voices since he was thirteen years old. However Briddey is suspicious of his motives, thinking he has romantic designs on her and is using some technical trickery to interfere with her relationship with Trent. She accepts an invitation to accompany Trent to the theater as the guest of the company CEO. At the theater she is overwhelmed by a flood of thoughts from the people around her. She collapses in the ladies room and contacts C.B. to help her. He arrives and gets her away, while texting plausible excuses to Trent on her phone. They go to the local university library where people reading produce a gentle background instead of a flood. There C.B. tells Briddey that he can teach her to shut out the thoughts of others, although he lives in isolation because of the effort involved.

Briddey learns to erect a perimeter around her mind and have an imaginary safe room to take refuge in. She even finds a way to tune in to other people's thoughts using an imaginary radio. This reveals to her that Trent's interest in her is part of a company project to use the EED's potential in a smartphone application.

Then Trent himself begins contacting her telepathically, as C.B. did. Briddey has to keep him at a distance while concealing her contacts with, and growing feelings for, C.B. Trent insists on involving the neurosurgeon, Dr. Verrick, but when Verrick returns from his globe-trotting visits to his celebrity clients, Briddey realizes that he may be involved in the scheme. With C.B.'s help, she must conceal the telepathy from Trent, Verrick and any others who may try to exploit her, C.B., and even her own family.

== Characters ==
- Briddey Flannigan is of Irish descent with red hair. She has a management position at CommSpan with an assistant, Charla. She is the only person that the company's tech genius, C.B. Schwarz will talk to, although it means meeting him in his freezing cold basement laboratory.
- C.B. Schwarz is the resident genius at CommSpan. He has dark hair and dark colored eyes, but is also of Irish descent, giving his actual name as Conlan Brenagh Patrick Michael O'Hanlon Schwarz, the last part being the name he took from his step-father. He believes that the Irish are the last to possess the telepathy gene, which died out in all other peoples. He sees the ability as a neural pathway that can be established, reinforced with practice, but also inhibited. His ability forces him to be isolated from society, acting and dressing like a hermit.
- Trent Worth is an executive at CommSpan with expensive tastes and a desire for the finer things. He is constantly interrupted by important phone calls. Despite his ulterior motive in courting Briddey, he genuinely believes that they have the emotional connection necessary to make the EED implant work.
- Kathleen Flannigan is Briddey's sister whose love life is a mess, consisting of a string of relationships with men who are either averse to commitment or actually cheating.
- Mary Clare is Briddey's other sister, mother to Maeve. She wants Maeve to grow up strong and independent, so she actively interferes in her life to stop her reading or watching unsuitable things like the movie Tangled where women have to be rescued by men. She alternately believes that Maeve is anorexic or that she is eating too much sugary cereal. She will interpret the most innocent observation as a reason to stage an intervention.
- Maeve is 9 years old, highly intelligent and resentful of her mother's interference. She secretly watches and reads all the things her mother disapproves of, bypassing all the locks on her computer. She is also a fan of zombie movies. Her texts to Briddey alternate between "Pay no attention to Mother!" and "What did you tell Mother?!".
- Aunt Oona affects a stereotypical Irish persona, wearing tweed skirts and knitted shawls and talking in a brogue probably learned from movies, since she has never been to Ireland. Her activities consist of pestering her family and attending meetings of the Daughters of Ireland, where they have readings of Gaelic poetry. However the facade conceals a surprising fact.
- Suki Parker is the resident Gossip Girl at CommSpan. Anything she hears is broadcast to everybody else within minutes. Briddey is of the opinion that if the company wants to revolutionize communications, they should learn from Suki.
- Jill Quincy is another company gossip who feeds Suki anything she hears.
- Sean O'Reilly is an unseen character who is Oona's ideal of a "foine Irish lad", but who seems unattractive given that he is approaching the age of 40, balding and lives with his mother. Like Aunt Oona herself, he is not what he seems to be.
- Dr. Verrick is a neurosurgeon, specializing in the "EED procedure", whose clients are mostly A-list celebrities like "Brad and Angelina" and Kardashians, as well as wealthy people, royalty and politicians in other countries. Although he is usually booked months ahead, he unexpectedly elects to treat Briddey and Trent on short notice after receiving their medical details and physical descriptions.

== Reception ==
Amal El-Mohtar at NPR Books argued that the book was "not a great showcase" for Connie Willis's oeuvre. However, Eric Brown of The Guardian was more laudatory, writing that "Willis tells a fast-paced tale with well-observed dialogue and some gentle humour."

== Cultural references ==
Through its various characters, the novel satirizes and parodies the influence of smartphones, streaming services and social media on people.

- Maeve's mother Mary Clare constantly worries about Maeve's use of streaming media to watch material such as zombie movies, fairy tales etc. while also believing that she will fall under the influence of terrorists via the World Wide Web. Even old novels such as The Secret Garden cause her concern. Mary Clare herself gets misinformation from the internet, which amplifies her worries for Maeve and also for Briddey, with respect to the EED.
- Maeve watches movies with titles like Zombienado and Zombie Girls Gone Wild, parodying titles such as Sharknado. She refers to plot points in the movies Frozen and Tangled in conversations about what she is allowed to do.
- Briddey's sister Kathleen, in her search for love, uses both real and fictional dating apps. The fictional ones include Lattes'n'Luv for meetings over coffee only, It's Only Brunch, JustDinner, HookUp.com, Hit'n'Ms., and RollTheDice, for those who prefer random encounters.
- Trent Worth is constantly distracted by calls on his smartphone, while Briddey has to pretend to receive calls to escape from conversations, or end calls by pretending to have another call coming in. C.B. designs apps that provide fake incoming calls to deflect unwanted conversations, or that route unwanted calls to other numbers, such as the Department of Motor Vehicles.
- Suki Parker not only gossips about everyone in CommSpan, but also is likely to post anything she learns on social media and use anything she finds on social media in her gossip.
- Briddey needs to get to a hotel parking lot to retrieve her car, left there during her hospital stay, without being noticed. C.B. provides her with a latte to carry in, so she looks like she is on her way to a meeting. People in the lobby are too preoccupied with their smartphones to notice.

C.B. Schwarz keeps posters in his lab. One is of the movie star Hedy Lamarr, who also devised the frequency hopping technique to avoid interception of communications, which is a concept referred to in the novel. Another poster is for a fictional movie production of Scanners Live in Vain by Cordwainer Smith, a story about men who have had neural alterations to survive space travel.
