= Water Witch (novel) =

1982 novel by Connie Willis and Cynthia Felice

- Cover of the Ace Books paperback edition
- Author: Connie Willis and Cynthia Felice
- Genre: Science fiction
- Publisher: Ace Books
- Publication date: January 1982
- Media type: Print (Paperback)
- ISBN: 978-0-441-87379-1
- OCLC: 8137602
- LC Class: CPB Box no. 2484 vol. 14

Water Witch is a 1982 science fiction novel by Connie Willis and Cynthia Felice.

== Plot introduction ==
On the desert planet of Mahali, political power is held by a hereditary line of water witches who can sense and control water. A young con artist girl named Deza tries to impersonate a water witch, helped by the spirit of her recently dead conman father, who now resides in a small animal called a mbuzi.

== Publication history ==
- 1982, USA, Ace Books ISBN 978-0-441-87379-1, Pub Date Jan 1982, Paperback
- 1999, USA GK Hall & Company ISBN 978-0-7838-8601-5, April 1999, Large Print Hardcover

== Reception ==
David Dunham reviewed Water Witch for Different Worlds magazine and stated that "I think the setting would be easier to use in a campaign than the storyline situation. Part of the action takes place in underground caves, no longer used for travel, but which still serve as water channels. In some places there are traps - areas where the floor suddenly drops away, but is covered with water. In other places there are sluice gates, controlled by the City's computers, which can either block off escape or release water into your tunnel."

== Reviews ==
- Review by Phyllis J. Day (1982) in Science Fiction & Fantasy Book Review, #4, May 1982
- Review by Debbie Notkin (1982) in Rigel Science Fiction, #5 Fall 1982
- Review by Thomas A. Easton [as by Tom Easton] (1982) in Analog Science Fiction/Science Fact, September 1982
- Review by Paul McGuire (1982) in Science Fiction Review, Winter 1982
