= Crosstalk (disambiguation) =

Crosstalk refers to any signal or circuit unintentionally affecting another signal or circuit.

Crosstalk may also refer to:

== Science and computing ==
- Crosstalk (biology)
- Crosstalk Mk.4, a communications application for PCs.

== Arts and entertainment ==
- Cross talk, a style of comedy used in performance by double acts
- Xiangsheng, also translated as "crosstalk", a traditional Chinese comedic monologue or dialogue
- Crosstalk (novel), a 2016 novel by American science fiction author Connie Willis
- Crosstalk (film), a 1982 science fiction thriller film
- Cross Talk, a 1980 album by the Pretty Things
- Crosstalk: American Speech Music, a compilation album by the produced by Mendi + Keith Obadike
- CrossTalk (TV series), a television program on the Russian-based international broadcaster RT
- Cross Talk, a defunct radio show hosted by Indian RJ Balaji
