= Remake (novel) =

1995 novel by Connie Willis

- Cover of first paperback edition (Bantam Books, 1995)
- Author: Connie Willis
- Language: English
- Genre: Science fiction novel
- Publisher: Mark V. Ziesing
- Publication date: 1995
- Publication place: United States
- Media type: Print (hardback & paperback)
- Pages: 240
- ISBN: 0-929480-48-1
- OCLC: 33948516
- Dewey Decimal: 813/.54 20
- LC Class: PS3573.I45652 R46 1994

Remake is a 1995 science fiction novel by Connie Willis. It was nominated for the Hugo Award for Best Novel in 1996.

The book displays a dystopic near future, when computer animation and sampling have reduced the movie industry to software manipulation. Constant litigation means that the rights to the digitized versions of movie stars like Gene Kelly can be removed or restored on an almost daily basis. Two movie editors deal with this while navigating their own relationship, using designer drugs that have unpredictable effects, and being pestered by a fan of classic dance musicals, who is mysteriously appearing in the movies they are editing.
