= Miracle and Other Christmas Stories =

Short story collection by Connie Willis

- Author: Connie Willis
- Publisher: Spectra Books
- Publication date: November 1999
- ISBN: 978-0-553-11111-8

Miracle and Other Christmas Stories, a short story collection by American author Connie Willis, is about the spirit and theme of Christmas. The stories in the collection are:

- Miracle
- Inn
- In Coppelius's Toyshop
- The Pony
- Adaptation
- Cat's Paw
- Newsletter
- Epiphany
- A Final Word (from Connie Willis)
- Twelve Terrific Things to Read... (Christmas stories)
- And Twelve to Watch (Christmas movies)

F&SF reviewer Charles de Lint praised the collection, noting "[its] believable characters, moving and/or amusing stories, and that wonderfully patented clean prose that is always the mark of Willis's writing."
