= Passage (Willis novel) =

2001 novel by Connie Willis

- Cover of first edition (hardcover)
- Author: Connie Willis
- Language: English
- Genre: Science fiction
- Publisher: Bantam Books
- Publication date: 2001
- Publication place: United States
- Media type: Print (hardback & paperback)
- Pages: 594
- Awards: Locus Award for Best Science Fiction Novel (2002)
- ISBN: 0-553-11124-8
- OCLC: 45558909
- Dewey Decimal: 813/.54 21
- LC Class: PS3573.I45652 P3 2001

Passage is a science fiction novel by Connie Willis, published in 2001. The novel won the Locus Award for Best Novel in 2002, was shortlisted for the Nebula Award in 2001, and received nominations for the Hugo, Campbell, and Clarke Awards in 2002.

Passage follows the efforts of Joanna Lander, a research psychologist, to understand the phenomenon of near-death experiences (or NDEs) by interviewing hospital patients after they are revived following clinical death. Her work with Dr. Richard Wright, a neurologist who has discovered a way to chemically induce an artificial NDE and conduct an "RIPT" brain scan during the experience, leads her to the discovery of the biological purpose of NDEs.

Willis includes elements of madcap comedy in the style and form of Passage, and links different events thematically in order to foreshadow later events.

In a review of the book, science fiction scholar Gary K. Wolfe writes, "Willis tries something truly astonishing: without resorting to supernaturalism on the one hand or clinical reportage on the other, without forgoing her central metaphor, she seeks to lift the veil on what actually happens inside a dying mind." Through Lander's work, Dr. Wright is able to develop a medicine that brings patients back from clinical death.

The novel contains discussions of various disasters, including the RMS Titanic, the Hartford circus fire, the Hindenburg disaster, the Eruption of Mount Vesuvius in 79, the 1883 eruption of Krakatoa, the Boston Molasses Disaster, and, almost as prominently as the Titanic, the sinking of the USS Yorktown. (Willis has written extensively in several novels about events in World War II.)

== Background ==
Connie Willis's inspiration for Passage came in part from her mother's death, when Willis was 12. Willis felt frustrated that relatives and friends tried to comfort her with platitudes, so she wanted to write a novel that dealt with death honestly and could help people understand the process of death and mourning.

The character of Maurice Mandrake was inspired by Willis's anger at psychics and mediums who take advantage of vulnerable people.

== Plot summary ==
Joanna Lander, a clinical psychologist, interviews patients who have had near-death experiences; she aspires to understand what occurs between the times when a person dies and then is revived. She becomes frustrated when many of her patients cannot or will not give accurate information about their experiences. She realizes that the scientific evidence is contaminated by the influence of Dr. Maurice Mandrake, a persistent and almost omnipresent charlatan "researcher" who publishes best-selling books about near-death experiences and convinces patients that their experiences happened exactly the way his books describe NDEs, such as learning cosmic secrets from angels:

They remembered it all for him, leaving their body and entering the tunnel and meeting Jesus, remembered the Light and the Life Review and the Meetings with Deceased Loved Ones. Conveniently forgetting the sights and sounds that didn't fit and conjuring up ones that did. And completely obliterating whatever had actually occurred.

Dr. Richard Wright, who has discovered a way to induce artificial NDEs in patients and monitor their brain activity throughout, contacts Joanna and asks if she will join his research study and interview his patients after he induces NDEs. She agrees. They are intellectually compatible and have a budding, mutual romantic interest.

Mandrake considers the pair his competitors, and he sabotages their efforts by approaching revived patients before they can. Mandrake's method is to ask mellifluous leading questions of the patients and thereby taint their self-reported NDEs; this causes Joanna and Richard hardship in finding un-interviewed volunteers for their own study. The reader later learns that two of their volunteers are liars, which also corrupts their conjectures.

Lacking enough volunteers for proper methodology, Joanna elects to undergo the process. She gets the help of Tish, a nurse, to help with the prep; Tish is happy to, because she thinks Richard Wright is "cute" and can flirt with him while Joanna is "under".

Joanna finds herself in a dark passage that, through further NDEs, she realizes is part of a dream-like version of the RMS Titanic, on which she encounters passengers of the real Titanic as well as someone symbolically near death, a high school teacher whom she had studied with a decade or so earlier, Mr. Pat Briarley. Between NDE sessions, Joanna struggles to figure out why she sees the Titanic, and she eventually tracks down Mr. Briarley, who spoke often of the Titanic in class. Joanna discovers that Mr. Briarley, once a highly animated and keen teacher, now has Alzheimer's disease. This is crushing to Joanna, who was certain that Mr. Briarley could give her "the key" to clarify why she sees the Titanic. However, Mr. Briarley's niece, Kit, promises to help.

Joanna also consults with Maisie Nellis, a nine-year-old girl who has a heart defect, "V-fib", because Maisie, a born rationalist, gives only accurate information about her NDEs. Maisie also gives Joanna important information about the Titanic.

Through talking with her patients and undergoing more NDEs, Lander realizes that the near-death experience is a mechanism that the brain uses to create a scenario symbolic of what the brain attempts to do when it is dying: find a suitable neural pathway by which to send a message that can "jump start" the rest of the body back into life. If the person having a real near-death experience can metaphorically send a message to someone appearing in the NDE, she learns (specifically, from a revived coma patient), the person will awaken and survive.

Before she can tell Richard Wright about her discovery, she goes to visit Nurse Vielle in the Emergency Room and is stabbed by a man deranged by a drug called "rogue". Before losing consciousness, she manages to say a few words to Vielle, trying to communicate her discovery about NDEs. She finds herself on the Titanic again and races against dream-like obstacles to escape and awaken.

Richard Wright, on hearing that Joanna is dying or dead, enters an artificial NDE, thinking that he will find himself in the Titanic and be able to rescue Lander. He instead finds himself at the offices of the White Star Line, where the names of the victims of the Titanic disaster are being read to the public - he is too late to "save" Joanna. He awakens many hours later, and Tish, crying, tells him that Joanna has died.

As Richard and Joanna's friends struggle with her death, Joanna herself remains on the Titanic until it sinks, and her memories of life fade away.

Richard realizes that Joanna was trying to tell him something before she died (they had discussed the importance of last words), and he tracks down all the people she spoke to before she was stabbed. He learns what Joanna discovered. Before she could reach him, Joanna had told, of all people, Mandrake, "The NDE is a message. It's an SOS. It's a call for help." Grasping her dying message, Richard develops a chemical treatment that he believes can revive a patient. Maisie suffers V-fib and dies, but Richard successfully uses his experimental treatment on her, and she later receives a heart transplant; she will live.

Within her final NDE, on an imaginary ship, Joanna finds herself adrift on the water, with some memories still intact and accompanied by a child and a dog which Maisie has told her about from other disasters. As the novel ends, they watch the approach of a ship repeatedly mentioned by Ed Wojakowski.

== Characters ==
- Joanna Lander - A clinical psychologist who attempts to learn the true nature of near-death experiences through interviews with patients. She is kind, often absent-minded, but as dogged as Sherlock Holmes when she is after a clue to her investigations. Joanna, who has no children of her own, loves Maisie Nellis, calling her "one of the world's great kids."
- Richard Wright - A neurologist who wants to discover a way to revive patients after clinical death. Described as blond and cute, he is considered aloof by Amelia Tanaka and by Nurse Tish, who want to date him, and a great catch by Vielle, who wants Joanna to date him. He is a nurturer: Joanna never thinks to bring lunch for herself, although an ongoing joke in the novel is that the hospital cafeteria is never open; Richard often feeds Joanna the oranges, crackers, candy bars and sodas in his coat pockets which he brought from home.
- Vielle Howard - A nurse who works in the ER, and Joanna Lander's best friend. They regularly get together to watch movies. Vielle has a crush on a police officer who looks like Denzel Washington; but she is pursued by a morgue employee.
- Maurice Mandrake - A charlatan researcher who interviews patients who have had NDEs, convincing them that their experiences were exactly as he describes in his best-selling books.
- Amelia Tanaka - A pre-med college student who volunteers for the NDE study because she thinks Richard Wright is cute. She reports that her NDEs make her feel warm and loved, but very late in the book it is revealed that she lied, having told Wright what she thought he wanted to hear. In fact, her NDEs took place in her college's department of chemistry and frightened her, to the point that she quits the project.
- Ed Wojakowski - A gregarious elderly man who volunteers for the NDE study and claims to be a World War II veteran in the United States Navy, but is discovered to borrow other people's experiences and possibly just to lie about all the rest. After many meandering and irrelevant stories, avoiding what he has actually experienced in an NDE, he tells Joanna after she nails him with a direct question that his NDE happened aboard a ship. She assumes it is the Titanic.
- Maisie Nellis - A nine-year-old suffering from cardiomyopathy and occasional ventricular fibrillation and atrial fibrillation; often in the hospital, she is put on the list for a heart transplant. She has NDEs and is a friend of Joanna. She is obsessed with famous disasters, including the Hartford circus fire (which becomes the setting of her final NDE). Maisie infects Joanna with her obsession, so that Lander's last NDE includes people who died in that fire. "Maisie, in fact, with her junior gonzo way of facing down death, owns the spiritual center of the novel," writes Gary Wolfe. (Jo Walton adds, "The chapter from Maisie's point of view after she has been lied to is one of the best things Willis has ever written...")
- Pat Briarley - Joanna's English teacher in high school who spoke often of the events surrounding the Titanic, which Joanna has internalized and largely forgotten; he has Alzheimer's disease.
- Kit Gardiner - Pat Briarley's niece, who has become her uncle's caregiver, and who becomes good friends with Joanna, offering to do research for her among Mr. Briarley's many books.
- Carl Aspinall - A coma patient in the hospital (whom the nurses and Joanna irreverently call "Coma Carl"). Like a dreamer in rapid eye movement sleep, he sometimes talks and gestures; his caretakers mistakenly interpret his movements as "rowing" and his utterances as "patches" and "oh, grand." When he suddenly awakens, Joanna learns that he was experiencing a sort of NDE set in Arizona, in which he was menaced by Apaches, was muttering about the Rio Grande river, and was attempting to send smoke signals, not rowing. Though a minor character, he actuates the novel's climax by unintentionally enlightening Joanna that the NDE is a process of sending a message, both physiologically and symbolically.

== References to pop culture ==
When they gather to watch movies one night, Vielle tells Richard, "As if talking to patients about their NDEs isn't bad enough, in her spare time Joanna researches famous people's last words." So does Willis: each chapter section and each chapter has an epigraph; they include:

- "More light!" (Johann Wolfgang von Goethe's last words)
- "To die would be an awfully big adventure." (Charles Frohman, quoting J. M. Barrie's Peter Pan before he died on the sinking RMS Lusitania in 1915)
- "I must go in, the fog is rising." (Emily Dickinson's last words)
- "Hold tight!" (Karl Wallenda's last words)

Willis has the characters discuss a great many movies, some of which have indirect or obvious bearing on the novel's themes. They include Coma, Fight Club, Final Destination, Flatliners, Harold and Maude, and Peter Pan, as well as The Twilight Zone and The X-Files.

Joanna frequently talks about the Titanic movie; she, Vielle, Pat and Kit Briarley, and others share her dislike of it because of the changes to historical fact. Joanna (speaking for Willis), complains:

about Lightoller and Murdoch. And Loraine Allison, she thought. She remembered ranting, "Why didn't they tell the stories of the real people who died on the Titanic, like John Jacob Astor and Lorraine Allison?... She was six years old and the only first class child to die, and her story's a lot more interesting than dopey Jack and Rose's!"

== Reception ==
Gary K. Wolfe, the first of many Locus reviewers to discuss the book at time of publication, compares the novel at many points with Willis's Lincoln's Dreams and writes:

Apart from its simple virtues as a compelling story on an irresistible theme, Connie Willis's big, ambitious new novel Passage should be of particular interest to her readers because of the ways in which it recapitulates major preoccupations and techniques of her career to date, and because in it she seems fiercely determined to show us everything she's got... Each makes historical research a major vector of narrative suspense, with specific historical details—the Civil War in Lincoln's Dreams, the sinking of the Titanic here—treated as though they were clues in a murder mystery.

Wolfe continues:

Like Doomsday Book (1992), it grapples with one of the grandest of all themes, death, and uses the inability of major characters to communicate key bits of information to each other as another suspense device. Like Willis's comic short fiction, it pokes fun at institutional culture—in this case hospitals, with their mazelike architecture and ego-driven politics—and at such ghoulish aspects of pop culture as afterlife gurus like John Edwards" (i.e., John Edward) "and self-help manuals for the recently bereaved."

Faren Miller wrote in Locus:

While the subject matter and setting of Passage allow Willis to display her characteristically unsentimental poignancy ... she can also poke fun at matters of life and death... The book's multiplying internal and external mazes provide an emblem of human complexity, foolishness, and deeper terrors, some reaching from beyond death.

Jonathan Strahan of Locus praises the novel's "seriousness", "clear-eyed humor" and its "amusing portrayal of what it's like to be in a big hospital", which is itself a "confusing, overwhelming portrait," as parts of what it makes "her most ambitious novel". He adds, "At the three-quarter point of Passage, Willis does something that no reviewer should leak but it is much of what makes the book worth reading. What she attempts is to find a way to look at death and life after death in a way that doesn't conflict with matters of faith, but which also is consistent with the fundamentally rational underpinnings of science fiction."

SciFi.com describes Passage as "an emotionally exhausting trip" that is ultimately "a rewarding experience." Laura Miller, writing for Salon, says that "its construction is a marvel of ingenuity and — what's even more remarkable, given the wizardry of Willis' storytelling — its intellectual honesty is impeccable... You won't find the beautiful sentences of more-celebrated 'novelists of ideas' here, though the ideas themselves are far better, more daring and more original, than those chewed over by most literary heavyweights. The dialogue can sound a trifle canned, the minor characters feel a mite thin (not that many novels of ideas don't share these flaws, too), which explains in part why Passage seems to hover between genre and genius. Given how rare a searching intelligence like Willis' is among today's novelists, does it really matter?"

The SF Site review judges that the novel "starts slowly, and it's too long. Willis' trademark habit of making some set of frustrating everyday-life details a recurring motif or running joke (in this case, the difficulty of navigating the hospital corridors, plus the never-open cafeteria) is over-extended here..."; conversely, reviewer Steven Wu felt that "Part One of the book is masterful, with several chilling scenes, a compelling mystery, and a doozy of a cliffhanger ending. But then, only a third of the way through the book, things begin slowing down."

The A.V. Club's reviewer writes:

There's certainly nothing comforting about Passage, which steeps its characters in death of all kinds — swift and sudden, prolonged and painful. Willis' satirical flair originally has Landry [sic] and Wright running around like The Three Stooges, juggling impossible schedules in an impossible environment and careening amidst exaggeratedly colorful characters in every chapter. A mid-book twist, however, takes the story into darker and more memorable territory, helping turn Passage into a complex, finely crafted, haunting story that makes the light at the end of the tunnel impossible to take lightly.

A reviewer from Scientific Gems wrote of the novel, "it is well-written, it has an interesting plot, and it has useful things to say about the nature of science and the nature of medicine. One piece of good advice, for example: 'Joanna says you should only say what you saw, not what anybody else says you should see.'" [Spoken by Maisie Nellis] "Indeed, the importance of truth is underscored repeatedly in the book. Thanks partly to a very young female patient with a strange taste in literature [Maisie again], there is also some interesting discussion of historical disasters..."
