= A Letter from the Clearys =

- Short story by Connie Willis
- Country: United States
- Language: English
- Genre(s): Science fiction

Publication
- Published in: Isaac Asimov's Science Fiction Magazine
- Publication type: Magazine
- Publisher: Dell
- Publication date: July 1982

"A Letter from the Clearys" is a science fiction short story by American writer Connie Willis, originally published in the July 1982 issue of the Isaac Asimov's Science Fiction Magazine, and later reprinted in the short story collections Fire Watch (1984) and The Best of Connie Willis (2013). In 1983 it won the Nebula Award for best science fiction short story published in the two years prior to 1983.

== Plot summary ==
"A Letter from the Clearys" starts with Lynn, a young teenage girl, and her dog making their way home through the countryside after a visit to the town's post office.

The narrator is living with her parents, older brother and a neighbour. She feels somewhat neglected as her family are very busy building a greenhouse. In addition, while calling her dog she contrasts him with her previous dog. When Lynn arrives home she reveals that she has found a letter from their friends, the Clearys. This family was due to have visited them 'before' but never came and they had always wondered why, wondering if a letter had been delivered to another family's postbox. The family is somewhat reluctant to hear the letter read but Lynn reads it out anyway.

As Mrs. Cleary asks for news about the family, the letter reveals that the older brother had been married and had a child, and also that the Clearys would have to postpone their planned visit until the next month.

This ordinary cheerful letter upsets the family greatly and Lynn states that this is not her fault, she simply found the letter.

It is now revealed that the family are hiding from looters in the aftermath of a nuclear war, which happened two years earlier. The missing family members had been on a day trip to one of the many places totally destroyed in the war, while the remaining family members are desperately trying to survive a nuclear winter (hence the importance of the greenhouse) and any starving looters. After one such attack the father's fear of returning looters led to his shooting at his daughter and killing her previous dog.

As the story closes the father is boarding up the abandoned post office as they cannot bear the possibility of finding another long-lost letter and any further reminder of how much they have lost. Lynn now reveals to the reader that, far from accidentally stumbling across the letter, she had been searching for it ever since 'it' happened. The letter had indeed been placed in the wrong postbox.
