= Fire Watch (short story) =

1982 novelette by Connie Willis

"Fire Watch" is a science fiction novelette by American writer Connie Willis. The story, first published in Isaac Asimov's Science Fiction Magazine in February 1982, involves a time-traveling historian who goes back to the Blitz in London, to participate in the fire lookout at St Paul's Cathedral.

The story won both the Hugo Award for Best Novelette and the Nebula Award for Best Novelette.

== Plot ==
The narrator is a student historian from a future where historians use time travel to study history directly. He had prepared himself to visit Paul the Apostle in the first century but instead gets sent to St Paul's Cathedral in 1940. He develops a deep emotional attachment to the cathedral and is highly devoted to his role in defending it – especially due to his bitter knowledge that St. Paul's would survive the World War II bombings but would be obliterated in a terrorist attack nearer to the protagonist's own time.

== Relationships to other Willis works ==
"Fire Watch" (1982) was included in Willis's short story collections Fire Watch (1984) and The Best of Connie Willis: Award-Winning Stories (2013).

The idea of a time-traveling history department at University of Oxford, introduced in this novelette, was also used in her later novels Doomsday Book (1992), To Say Nothing of the Dog (1997), and Blackout/All Clear (2010), as was the character of Professor James Dunworthy.

Although Willis's writing of "Fire Watch" predates the production of Doomsday Book by about a decade, Kivrin Engle, the main character of Doomsday Book, also appears as a minor character in "Fire Watch". The novelette references Engle's experience with the Black Death while time-traveling in the 14th century.

== See also ==
- List of joint winners of the Hugo and Nebula awards
