= Lincoln's Dreams =

1987 novel by Connie Willis

- Book cover
- Author: Connie Willis
- Publisher: Bantam Books
- Publication date: April 1, 1987
- ISBN: 978-0-553-05197-1

Lincoln's Dreams is a 1987 novel by American author Connie Willis about a historical researcher studying the U.S. Civil War who meets a young woman who seems to be dreaming General Lee's dreams. The book is about parapsychology, metaphysical speculations, death, and love.

== Awards ==
Awards for Lincoln's Dream
Year	Award	Result	Ref.
1988	John W. Campbell Memorial Award	Winner	
1988	Locus Award for Best Fantasy Novel	Nominee	
1988	Mythopoeic Fantasy Award	Shortlist	
