= Even the Queen =

- Short story by Connie Willis
- Genre: science fiction

Publication
- Published in: Asimov's Science Fiction
- Publisher: Davis Publications
- Media type: Print (Magazine)
- Publication date: April 1992

"Even the Queen" is a science fiction short story by Connie Willis, exploring the long-term cultural effects of scientific control of menstruation. It was originally published in 1992 in Asimov's Science Fiction, and appears in Willis' short-story collection Impossible Things (1994) and The Best of Connie Willis (2013), as well as in the audio-book Even the Queen and Other Short Stories (1996).

== Synopsis ==
Three generations of women discuss the decision of one of their daughters to join the "Cyclists", a group of traditionalist women who have chosen to menstruate even though scientific breakthroughs (in particular, a substance called "ammenerol") have made this unnecessary. The title refers to the fact that "even the Queen" (of the United Kingdom) menstruated.

== Reception ==
"Even the Queen" won the 1993 Hugo Award for Best Short Story. It also won the 1993 Nebula Award for Best Short Story. Nalo Hopkinson called it "hilarious and contrary". Laura Quilter, conversely, felt that it was "more of a diatribe against" feminism, with its humor being largely "its rather mean-spirited depiction of various strains of feminism"; Quilter subsequently specified that although the story "had some truthfulness & consequently some honest humor", she found it to be "hugely over-rated".

The Village Voice considers it "light-hearted" and "a comedy of identity politics and mother-daughter relations", while Billboard, reviewing the audiobook, describes it as a "sly jab at both feminists and anti-feminists."
