= Cynthia Felice =

American science fiction writer

Cynthia Felice (born October 12, 1942 in Chicago, Illinois) is an American science fiction writer. She is best known for her complex, carefully plotted stories and expansive universes.

Her first novel, Godsfire, and her first short Story within a story, "David and Lindy", were published in 1978. She and Connie Willis have co-written three novels, that are often considered young adult fiction, according to Willis.

Cynthia Felice is also a writing workshop enthusiast, and is considered an expert in many aspects of science fiction world-building. She has been included in several panels discussing future status symbols, dystopian fashion and next generation weapons.

== Published books ==
- Godsfire (1978) Pocket Books ISBN 0-671-81472-9
- The Sunbound (1981) Dell Books ISBN 0-440-18373-1
- Eclipses (1983) Pocket Books ISBN 0-671-83224-7
- Downtime (1985) Bluejay Books/St. Martins Press ISBN 0-312-94115-3
- Double Nocturne (1986) Bluejay Books/St. Martins Press ISBN 0-312-94114-5
- The Khan's Persuasion (1991) Ace Books ISBN 0-441-42527-5
- Iceman (1991) Ace Books ISBN 0-441-18373-5

By Felice and Connie Willis

- Water Witch (1982) Ace Books ISBN 0-441-87379-0
- Light Raid (1989) Ace Books ISBN 0-441-48311-9
- Promised Land (1997) Ace Books ISBN 0-441-00405-9
