= Uncharted Territory (novella) =

1995 novella by Connie Willis

Uncharted Territory is a science fiction novella by Connie Willis. Published in 1994, it follows three humans sent to explore an alien world, accompanied by a native guide, in an "archly written satire... of political correctness."
