= Locus Award for Best Science Fiction Novel =

Literary award by Locus magazine

The Locus Award for Best Science Fiction Novel is one of the annual Locus Awards presented by the science fiction and fantasy magazine Locus. Awards presented in a given year are for works published in the previous calendar year. The award for Best Science Fiction Novel was first presented in 1980, and is among the awards still presented (as of 2026). Previously, there had simply been an award for Best Novel. A similar award for Best Fantasy Novel was introduced in 1978. The Locus Awards have been described as a prestigious prize in science fiction, fantasy and horror literature.

== Winners ==
Award winners
Year	Author	Work	Ref.
1980	John Varley	Titan	
1981	Joan D. Vinge	The Snow Queen	
1982	Julian May	The Many-Colored Land	
1983	Isaac Asimov	Foundation's Edge	
1984	David Brin	Startide Rising	
1985	Larry Niven	The Integral Trees	
1986	David Brin	The Postman	
1987	Orson Scott Card	Speaker for the Dead	
1988	David Brin	The Uplift War	
1989	C. J. Cherryh	Cyteen	
1990	Dan Simmons	Hyperion	
1991	Dan Simmons	The Fall of Hyperion	
1992	Lois McMaster Bujold	Barrayar	
1993	Connie Willis	Doomsday Book	
1994	Kim Stanley Robinson	Green Mars	
1995	Lois McMaster Bujold	Mirror Dance	
1996	Neal Stephenson	The Diamond Age	
1997	Kim Stanley Robinson	Blue Mars	
1998	Dan Simmons	The Rise of Endymion	
1999	Connie Willis	To Say Nothing of the Dog	
2000	Neal Stephenson	Cryptonomicon	
2001	Ursula K. Le Guin	The Telling	
2002	Connie Willis	Passage	
2003	Kim Stanley Robinson	The Years of Rice and Salt	
2004	Dan Simmons	Ilium	
2005	Neal Stephenson	The Baroque Cycle (i.e. Quicksilver; The Confusion; The System of the World)	
2006	Charles Stross	Accelerando	
2007	Vernor Vinge	Rainbows End	
2008	Michael Chabon	The Yiddish Policemen's Union	
2009	Neal Stephenson	Anathem	
2010	Cherie Priest	Boneshaker	
2011	Connie Willis	Blackout/All Clear	
2012	China Miéville	Embassytown	
2013	John Scalzi	Redshirts	
2014	James S. A. Corey	Abaddon's Gate	
2015	Ann Leckie	Ancillary Sword	
2016	Ann Leckie	Ancillary Mercy	
2017	Liu Cixin	Death's End	
2018	John Scalzi	The Collapsing Empire	
2019	Mary Robinette Kowal	The Calculating Stars	
2020	Charlie Jane Anders	The City in the Middle of the Night	
2021	Martha Wells	Network Effect	
2022	Arkady Martine	A Desolation Called Peace	
2023	John Scalzi	The Kaiju Preservation Society	
2024	Martha Wells	System Collapse	
2025	Alexander Boldizar	The Man Who Saw Seconds	
2026	Nnedi Okorafor	Death of the Author	

== See also ==
- Hugo Award
- Nebula Award
- BSFA Award
