= All Seated on the Ground =

- Short story by Connie Willis
- Language: English
- Genre(s): Science fiction

Publication
- Published in: Asimov's Science Fiction
- Publication type: Magazine
- Publication date: December 2007

All Seated on the Ground is a science fiction novella by American writer Connie Willis, originally published in the December 2007 issue of American magazine Asimov's Science Fiction and as a standalone volume from Subterranean Press. It won the 2008 Hugo Award for Best Novella.

== Plot summary ==
The story follows Meg, a newspaper columnist who has joined a commission studying aliens that have landed on the University of Denver campus. The aliens glare at everyone, and allow themselves to be led to various locations, but the commission has no idea how to communicate with them. Following an incident at a local mall during the Christmas shopping season, Meg and a school choir director team up to try to decipher the aliens' actions before they leave Earth.
