= To Say Nothing of the Dog =

1997 novel by Connie Willis

- Cover of first edition (hardcover)
- Author: Connie Willis
- Cover artist: Eric Dinyer
- Language: English
- Series: Oxford Time Travel, #2
- Genre: Science fiction Comedy
- Publisher: Bantam Spectra
- Publication date: 1997
- Publication place: United States
- Media type: Print (Paperback)
- Pages: 434
- Awards: Hugo Award for Best Novel (1999): Locus Award for Best Science Fiction Novel (1999)
- ISBN: 0-553-09995-7
- OCLC: 36954540
- Dewey Decimal: 813/.54 21
- LC Class: PS3573.I45652 T6 1997
- Preceded by: Doomsday Book
- Followed by: Blackout/All Clear

To Say Nothing of the Dog: or, How We Found the Bishop's Bird Stump at Last is a 1997 comic science fiction novel by Connie Willis. It uses the same setting, including time-traveling historians, which Willis explored in Fire Watch (1982), Doomsday Book (1992), and Blackout/All Clear (2010).

To Say Nothing of the Dog won both the Hugo and Locus Awards in 1999, and was nominated for the Nebula Award in 1998.

== Source of title ==
The book's title is inspired by the subtitle of an 1889 classic work, as explained by the author in the dedication: "To Robert A. Heinlein, who, in Have Space Suit—Will Travel, first introduced me to Jerome K. Jerome's Three Men in a Boat, To Say Nothing of the Dog."

== Plot ==
Ned Henry is a time traveler in 1940 studying Coventry Cathedral after the Coventry Blitz of World War II. He is specifically searching for the location of the "Bishop's bird stump" (a MacGuffin). The narrator shows confusion explained by "time-lag", the time-travel-induced form of jet lag. He returns, unsuccessful, to his time, 2057, at Oxford University.

The Bishop's bird stump is needed for a restoration of the cathedral funded by Lady Schrapnell, a wealthy American neo-aristocratic woman with a will of iron. She has conscripted most of Oxford's history department to rebuild the cathedral exactly as it was before it was destroyed. Before going on further trips Ned must recuperate from his time lag and is sent to the hospital. Lady Schrapnell, however, insists he goes back on another trip. Before he can be conscripted by Schrapnell, Professor Dunworthy (who is in charge of the time machine) decides to send him back to the Victorian Era, specifically 1888, for his rest.

Dunworthy has an ulterior motive in sending him to 1888, as another time traveler appears to have violated the laws of the continuum by bringing an object back from then to 2057. Theoretically, nothing may be brought through the time machine in either direction as it might cause time to unravel, and safeguards have been put in place in order to prevent significant objects from making the journey. The historians and scientists who invented the time machine believe the object may rip time itself apart if it isn't promptly returned.

Ned, who only knows 20th century history, and still suffering from time lag, is given a crash course on Victorian times while simultaneously being told his mission and destination. The combination of muddled lessons, imprecise instructions, and the jump to 1888 worsening the time lag leaves him confused about where he is supposed to be, who he should meet, where he should go, and no idea at all about the out-of-time object he is carrying.

Time travel has a self-correcting mechanism called slippage, moving time travelers either in time or place from their target in order to protect history. Ned arrives at the correct time, but unknown to him, he is not at the estate where another time traveler should meet him. Instead, he has slipped in destination to a railway station 30 miles away. He meets Terence St. Trewes, a besotted young Oxford undergraduate, mistaking him for his time travel contact. He agrees to share the cost of a hired boat for a trip on the River Thames from Oxford down to Muchings End, where Terence hopes to meet his love, Tocelyn "Tossie" Mering. Ned, Terence, Cyril the bulldog and Professor Peddick (an Oxford don) travel down the Thames navigating locks, beautiful scenery, crowds of languid boaters in no hurry to get anywhere, and the party of Jerome K. Jerome, a homage to the original novel from which To Say Nothing of the Dog draws its name and themes.

Fortunately, Ned's contact in Muchings End recognizes him when he arrives and identifies herself: she is a young woman named Verity Kindle, who is pretending to be Tossie's cousin. Lady Schrapnell sent Verity to read Tossie's diary because Tossie (an ancestor of Lady Schrapnell) had written about a life-changing event involving the bird stump at the first Coventry Cathedral (St Michael's Cathedral), an event which had caused her to elope with a mysterious "Mr. C" to America. It is only at this point that Ned learns the nature of the object he is to return is Tossie's pet cat, Princess Arjumand. Cats are extinct in 2057 due to a feline distemper pandemic.

Ned and Verity continually attempt to fix the time travel incongruity. They must know the histories of the characters around them, and their descendant's impact on future history, and also the mystery of Mr. C. Their interloping attempts to fix the known history of the people around them cause ripple effects forward and backward through history from Waterloo to World War II, and even to 2018 (when time travel was invented). After several adventures attempting to correct things themselves, both end up, mistakenly, in different eras attempting to get back to 2057. In their absence, time itself corrects their meddling. On their return to 1888, Mr. C has been identified, interrupted relationships between characters have occurred, and clues throughout their experience reveal the location of the Bishop's bird stump in 2057.

Finally, in 2057, just in time for the celebration of the cathedral reconstruction, the location of the Bishop's bird stump proves to the historians and scientists that, in certain scenarios, objects can be brought forward in time which heralds a renaissance in recovery of historically lost, destroyed, or extinct objects.

== Characters ==
- Ned Henry, 21st-century historian, assigned by Lady Schrapnell to search for the "bishop's bird stump" by all possible means. This includes attending every jumble sale held in Coventry in 1940.
- Verity Kindle, another historian, who specializes in 1930s detective fiction. She masquerades as Verity Brown, a distant niece of Colonel and Mrs. Mering, in order to find and read their daughter's diary. By virtue of a time slippage, she brings something back to 2057, beginning the whole cascade of events.
- Professor James Dunworthy, a historian who has been associated with the Time Travel program from the beginning. He also appears in the story "Fire Watch" and the novels Doomsday Book and Blackout/All Clear.
- Finch, Dunworthy's clever and efficient secretary. He eventually joins the other time travelers in 1888, masquerading as the butler at the estate of the Chattisbournes, who are neighbors of the Merings. He finds the role easy to play, as he excels at organization and service.
- Tocelyn "Tossie" Mering, a beautiful and intelligent "rose of England" who, through the influence of her parents, is flighty, spoiled, and ignorant. She is Lady Shrapnell's ancestor. It is her memoirs, and her account of having her life changed when she visited St. Michael's Church in Coventry, which later became Coventry Cathedral, which inspired Lady Shrapnell to begin the reconstruction. By the time Ned Henry arrives on the scene, she is involved with Oxford student Terence St. Trewes and it becomes important for Ned to keep them apart.
- Colonel and Mrs. Mering. The Colonel is retired from the Indian Army and now devotes his time to collecting exotic goldfish. Mrs. Mering is a hypochondriac and a fan of spiritualism. The novel credits her with inventing the "jumble sale", that is, a charity bazaar where people donate unwanted household items, instead of donating items they have made, such as cakes, scones, craft items, etc.
- Terence St. Trewes, a young Oxford undergraduate whom Ned meets when he first arrives in 1888. Despite his not having any money about him, Terence is in fact a minor aristocrat and will have a considerable income, making him perfect for Tossie in the eyes of her parents. However the Oxford historians learn that Terence is supposed to marry Maud Peddick, the niece of his tutor, and that their descendant has a role to play in the bombing of Berlin, which caused Hitler to order the bombing of British cities instead of military targets, altering the course of the war.
- Professor Peddick, an Oxford don, Terence's personal tutor, who accompanies Terence and Ned on their trip downriver. Professor Peddick is an authority on both exotic fish and military history – which instantly endears him to Colonel Mering, and secures the trio an invitation to stay in the Merings' house – and an outspoken defender of the Great Man Theory of history.
- Professor Overforce, another Oxford don, and Professor Peddick's rival for a prestigious chair. Professor Overforce does not appear in person, but is frequently mentioned as an advocate of the Social Darwinism view of history.
- Baine, the Merings' butler. It is revealed later that "Baine" is merely a nom de métier he was given when working for the Merings' neighbours. According to the book, employers routinely give their servants pseudonyms for various reasons. Mrs. Chattisborne calls all her maids by the same name so as not to have to learn new ones. Mrs. Mering believes it is more refined to have English rather than Irish servants. She also uses the name "Jane" to refer to a maid named "Colleen." Baine previously worked for the Irish peer Lord Dunsany (Note: Since the literary Lord Dunsany would have been only 10 years old in 1888, Baine was most likely employed by his grandfather, the 16th Baron Dunsany - see Baron of Dunsany § Barons of Dunsany (1439)) under his real name, but Mrs. Mering will not have it used in her house. Baine is like P. G. Wodehouse's Jeeves, in that he is very intelligent (much more so than his employers), well-read (he reads Thomas Paine while awaiting orders) and incredibly efficient, ministering to his employers' every need, and even anticipating them.
- T.J. Lewis, an undergraduate student in computer science. Since he is black, he cannot be sent back in time by Lady Schrapnell, which is fortunate because he is needed to run simulations in an attempt to discover how bad the disruption of the space-time continuum might be.
- Lady Schrapnell, a rich American with a will of iron and a voice that can overcome any opposition. She has married into the Shrapnell title and is obsessed with rebuilding Coventry Cathedral exactly as it was the day before it was destroyed, in honour of her ancestor Tocelyn Mering. Everything must be completely correct, as "God is in the details". This includes the "bishop's bird stump", which was thought to be completely indestructible yet disappeared the night of the air raid.
- Elizabeth Bittner, widow of the last Bishop of Coventry. Old and infirm in the 2050s, she was one of the pioneers of time travel in the early 21st century. She was also a great beauty who entranced men, including Dunworthy. Ned compares her to the fictional Zuleika Dobson for her effect on her fellow Oxonians.
- Princess Arjumand, Tossie's pet cat, named after Mumtaz Mahal, whose rescue from drowning almost destroys the space-time continuum. She plays a major role throughout the narrative.
- Cyril, Terence's pet bulldog, who also plays a major role throughout the narrative.
