= The Last of the Winnebagos =

- Short story by Connie Willis
- Country: United States
- Language: English
- Genre(s): Science fiction

Publication
- Published in: Isaac Asimov's Science Fiction Magazine
- Publication type: Magazine
- Publisher: Dell
- Publication date: July 1988

"The Last of the Winnebagos" is a short story written by American writer Connie Willis. It was first published in Asimov's Science Fiction Magazine in 1988, and reprinted in the short story collections Impossible Things (1994) and The Best of Connie Willis (2013).

== Plot synopsis ==
The story, set in Arizona, takes place in a dystopian future where a pandemic called newparvo (a virulent strain of canine parvovirus) has killed all the dogs. In the wake of this disaster the Humane Society, referred to somewhat ominously as "the Society", has been given enormous powers within the government. The story's main character, photojournalist David McCombe, is haunted because despite being a professional photographer, none of the dog portraits he had taken show the personality of the subjects, and of his own dog, Aberfan, he has no pictures at all.

== Awards ==
- 1989 Hugo Award for Best Novella
- Nebula Award for Best Novella in 1988
