= Bellwether (novel) =

1996 novel by Connie Willis

- Cover of first edition (paperback)
- Author: Connie Willis
- Language: English
- Genre: Novel
- Publisher: Bantam Books
- Publication date: 1996
- Publication place: United States
- Media type: Print (Paperback)
- Pages: 247 pp
- ISBN: 0-553-37562-8
- OCLC: 33078699
- Dewey Decimal: 813/.54 20
- LC Class: PS3573.I45652 B45 1996

Bellwether is a 1996 science fiction novel by Connie Willis. It was nominated for the Nebula Award for Best Novel and won the Locus Award for Best Novella in 1997.

== Plot introduction ==
The main character, Dr. Sandra Foster, studies fads in Boulder, Colorado. Her employer, Hi-Tek, wants to know how to predict fads, in order to take advantage of this knowledge and thus to possibly create one. While Dr. Foster is extensively researching and analysing fads, Hi-Tek itself is swept by management fads. In addition, the Management wants one of its employees to win the mysterious Niebnitz Research Grant (the fictitious award is very similar to the MacArthur Fellowship's Genius Grant). Meanwhile, the employees struggle with chaos created by a self-centered administrative assistant. Willis uses humor to come to an unsettling conclusion.

== Resolution ==
The scientists experiment with sheep, finding that their flocks are led by bellwethers, certain sheep which are "indistinguishable from the rest of the flock, only a little greedier, a little faster, a little hungrier." Analogously, fads are started by some persons among the crowd, who, even without realizing it, are a little ahead of the rest.

Willis also creates a subtle reworking of Robert Browning's Pippa Passes. Browning's work, which is explicitly mentioned in Willis's, tells the story of a cheerful girl named Pippa who in passing by folks in a village influences everyone to the good. In Willis's novel, the administrative assistant Flip likewise influences everyone, though not in a charming manner. Flip and Pippa are both diminutive names for Phillipa.
