= Connie Willis =

American science fiction writer

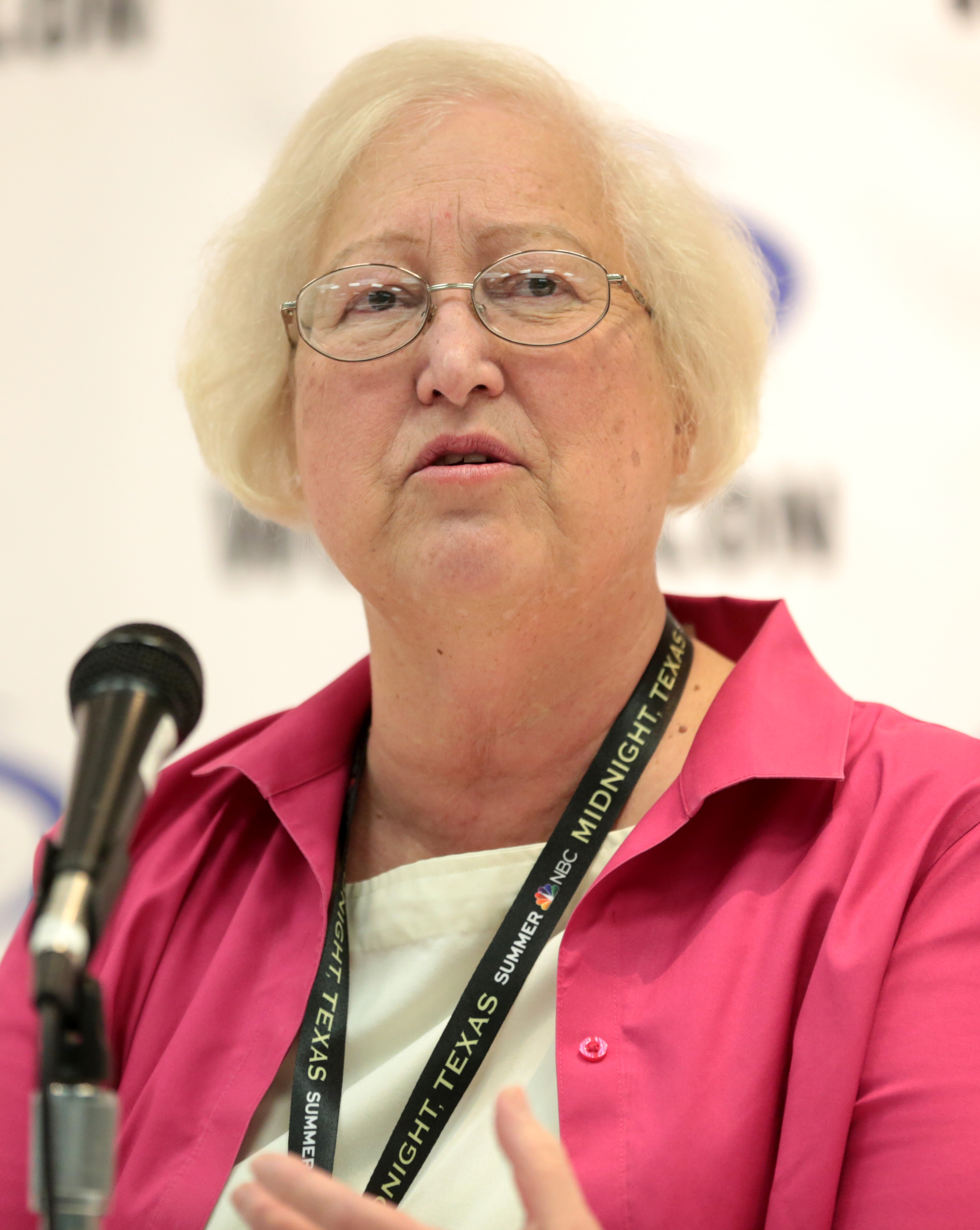
- Willis at WonderCon, 2017
- Born: Constance Elaine Trimmer; December 31, 1945 (age 80); Denver, Colorado, US
- Education: Colorado State College
- Occupation: Writer
- Spouse: Courtney Willis
- Children: Cordelia Willis
- Writing career
- Period: c. 1978–present
- Genres: Science fiction, social satire, comedy of manners, comic science fiction
- Subjects: Time travel; war, especially World War II; heroism; courtship; mores
- Notable works: Doomsday Book, To Say Nothing of the Dog, Blackout/All Clear, "The Last of the Winnebagos"
- Notable awards: Damon Knight Memorial Grand Master Award, Hugo Award, Nebula Award, Locus Award
- Movement: Savage Humanism
- Website: conniewillis.net

Constance Elaine Trimmer Willis (born December 31, 1945) is an American science fiction and fantasy writer. She has won more major genre awards than any other writer, including eleven Hugo Awards and seven Nebula Awards. Most recently, she won the "Best Novel" Hugo and Nebula Awards for Blackout/All Clear (2010). She was inducted by the Science Fiction Hall of Fame in 2009 and the Science Fiction Writers of America named her its 28th SFWA Grand Master in 2011.

Several of her works feature time travel by history students at the future University of Oxford, called the Time Travel series or the Oxford Time Travel Series. They are the short story "Fire Watch" (1982, also in several anthologies and the 1985 collection of the same name), the novels Doomsday Book and To Say Nothing of the Dog (1992 and 1997), and the two-part novel Blackout/All Clear (2010). All four won the annual Hugo Award, and Doomsday Book and Blackout/All Clear won both the Hugo and Nebula Awards, making her the first author to win Hugo awards for all books in a series.

== Personal life ==
Willis is a 1967 graduate of Colorado State College, now the University of Northern Colorado, where she completed degrees in English and Elementary Education. She lives in Greeley, Colorado, with her husband Courtney Willis, a former professor of physics at the University of Northern Colorado. They have one daughter, Cordelia.

In a 1996 interview, Willis said: "I sing soprano in a Congregationalist church choir. It is my belief that everything you need to know about the world can be learned in a church choir."

== Career ==
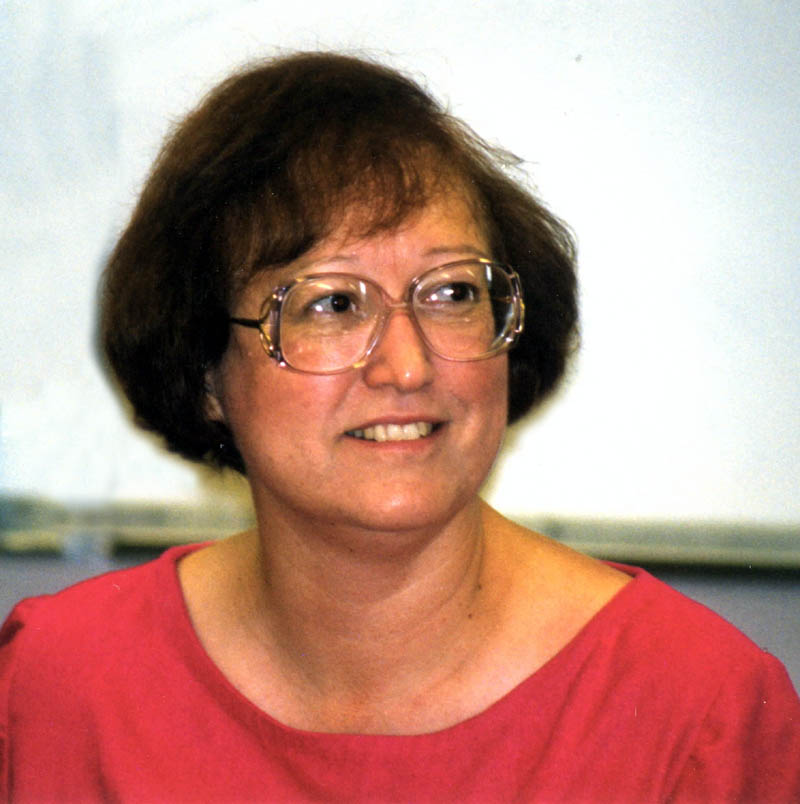
Willis at Clarion West, 1998

Willis's first published story was "The Secret of Santa Titicaca" in Worlds of Fantasy, Winter 1970 (December). At least seven stories followed (1978–81) before her debut novel, Water Witch by Willis and Cynthia Felice, published by Ace Books in 1982. After receiving a National Endowment for the Arts grant that year, she left her teaching job and became a full-time writer.

Scholar Gary K. Wolfe has written: "Willis, the erstwhile stand-up superstar of SF conventions—having her as your MC is like getting Billy Crystal back as host of the Oscars—and the author of some of the field's funniest stories, is a woman of considerably greater complexity and gravity than her personal popularity reflects, and for all her facility at screwball comedy knock-offs and snappy parody, she wants us to know that she's a writer of some gravity as well."

Willis is known for writing "romantic 'screwball' comedy in the manner of 1940s Hollywood movies."

Much of Willis's writing explores the social sciences. She often weaves technology into her stories in order to prompt readers to question what impact it has on the world. For instance, Lincoln's Dreams plumbs not just the psychology of dreams, but also their role as indicators of disease. The story portrays a young man's unrequited love for a young woman who might or might not be experiencing reincarnation or precognition, and whose outlook verges on suicidal. Similarly, Bellwether is almost exclusively concerned with human psychology.

=== 2006 Hugo Awards ceremony controversy ===
At the 2006 Hugo Awards ceremony, Willis presented writer Harlan Ellison with a special committee award. When the notoriously temperamental Ellison got to the podium, Willis asked him: "Are you going to be good?" When she asked the question a second time, Ellison put the microphone in his mouth, to the crowd's laughter. He then momentarily put his hand on her left breast. Ellison subsequently complained that Willis refused to acknowledge his apology.

== Awards ==
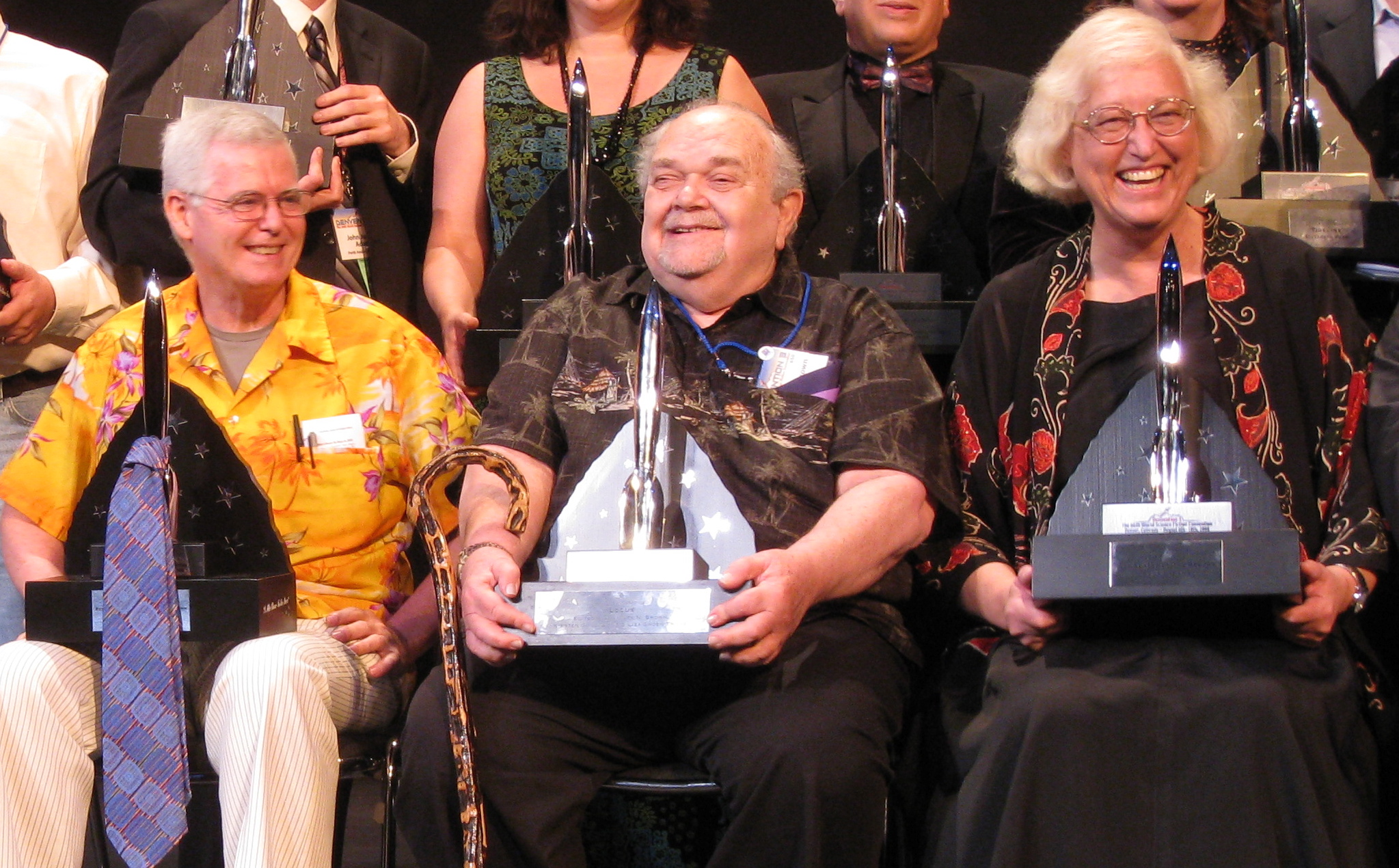
David Hartwell, Charles N. Brown, and Willis pose with the 2008 Hugo Awards.

W	Won	N	Nominated

=== Novels ===
Book / award	Hugo	Locus	Nebula	Ref.
Lincoln's Dreams (1987)	–	N	–	
Doomsday Book (1992)	W	W	W	
Remake (1995)	N	W	–	(Note: Remake was classified as a novel by the Hugos and as a novella by Locus.)
Bellwether (1996)	–	W	N	(Note: Bellwether was classified as a novel by the Nebulas and as a novella by Locus.)
To Say Nothing of the Dog (1998)	W	W	N	
Passage (2001)	N	W	N	
Blackout/All Clear (2011)	W	W	W	(Note: Blackout/All Clear was published in two volumes.)
The Road to Roswell (2023)	–	N	–	

Other awards:

- Lincoln's Dreams (1987) won the John W. Campbell Memorial Award.
- Doomsday Book (1992) was nominated for the Arthur C. Clarke Award and the BSFA Award.
- Passage (2001) received an Arthur C. Clarke Award nomination.

=== Novellas ===
Novella / award	Hugo	Locus	Nebula
"The Curse of Kings" (1985)	–	N	–
"Spice Pogrom" (1986)	N	N	–
"The Last of the Winnebagos" (1988)	W	N	W
"Time-Out" (1989)	N	N	–
"Jack" (1991)	N	N	N
"The Winds of Marble Arch" (1999)	W	N	–
"deck.halls@boughs/holly" (2001)	–	N	–
"Just Like the Ones We Used to Know" (2003)	N	N	N
"Inside Job" (2005)	W	N	–
"All Seated on the Ground" (2007)	W	N	–

"Chance" (1986) and "The Winds of Marble Arch" (1999) were nominated for the World Fantasy Award.

=== Novelettes ===
Novelette / award	Hugo	Locus	Nebula
"Fire Watch" (1982)	W	N	W
"The Sidon in the Mirror" (1983)	N	N	N
"Blued Moon" (1984)	N	N	–
"All My Darling Daughters" (1986)	–	N	–
"Chance" (1986) (Note: "Chance" (1986) was classified as a novella by the World Fantasy Award and as a novelette by the Locus.)	–	N	–
"Winter's Tale" (1987)	–	N	–
"Schwarzschild Radius" (1988) (Note: "Schwarzschild Radius" (1988) was classified as a short story by the Locus and as a novelette by the Nebulas.)	–	N	N
"At the Rialto" (1989)	N	N	W
"Miracle" (1991)	N	N	–
"Death on the Nile" (1993) (Note: "Death on the Nile" (1993) was classified as a short story by the Hugos and as a novelette by the Nebulas and Locus.)	W	N	N
"Inn" (1993)	–	N	–
"Adaptation" (1994)	–	N	–
"Nonstop to Portales" (1996)	–	N	–
"Newsletter" (1997)	–	W	–

=== Short stories ===
Short story / award	Hugo	Locus	Nebula
"Daisy, in the Sun" (1979)	N	N	–
"A Letter from the Clearys" (1982)	–	N	W
"Dilemma" (1989)	–	N	–
"Cibola" (1990)	N	N	–
"In the Late Cretaceous" (1991)	N	N	–
"Even the Queen" (1992)	W	W	W
"Close Encounter" (1993)	–	W	–
"The Soul Selects Her Own Society" (1996) (Note: Full title: The Soul Selects Her Own Society: Invasion and Repulsion: A Chronological Reinterpretation of Two of Emily Dickinson's Poems: A Wellsian Perspective title listing at the Internet Speculative Fiction Database.)	W	N	–

=== Lifetime achievement ===
Willis was presented with the Damon Knight Memorial Grand Master Award at the Nebula Awards banquet in May 2012. She has received a number of other awards, including an Inkpot Award at San Diego Comic-Con in 2008.

== Bibliography ==
=== Novels ===
==== Stand-alone ====
- Water Witch (1982) (with Cynthia Felice)
- Lincoln's Dreams (ISBN 978-0-553-27025-9, Bantam Spectra, 1987) – John W. Campbell Memorial Award winner, Locus Fantasy Award nominee, 1988
- Light Raid (1989) (with Cynthia Felice)
- Promised Land (1997) (with Cynthia Felice)
- Uncharted Territory (ISBN 978-0-553-56294-1, Bantam Spectra, 1994)
- Remake (1995) – Hugo Award nominee, 1996
- Bellwether (ISBN 978-0-553-56296-5, Bantam Spectra, 1996) – Nebula Award nominee, 1997
- Passage (ISBN 978-0-553-58051-8, Bantam Books, 2001) – Locus SF Award winner, Hugo and Clarke Awards nominee, 2002; Nebula Award nominee, 2001
- Crosstalk (ISBN 978-1-4732-0094-4, Gollancz, 2016)
- The Road to Roswell (2023)

==== Oxford time travel ====
- Doomsday Book (ISBN 05-535627-3-8, Bantam Spectra, 1992) – Nebula Award winner, BSFA Award nominee, 1992; Hugo and Locus SF Awards winner, Clarke Award nominee, 1993
- To Say Nothing of the Dog (ISBN 978-0-553-57538-5, Bantam Books, 1998) – Hugo and Locus SF Awards winner, 1999; Nebula Award nominee, 1998
- Blackout (ISBN 978-0-345-51983-2, Ballantine Books, 2010) – Hugo, Nebula, and Locus SF Awards, 2011 winner
- All Clear (ISBN 978-0-553-59288-7, Ballantine Books 2010) – Hugo, Nebula, and Locus SF Awards, 2011 winner

=== Novellas ===
- Inside Job (2005)
- D.A. (2007)
- All Seated on the Ground (2007)
- All About Emily (2011)
- I Met a Traveler in an Antique Land (2018)
- Jack (2020 as book, first published 1991)
- Take a Look at the Five and Ten (2020)

=== Short fiction collections ===
- Fire Watch (1984), whose title story won the 1982 Hugo and Nebula Awards
- Impossible Things (ISBN 978-0-553-56436-5, Bantam Spectra 1993) – contains three Nebula Award winners, two of which also won Hugo Awards
- Futures Imperfect (1996) – omnibus edition of Uncharted Territory, Remake and Bellwether.
- Even the Queen and Other Short Stories (1998) – sound recording of five stories read by Connie Willis including "Even the Queen", "Death on the Nile", and "At the Rialto"
- Willis, Connie (1999). Miracle and Other Christmas Stories. Bantam Spectra.
- The Winds of Marble Arch and Other Stories: A Connie Willis Compendium (2007)
- Time is the Fire: The Best of Connie Willis (2013), Hugo and Nebula award-winning short fiction, ISBN 978-0-575-13114-9
- A Lot Like Christmas: Stories (2017) – Omnibus edition combining Miracle and Other Christmas Stories, several additional short stories, and the novellas All About Emily and All Seated On The Ground.
- Terra Incognita (2018) – Collected edition of Uncharted Territory, Remake, and D.A..

=== Short fiction ===
- "The Secret of Santa Titicaca" (1970) – Published in Worlds of Fantasy
- "Samaritan" (1978) – Collected in Fire Watch and The Winds of Marble Arch and Other Stories
- "Capra Corn" (1978) – Collected in the "Limited/Lettered Editions" of The Winds of Marble Arch and Other Stories
- "Daisy, in the Sun" (1979) – Collected in Fire Watch and The Winds of Marble Arch and Other Stories
- "And Come from Miles Around" (1979) – Collected in Fire Watch
- "The Child Who Cries for the Moon" (1981) – Collected in A Spadeful of Spacetime
- "Distress Call" (1981) – Published separately by Roadkill Press and collected in two anthologies
- "A Letter from the Clearys" (1982) – Collected in Fire Watch and The Winds of Marble Arch and Other Stories and The Best of Connie Willis: Award-Winning Stories
- "Fire Watch" (1982) – Collected in Fire Watch and The Winds of Marble Arch and Other Stories and The Best of Connie Willis: Award-Winning Stories
- "Service For the Burial of the Dead" (1982) – Collected in Fire Watch and The Winds of Marble Arch and Other Stories
- "Lost and Found" (1982) – Collected in Fire Watch
- "The Father of the Bride" (1982) – Collected in Fire Watch
- "Mail Order Clone" (1982) – Collected in Fire Watch
- "And Also Much Cattle" (1982)
- "The Sidon in the Mirror" (1983) – Collected in Fire Watch
- "A Little Moonshine" (1983)
- "Blued Moon" (1984) – Collected in Fire Watch and The Winds of Marble Arch and Other Stories
- "Cash Crop" (1984) – Collected in The Winds of Marble Arch and Other Stories
- "Substitution Trick" (1985) – Collected in the "Limited/Lettered Editions" of The Winds of Marble Arch and Other Stories
- "The Curse of Kings" (1985) – Collected in The Winds of Marble Arch and Other Stories
- "All My Darling Daughters" (1985) – Collected in Fire Watch and The Winds of Marble Arch and Other Stories
- "And Who Would Pity a Swan?" (1985)
- "With Friends Like These" (1985)
- "Chance" (1986) – Collected in Impossible Things, The Winds of Marble Arch and Other Stories, and Gardner Dozois' Modern Classics of Science Fiction
- "Spice Pogrom" (1986) – Collected in Impossible Things
- "The Pony" (1986) – Collected in Miracle and Other Christmas Stories
- "Winter's Tale" (1987) – Collected in Impossible Things
- "Schwarzschild Radius" (1987) – Collected in Impossible Things
- "Circus Story" (1987)
- "Lord of Hosts" (1987)
- "Ado" (1988) – Collected in Impossible Things and The Winds of Marble Arch and Other Stories
- "The Last of the Winnebagos" (1988) – Collected in Impossible Things and The Winds of Marble Arch and Other Stories and The Best of Connie Willis: Award-Winning Stories
- "Dilemma" (1989)
- "Time Out" (1989) – Collected in Impossible Things
- "At the Rialto" (1989) – Collected in Impossible Things, The Winds of Marble Arch and Other Stories and Even the Queen and Other Short Stories and The Best of Connie Willis: Award-Winning Stories
- "Cibola" (1990)
- "Miracle" (1991) – Collected in Miracle and Other Christmas Stories
- "Jack" (1991) – Collected in Impossible Things and The Winds of Marble Arch and Other Stories
- "In the Late Cretaceous" (1991) – Collected in Impossible Things and The Winds of Marble Arch and Other Stories
- "Even the Queen" (1992) – Collected in Impossible Things, The Winds of Marble Arch and Other Stories and Even the Queen and Other Short Stories and The Best of Connie Willis: Award-Winning Stories
- "Inn" (1993) – Collected in Miracle and Other Christmas Stories and The Winds of Marble Arch and Other Stories
- "Close Encounter" (1993)
- "Death on the Nile" (1993) – Collected in Even the Queen and Other Short Stories and The Best of Connie Willis: Award-Winning Stories
- "A New Theory Explaining the Unpredictability of Forecasting the Weather" (1993)
- "Why the World Didn't End Last Tuesday" (1994)
- "Adaptation" (1994) – Collected in Miracle and Other Christmas Stories
- "The Soul Selects Her Own Society: Invasion and Repulsion: A Chronological Reinterpretation of Two of Emily Dickinson's Poems: A Wellsian Perspective" (1996) – Collected in The Winds of Marble Arch and Other Stories and The Best of Connie Willis: Award-Winning Stories
- "In Coppelius's Toyshop" (1996) – Collected in Miracle and Other Christmas Stories
- "Nonstop to Portales" (1996) – Collected in The Winds of Marble Arch and Other Stories
- "Newsletter" (1997) – Collected in Miracle and Other Christmas Stories and The Winds of Marble Arch and Other Stories
- "Cat's paw" (1999) – Collected in Miracle and Other Christmas Stories
- "Epiphany" (1999) – Collected in Miracle and Other Christmas Stories and The Winds of Marble Arch and Other Stories
- "The Winds of Marble Arch" (1999) – Collected in The Winds of Marble Arch and Other Stories and The Best of Connie Willis: Award-Winning Stories
- "deck.halls@boughs/holly" (2001)
- "Just Like the Ones We Used to Know" (2003) – Collected in The Winds of Marble Arch and Other Stories
- "New Hat" (2008)
- "Now Showing" (2014) – Collected in Rogues
- "I Met a Traveller in an Antique Land" (2017)

=== Nonfiction ===
- Roswell, Vegas, and Area 51: Travels with Courtney (2002)

=== Essays ===
- "On Ghost Stories" (1991)
- "Foreword" (1998)
- "Introduction" (1999)
- "The Nebula Award for Best Novel" (1999)
- "The 1997 Author Emeritus: Nelson Bond" (1999)
- "The Grand Master Award: Poul Anderson" (1999)
- "A Few Last Words to Put It All in Perspective" (1999)
- Bibliography, including a list of all of her SF short stories and "confessions" stories, collected in the "Limited/Lettered Editions" of The Winds of Marble Arch and Other Stories
- "A Final Word"; "Twelve Terrific Things to Read..." (Christmas stories); "And Twelve to Watch" (Christmas movies); all collected in Miracle and Other Christmas Stories

=== Anthologies ===
- The New Hugo Winners Volume III (1994)
- Nebula Awards 33 (1999)
- A Woman's Liberation (2001) (with Sheila Williams)
- American Christmas Stories (2021)
