= Blackout/All Clear =

Series by Connie Willis

- Blackout first edition hardcover
- Author: Connie Willis
- Language: English
- Series: Oxford Time Travel
- Genre: Science fiction
- Publisher: Spectra
- Publication date: February 2, 2010
- Publication place: United States
- Media type: Print (hardcover)
- Pages: Blackout – 512 pages All Clear – 656 pages
- Awards: Nebula Award for Best Novel; Locus Award for Best Science Fiction Novel; Hugo Award for Best Novel
- ISBN: 0-553-80319-0 (Blackout); ISBN 978-0-553-80767-7 (All Clear)

Blackout and All Clear are the two volumes that constitute a 2010 science fiction novel by American author Connie Willis. Blackout was published February 2, 2010 by Spectra. The second part, the conclusion All Clear, was released as a separate book on October 19, 2010. The volumes won the 2010 Nebula Award for Best Novel, the 2011 Locus Award for Best Science Fiction Novel, and the 2011 Hugo Award for Best Novel. These two volumes are the most recent of four books and a short story that Willis has written involving time travel from Oxford during the mid-21st century, all of which won multiple awards.

== Plot introduction ==
Willis imagines a near future (first introduced in her 1982 story "Fire Watch" and featured in two of her previous novels: Doomsday Book and To Say Nothing of the Dog) in which historians conduct field work by traveling into the past as observers. The research is mainly conducted at the University of Oxford in England in the mid-21st century. In their world, time-travel has been known since the early 21st century. The time-travel device, a portal called "the Net", remains in the time-traveler's present, while sending the time-traveler to a particular location (called "the drop") and time. They can return from the same location when someone in the future re-opens the Net for them at an agreed-upon "rendezvous" time.

Historians in Willis's world believe that the laws of physics resist possible alterations to the past by preventing time-travel to certain places or times. In some cases, the machine used for time-travel will refuse to function, rendering the trip impossible. In other cases, "slippage"—a shift from the exact, desired target in time and/or space—occurs. The time-traveler arrives at the nearest place and time suitable for preventing a time paradox; although sometimes this is only a few minutes later than planned, it can be as much as several years. An example is when the character Polly wishes to arrive on September 10, 1940, in London, but instead arrives on September 14.

In addition to slippage, which the technicians operating the net cannot control or predict, there are other reasons why a historian might not be able to travel to a certain time. Once a time-traveler has visited a certain date, he or she can never go to that same time again. The 21st-century authorities controlling time-travel also have rules and can deem some historical periods too dangerous for time-travel, even though those times might be theoretically accessible.

== Plot summary ==
=== Blackout ===
It is the year 2060, and the historians (time-traveling research staff) at Oxford University are a hair's breadth away from revolting. Mr. Dunworthy keeps changing their assignments at the last minute, for reasons not explained until All Clear. Michael Davies, who had prepared for a first-hand look at the events of Pearl Harbor, for example by having brain implants to give him an American accent and knowledge of that time, abruptly finds himself instead being sent to witness the response to the Battle of Dunkirk. The constant changes also mean that the wardrobe department cannot assemble the proper wardrobe for Polly Churchill, who plans to work as a shopgirl during the Blitz. Merope Ward, overseeing child refugees from London in Warwickshire, finds herself utterly unable to find the support she needs to complete her first assignment in the past. Dunworthy himself is nowhere to be found, having set off for a meeting with another academic, Ishiwaka, who theorizes that continued time travel has pushed the laws that safely govern it to the breaking point.

When they make it to World War II-era England, all initially seems well.

Merope takes on the persona of an Irish girl, Eileen O'Reilly, to secure a position in the staff of an English country manor house. From December, 1939, to May, 1940, she works for Lady Caroline as a servant; she desires to observe children evacuated from London during World War II. She sees far more of these children and their predicaments than she bargained for, especially some undisciplined trouble-makers, sister and brother street urchins Binnie and Alf Hodbin. Merope, referred to mostly in both books as Eileen, excels at her assignment, even when she comes to dislike it and to try desperately to escape to her "drop," which is located in the woods outside the manor grounds. The children love her, and when Alf comes down with measles, and then infects the dozens of other children, the house is quarantined; Eileen proves an excellent and tireless nurse, against her own wishes. She is appalled by what she considers the barbaric medical treatments of 1940 (she errs by referring to "a virus," a term not generally known then), and manages to save Binnie's life only by stealing some aspirin to bring the girl's fever down.

Eileen repeatedly finds herself unable to return to 2060 via her drop. She helps to return most of the children to their homes, and then plans to travel by train to seek help from her friend Polly, who should, by September, 1940, be a shopgirl in London. To her dismay, the local vicar, Mr. Goode, has arranged for Binnie and Alf to be given "safe passage" to Canada, so that they will not have to remain with their neglectful mother in Whitechapel, which, as Eileen knows, was bombed during the Blitz. But, as she also knows, they are likely to be transported on the SS City of Benares, which was torpedoed by a German submarine. Unable to allow this to happen, Eileen accompanies the brats to London, after which she can seek Polly. During their train trip, Alf's mischievousness delays their train; if the train had proceeded on time, it would have been destroyed by German bombers. When they disembark from the train and cross a field to find a bus, they witness in the sky the beginning of the Battle of Britain. Alf (who fancies himself a plane spotter) and Binnie are delighted to watch an air battle between a German Messerschmitt fighter plane against a Hawker Hurricane and a Spitfire. The Messerschmitt is destroyed, and Eileen manages both to return the children to their home and to find Polly.

Polly, fair-haired and pretty, secures employment at a department store in Oxford Street in the West End of London. Her intention (that is, her research assignment) was "to observe shelterers in the tube stations", but she ends up joining a group huddling under St. George's Church. The group, most of whom become fond of Polly, includes the nasty-tempered Mrs. Rickett, who owns a boarding house where Polly rents a tiny room; some other boarders, including the sweet but flighty spinster Miss Laburnum; Sir Godfrey, a Shakespearean actor who forms a crush on Polly; a rector; Mr. Simms and his dog Nelson; Lila and Viv, young women who chat constantly about dances and movie stars; and others.

Michael Davies had planned to travel to witness the attack on Pearl Harbor. Instead, he is sent to Dover, a trip he had intended to make later, where he had planned to witness heroism during the Dunkirk evacuation. When he discovers that, instead of Dover, he has landed in Saltram-on-Sea, a town 30 miles south, with his "drop" within some rocks on the beach, he tells the locals that he is Mike Davis, an American war correspondent, who wishes to cover the British anti-invasion preparations of World War II. The residents are pleased to find a "Yankee" interested in them.

To his horror, he is brought against his will onto the small, barely seaworthy craft Lady Jane of Commander Harold and taken across the English Channel to help evacuate the soldiers from the beach at Dunkirk. When they arrive at the mole there, soldiers begin scrambling onto the boat, but Michael must dive underwater to free the propeller from a corpse which has become entangled with it. Michael frees the boat and joins the evacuees on the deck, which is too crowded for movement, and the Commander guides the boat back to England. During the trip, Michael goes into shock and barely hears a rescued soldier, Private Hardy, thanking him for saving his life. When they return, Michael finds his right foot has been mangled. (He will limp for the rest of his life.) He awakes in Orpington War Emergency Hospital, where he is adored as a hero, but, for months, he is terrified that he has changed the course of history by saving soldiers.

Eventually, Merope, Polly and Michael meet each other in London. They are all worried because they cannot find drops which will return them to Oxford.

=== All Clear ===
All Clear begins where Blackout left off, with Michael Davies (posing as an American journalist, Mike Davis), Polly Churchill (as Polly Sebastian), and Merope Ward (posing as Eileen O'Reilly) trapped in 1940 Britain during the Blitz. Just as in Blackout, the novel switches between multiple people and times.

As the novel opens, Polly Churchill, who is posing as a shop assistant, realizes that she has a deadline. She had already visited Oxford and London in 1943. Since she was able to do that, and she now believes she is trapped in 1940, she must either have returned to the future or died by 1943. She is convinced that she will in fact die. We later learn that Mary, a seemingly unrelated character whose experiences as a volunteer nurse and ambulance driver in 1943-44 are included in All Clear, is actually also Polly, under an assumed name (Polly being a nickname for Mary). Meanwhile, Merope and Michael have found Polly after discovering that their drops are also unable to return them to the future. Now together, the three believe that their own actions, particularly in Mike's case, may have changed the future so that there is no time travel, and that possibly it will involve Germany winning the war.

Knowing something has gone wrong which prevents them from returning to 2060 Oxford, the three time travelers attempt to determine an escape plan, but none of their efforts are successful. A fellow student, Gerald Phipps, who was supposed to be at Bletchley Park studying Ultra, never came through to his assignment. They realize that another Oxford historian, John Bartholomew, is also in their place and time, but understand this only less than a day before he will leave. (Bartholomew's time travel experience is the subject of Willis's short story "Fire Watch," written almost thirty years previously.) Frantically they try to get to him, but the three are separated and repeatedly delayed, not helped by the fact that this is the night of December 29, 1940, during which some of the worst raids of the war occurred. They are unable to find Bartholomew before he returns to 2054 Oxford. When Mike and Eileen figure out that Polly has a deadline in June 1943, and its implications, their search for a way out becomes even more desperate. Their frustration turns into tragedy when Mike is reported killed during a raid. Eileen refuses to accept his death, but upon realizing Alf and Binnie's mother has been dead for months, she volunteers to raise the orphans, thus giving her life, now trapped in the mid-20th century, a significant meaning. Polly fights with her about this, but Eileen is adamant and later proves to have become a very good mother to the children.

In 2060, in Oxford, Mr. Dunworthy sends himself on a rescue mission to retrieve Polly in September 1940. However, when he arrives at St Paul's Cathedral, he is unable to determine the date before the raids start. (St. Paul's, and especially one of the paintings in the Cathedral, The Light of the World, are viewed several times by most of the important characters in the book. They are either inspired or depressed by their current view of the painting.) When he realizes it is December 1940, he becomes hopeless and distraught. Polly stumbles across him in the cathedral a few weeks later. He explains his hypothesis that slippage isn't a result of the time continuum trying to prevent historians from changing the past, as he had previously thought, but is a response to changes they'd already caused. The continuum around World War II is in such disarray that it has sealed itself off to time travel, and will engage in 'corrections' – likely the death of the historians and those they have influenced, Dunworthy believes. Their worst fears – that they have been able to influence the past and cause discrepancies – have been realized, possibly to the point the War will be lost.

However, all hope is not lost. Mike had faked his own death and in 1944 is engaged in Operation Fortitude, a misinformation campaign. Mike is not revealed to be this character until later in the novel, as he operates under a code name in this part of the narrative. He is able to plant notices in newspapers which hint where Polly and Eileen are located, in the hopes that someone in 2060's Oxford will find the notices and be able to rescue the young women. Another potential rescuer is Colin Templer, an overeager teenager from 2060 Oxford with a crush on Polly. He goes back to 1944 and finds Michael, right after Mike has been hit by a bomb and helped by Polly, who is then an ambulance driver and first-aid responder but who, because of the blacked-out night, cannot see that it is Michael. Mike explains to Colin that Polly and Eileen are together, then falls unconscious as Colin brings him back to 2060 Oxford. Colin also goes to the 1970s for research and to 1995 to try to find someone who knew Polly. To his surprise, in 1995 he meets an elderly Binnie, who tells him Eileen died in 1987. Binnie also reveals that she has learned all about time travel and has been looking for him through the decades to tell him where and when he can rescue the stranded historians. Equipped with this knowledge, Colin is able to return to 1941 to rescue Polly and Mr. Dunworthy.

Despite Polly's worries about leading to the deaths of those around her by interfering, she heroically risks her own life to save Sir Godfrey's during a bombing. She finally realizes what is going on as she lies recovering in the hospital; the historians have caused small things to happen which ultimately led to winning the war. She concludes that they're stuck in World War II not to be killed by the continuum, but because there are things they need to do so that the war will be won by the Allies and so that history is as it should be.

In April 1941, an older Colin comes through at St. Paul's and finds the historians. Polly and Mr. Dunworthy leave with Colin to return to 2060 Oxford, but Eileen stays behind. She reasons that she must remain in the past so she can tell Colin in the future where to find them, and she refuses to abandon Alf and Binnie. Colin tells them that Mike had faked his own death, but died in Oxford from his 1944 injuries. Finally Polly, Mr. Dunworthy, and Colin return to the St. Paul's drop and to Oxford. Eileen stays behind, committing to live out her life in the past with Alf and Binnie.

While waiting for the drop to open for her to return to Oxford, Polly also realizes that there is a resemblance between the grown-up Colin and Eileen, implying that Eileen will become his ancestor. Eileen also seemed to see this, since she called Colin "dear boy" and said "I will always be with you" before they left. Thus Eileen had another reason to remain behind in 1941.

On VE-Day, May 7, 1945, Eileen is reunited during the celebrations with Vicar Goode, whom she has known since the beginning of the War while working for Lady Caroline in Warwickshire. Vicar Goode had always been kind to Alf and Binnie, and it is strongly implied that Eileen and Mr. Goode will marry and raise the children together.

== Characters ==
- Polly Churchill is a 25-year-old Oxford student historian (in 2060), with previous time-traveling experience, who goes to London as Polly Sebastian to become a shopgirl, in September 1940, to observe Londoners' reactions to the Blitz. She is unable to return to 2060 through her "drop" in London, and comes to believe she has a "deadline" to return or die, due to a previous trip back to a later time during World War II (since a time traveler cannot exist in the same time more than once). Polly can be sneaky and deceitful; she often lies to her friends Merope and Michael, apparently for the self-serving reason that she doesn't want to see them feel hurt if she tells them the truth about their situation. In one of her previous time-traveling trips to WWII, she was known as Mary Kent, a FANY nurse, who unknowingly treated Ernest (Michael Davis) after an HE attack, and who also saw Eileen (Merope Ward) on VE-Day.
  Not wishing to use the last name Churchill during a trip to WWII, she tells Merope that she chooses aliases from the plays of William Shakespeare; in this case, that of Sebastian from Twelfth Night, a play often quoted throughout the novel.
  She is also given, by her FANY friends, nicknames based on motorcycle manufacturers, such as Douglas, DeHavilland, and Triumph.
- Michael Davies is another 2060 Oxford student historian. While pretending to be an American reporter, Mike Davis, he tries to reach Dover in May 1940 to observe soldiers being evacuated back to England from Dunkirk. Instead, Mike is transported to Saltram-on-Sea, and ends up on a boat which goes to Dunkirk, where he loses half his right foot while helping to evacuate soldiers. After spending several months in a hospital in Orpington (in Greater London) he discovers that he cannot return to the future via his "drop" in Saltram-on-Sea, and in September 1940 travels to London in seeking Polly and her drop. When Michael later works on Fortitude South, he goes by the codename Ernest Worthing. (Fortitude South operatives in the book are named after characters in The Importance of Being Earnest).
  Willis might have taken Davies's last name from that of Lieutenant Robert Davies (GC), who distinguished himself during the Second World War with the Royal Engineers and was awarded the George Cross (GC) for the heroism he displayed in defusing a bomb which threatened to destroy St Paul's Cathedral on 12 September 1940.
- Merope Ward is a red-headed young Oxford historian (in 2060) making her first trip back in time to Warwickshire as a servant, Eileen O'Reilly, in a country house in 1939 to observe children evacuated from London. Her name Ward suggests her sympathy for the orphaned wards of the war-time. After Merope cannot return to 2060 Oxford via her drop in Warwickshire, she travels to London to seek help from her friend Polly. Unable ever to find a viable drop, she chooses to remain in England and to adopt and raise Alf and Binnie Hodbin.
  It is implied at the end of All Clear that she will marry Vicar Goode and will become an ancestor of Colin Templer.
- Alf and Binnie Hodbin (Binnie is an 11-year-old girl; Alf is her younger brother) are very troublesome young urchins evacuated from London to Warwickshire in 1939. Despite causing difficulties for Eileen (Merope), she nurses them after both catch measles (and saves Binnie's life when her measles turns into pneumonia). After a measles quarantine is lifted, Eileen delivers them both back to their mother in London in September 1940. Binnie, it turns out, has never been given a first name; "Binnie" is merely a nickname derived from her last name, Hodbin. When she fears dying and having no given name on her tombstone, Eileen tells her she can choose any name she likes. Binnie searches film magazines for a glamorous actress name. At one point, she chooses "Spitfire"; later she opts for Dolores, Rapunzel, Vera, and others. Finally she takes Eileen's name as her own, too.
- James Dunworthy, a Fellow (professor) of History in charge of time travel from Oxford in 2060. (Dunworthy was a pivotal character in "Fire Watch", Doomsday Book and To Say Nothing of the Dog.) His students think that he is overprotective. When he comes to believe that he alone is responsible for altering the "real" historical facts, he succumbs to despair. Polly finds him in St Paul's Cathedral in All Clear; in every story in which Dunworthy occurs, it is emphasized that he cares chiefly for the Cathedral, for his students, and for the importance of history.
- Lady Caroline Denewell - lives at Denewell Manor in Warwickshire where Eileen first serves and where the Hodbin children are evacuated; later she becomes the Major, Polly/Mary Kent's commanding officer at the FANY station in Dulwich.
- Sir Godfrey Kingsman is an elderly Shakespearean actor encountered by Polly in London in September 1940. A mutual attraction between them develops (despite the large difference between their ages), beyond their shared love of Shakespeare. Sir Godfrey intuits more about Polly than what she tells him. In 1941, he is in the Phoenix Theatre when it is bombed, and Polly saves his life.
- Commander Harold, an elderly and very determined patriot, and his nephew Jonathan live in Saltram-on-Sea and, with Michael, take their motor launch, the Lady Jane, to Dunkirk to help in the evacuation, even though Harold was never commissioned into the Royal Navy and was forbidden to go. Late in All Clear, Michael learns that they did not die at Dunkirk, as he had been told, but have been working for British Intelligence. To his pride, Harold was finally commissioned as a Sea captain.
- Colin Templer is a 17-year-old Eton College student (in 2060) who wants to become a time-traveling historian even before he's eligible to attend Oxford, and who has a crush on Polly. (An unauthorized previous trip into the past by Colin, occurring in Doomsday Book, is mentioned at the beginning of Blackout.) Because she is several years older than he, he begs her, at the beginning of Blackout, to allow him to travel long enough in time that he will become her age and date her properly. Against his plans and her wishes, this happens, and it is implied that they end up in a romantic relationship.
- Vicar Goode is, as his name suggests, a good man. Serving as vicar to the town of Denewell in Warwickshire, his duties are chiefly to his parish, but he spends much of his time obeying the orders of Lady Caroline Denewell, such as teaching her servants to drive automobiles in case they are needed to drive ambulances. He also befriends Merope (whom he knows as Eileen) and is fonder of her than she realizes; he helps with the orphaned children at Denewell Manor, and is one of the few adults whom the orphans Alf and Binnie respect and obey. When he meets Eileen again at the end of the War, it is strongly implied that they will marry and raise the two orphans together.
- Hugh Tensing is a civilian whom Mike Davies encounters in the hospital in Orpington, and who tells Mike he broke five ribs and injured his back after "a typewriter fell on me." In 1944, Mike is told by Commander Harold's nephew Jonathan that Tensing had actually "been shot in the spine." Hugh is vague about where he works, but is very good at solving crossword puzzles quickly. (The ability to solve crossword puzzles quickly was, at that time, one of the recruitment tests used by the British government for cryptographers.) Tensing later recruits Mike to work at Operation Fortitude.
- Mrs. Rickett is a civilian landlady whom Polly meets in a shelter and rents a tiny room from. (Polly is paying for breakfast and dinner at the boarding house, along with boarders Miss Laburnum, Miss Wyvern, Mr. Dorming, and eventually Eileen). Mrs. Rickett is, unfortunately, one of the non-heroes of the British war survivors, being a price-gouger; she is notorious for her expensive rental rates and her foul cooking, which often consists of boiled tripe, thin soup, or worse. The boarders are outraged when they have saved up their ration points to have a roasted goose for Christmas in 1940, and Mrs. Rickett takes the goose away to visit a relative in her country and leaves them with only turnip soup instead. Mrs. Rickett and three of her boarders die in a Luftwaffe attack in spring of 1941.
- Alan Turing was a historical figure, the chief of Hut 8 at Bletchley Park. Willis portrays him as an absent-minded professor and reckless driver, who while riding a bicycle runs over Michael moments after Michael arrives at Bletchley Park.
- Gerald Phipps is a 2060 Oxford historian with a background in maths. When Mike and Polly realize the need to contact him, they find that Merope is the one who last spoke with him, and she admits that she did not listen closely; she finds him boring and unbearable; she is certain he is there at the same time as they are, going to a place with a name (she says) consisting of two words which begin "with a D, I think. Or a P. Or possibly a T." It turns out that he was supposed to be at Bletchley Park in the Government Code and Cypher School, working on the Ultra program, but because of Dunworthy's changes to the time travel program, he was never able to go.
- Badri Chaudhuri runs "the Net" (Oxford's time-travel installation) in 2060. (This was also Badri's role in Doomsday Book and To Say Nothing of the Dog.)

== Development ==
Connie Willis worked on the story for almost eight years, during which, she said during the Hugo Awards ceremony, she pushed "everyone's patience to the limit".

In August 2006 at the 64th World Science Fiction Convention, in a give-and-take with her audience, Willis described her novel-in-progress: "It's about World War II, and I have four historians... One of them is with the evacuating children in the North of England; one of them is doing the Blitz; one of them is doing the civilian evacuation from Dunkirk, of soldiers but by civilians; and one of them is doing the Intelligence War involved in the lead-up to D-Day, where they fooled Hitler into thinking we were attacking at Calais, instead of at Normandy. And their lives are hopelessly intertwined; but then they all get in trouble—you know my books—they all get in terrible trouble and can't get out of it. And are stuck in World War II, for God's sake! So: Not a safe place to be." (An audience member called, "Better than the Plague!") Willis laughed but replied, "Not necessarily better than the Plague! In slightly better survival chance because they have the advantage of some knowledge that the locals don't have, but then again, historical events are notoriously inaccurate, and just because you think you know where all the bombs fell, doesn't mean you do. So that will figure heavily in the book... I have a lot of stuff to tell you about the war... The Brits were absolutely wonderful... They were great and plucky and funny under pressure."

In a February 12, 2010 interview Connie Willis said:

What are Blackout and All Clear about? They're about Dunkirk and ration books and D-Day and V-1 rockets, about tube shelters and Bletchley Park and gas masks and stirrup pumps and Christmas pantomimes and cows and crossword puzzles and the deception campaign. And mostly the book's about all the people who "did their bit" to save the world from Hitler—Shakespearean actors and ambulance drivers and vicars and landladies and nurses and WRENs and RAF pilots and Winston Churchill and General Patton and Agatha Christie—heroes all.

== Critical reception ==
Michael Dirda of The Washington Post praised the diptych as "as vivid an evocation of England during World War II as anyone has ever written" and wrote that "Blackout is, by turns, witty, suspenseful, harrowing and occasionally comic to the point of slapstick." Adrienne Martini of Locus Online called the 1940s Britain that Willis created "richly textured". A. M. Dellamonica described the story as "an intricate puzzle" and "a celebration, too, of courage and heroism, of perseverance, of ordinary people doing small things to aid in great causes, of devotion, friendship, keeping one's word. It has funny characters and laugh out loud moments aplenty, but it is no wacky romp, this book, no To Say Nothing of the Dog. At the same time, I found it funnier and, strangely, cheerier than previous Willis novels with a comparable body count."

Julie Phillips of The Village Voice wrote, "Blackout/All Clear is neither tragedy nor comedy, but a mystery story with touches of grief and slapstick... None of the three historians manages to stand by and observe... The cast of characters is long, but Willis convinces you to care about almost all their fates — and to surprise you about their connection to each other. Willis's evocation of wartime London sometimes feels romanticized, and it has few moral or demographic complications... Nor is Willis's theme, the heroism of ordinary people, especially original. But by the time the three historians and Mr. Dunworthy have unraveled the mystery and arrived at the full-on, three-hanky finale, you'll no longer be a disinterested observer."

Some reviewers complained of the length of the books and their narrative modes. Christopher DeFilippis, writing for the SF Site, said he thought the books "can best be described by words like 'belabored' and 'exasperating.' That's because the single story told in Blackout and All Clear didn't have to encompass two novels. Had it not been marred by endlessly repetitive prose and character actions, the narrative could have fit neatly into a single volume... Unfortunately, the bulk of Blackout is taken up by Polly, Mike and Eileen's individual realizations that they're trapped in the past, with each caught in a state of seemingly perpetual denial about their circumstances. Instead of acknowledging the blatant truth of their predicament, they concoct endless mental scenarios as to why their gates won't open... Willis goes on for pages with her protagonists repeatedly ruminating about the same "what ifs" over and over (and over) again. It may be understandable in the beginning of the story as the characters adjust to the magnitude of their situation. But it soon becomes apparent that this is what constitutes drama in Willis's universe and it never stops... It's a shame that these negatives so overwhelm Blackout and All Clear, because despite them the books feature many terrific characters moving in extremely interesting historical situations."

Similarly, Adam Roberts of The Guardian wrote, "The result is a mildly interesting 200-page novel about the ordinary heroism of British civilians during the war, bloated to 800 pages via an egregiously handled time-travel conceit, eked out with great jellied quantities of historical research, endless meandering conversations, long passages disposed into that tiresome typographical convention by which characters' inmost thoughts are spelled out in italics, and a string of inconsequential chapter-end cliffhangers/immediate resolutions that got increasingly on my nerves as the book went on. There's little overall tension, and the time-travelling historians come over as both panicky and amateurish – an undesirable combination, one might think, where timelines are lying about ready to be mucked up." He added, though, "The aim is a commendable one. Despite walk-on parts by General Patton, Agatha Christie and Alan Turing, the bulk of the characters in All Clear are ordinary people getting on with their ordinary lives... And it can't be denied that the subject here, the heroism of ordinary people in testing times, is worthy and honourable."
