= Doomsday Book (novel) =

1992 novel by Connie Willis

- First edition hardcover
- Author: Connie Willis
- Language: English
- Genre: Science fiction
- Publisher: Bantam Spectra
- Publication date: 1992
- Publication place: United States
- Media type: Print (hardback & paperback)
- Pages: 592 pages (paperback)
- Awards: Hugo Award for Best Novel, Nebula Award for Best Novel, Locus Award for Best Science Fiction Novel (1993)
- ISBN: 0-553-08131-4 (Hardcover); 0-553-35167-2 (Paperback)
- OCLC: 24952289
- Dewey Decimal: 813/.54 20
- LC Class: PS3573.I45652 D66 1992

Doomsday Book is a 1992 science fiction novel by American author Connie Willis. The novel won both the Hugo and Nebula Awards, and was shortlisted for other awards. The title of the book refers to the Domesday Book of 1086. Kivrin Engle, the main character, says that her recording is "a record of life in the Middle Ages, which is what William the Conqueror's survey turned out to be".

The novel is the first in a series about Oxford time-traveling historians, which includes To Say Nothing of the Dog (1998) and Blackout/All Clear (2010).

== Plot introduction ==
Willis's mythos is a near future, first introduced in her story "Fire Watch" (1982), in which historians conduct field work by traveling into the past as observers. The research is conducted at the University of Oxford in mid-21st-century England.

In the book's fictional universe, history resists time travel that would alter the past by preventing visits to certain places or times. Typically the machine used for time travel will refuse to function, rendering the trip impossible. In other cases, "slippage", a shift in the exact time of arrival, occurs. The time-traveler arrives at the nearest place-and-time suitable for preventing a paradox; variance can be anything from 5 minutes to 5 years. Some periods theoretically accessible can also be deemed too dangerous for the historians by the authorities controlling time travel.

== Plot summary ==
Kivrin Engle, a young historian specializing in medieval history, asks her reluctant instructor, Professor James Dunworthy, and the authorities running the project to send her to Oxford in 1320 near Christmas. This period had previously been thought too dangerous, because it stretched the time travel net 300 years earlier than it had ever been used before.

Shortly after sending Kivrin to the 14th century, Badri Chaudhuri, the technician who set the time travel coordinates for the trip, collapses, an early victim of a deadly new influenza epidemic that disrupts the university and leads to the city being quarantined. Kivrin also falls ill as soon as she arrives in the past. She awakens after several days of fever and delirium at a nearby manor whose residents have nursed her. She loses track of the "drop point", the location where she arrived and must return at a prearranged time in order to get home.

The narrative switches between Kivrin in the 14th century and 21st-century Oxford during the influenza epidemic. Kivrin discovers many inconsistencies in what she knows about the time: the Middle English she learned is different from the local dialect, her maps are useless, her clothing is too fine, and she is far too clean. Kivrin fakes amnesia as she tries to find the drop point. She becomes semi-integrated into society, bonding with the children Agnes and Rosemund.

In 2054, Dunworthy tries to determine if Kivrin is safe as Oxford collapses into a panic. Dunworthy befriends Colin, the grand-nephew of his friend Mary Ahrens, a doctor. Fears grow that the virus causing the epidemic has been transmitted from the past via the time travel net. This causes the acting head of Balliol College Professor Gilchrist to order the net closed, effectively stranding Kivrin in the past.

Kivrin and Dunworthy realize that she has arrived in England in 1348, more than 20 years later than intended and during the Black Death pandemic. Though there was no slippage (the time shift between a traveler's intended and actual date of arrival, ensuring they cannot change history), it is discovered that Badri, delirious with illness, input the incorrect coordinates. Ahrens and Dunworthy discover Badri contracted the influenza virus from human remains at the archaeological dig, starting the epidemic at future Oxford.

In the 14th century, two weeks after Kivrin's arrival, a monk infected with the Black Death comes to the village. Within days, many residents of the village fall ill, and Kivrin, who is vaccinated and immune, attempts to help Father Roche treat them. Kivrin's arranged retrieval date passes with neither side able to make it. Despite every effort, Kivrin watches all the people she has come to know die from the plague with the exception of a servant named Maisry who flees. The last one is Father Roche, who dies believing that Kivrin is a saint sent by God.

Influenza overwhelms the medical staff of the 21st century. Dunworthy is stricken by the disease but survives, awaking after the new year when the worst of the epidemic has passed. Of those able to help Dunworthy, many have died, including Ahrens, who succumbed while treating the infected.

At last, Dunworthy recovers and arranges for Badri to send him back in time to rescue Kivrin. Dunworthy and Colin find her, the last person left alive in the town. The three return to 21st-century England shortly after New Year's Day. Colin is excited by the concept of time travel, saying he will go to the Crusades when he is old enough.
