= The John Varley Reader =

2004 short story collection by John Varley

- Author: John Varley
- Cover artist: Ralph Mercer and Ian McKinnell
- Language: English
- Series: Eight Worlds
- Genre: Science fiction
- Publisher: Ace Books
- Publication date: September 2004
- Publication place: United States
- Media type: Print (paperback)
- Pages: 532
- ISBN: 0-441-01195-0
- OCLC: 55105932

The John Varley Reader is a representative collection of 18 of the science fiction short stories by John Varley, first published in paperback in September 2004. It features 5 new stories. Each story is preceded by an autobiographical introduction; until this book Varley had avoided discussing himself, or his works, in print.

The book won the Locus Award for Best Collection in 2005.

It was republished in 2020 by Open Road Media.

== Contents ==
- Introduction
- "Picnic on Nearside", first published 1974
- "Overdrawn at the Memory Bank", first published 1979, adapted in movie in 1984 - Overdrawn at the Memory Bank
- "In the Hall of the Martian Kings", first published 1976
- "Gotta Sing, Gotta Dance", first published 1976
- "The Barbie Murders" - Locus award for best novellette 1979
- "The Phantom of Kansas", first published 1976
- "Beatnik Bayou", first published 1980, nominated for best novelette Nebula award 1980
- "Air Raid", first published in 1977
- "The Persistence of Vision" - Locus award for best novella 1979
- “PRESS ENTER[]" - Locus award for best novella, Hugo Award for Best Novella and Nebula Award for Best Novella 1985
- "The Pusher" - Locus award and Hugo award for best short story 1982
- "Tango Charlie and Foxtrot Romeo", 1992 Seiun Award for Foreign Short Story and 1991 Hayakawa’s SF Magazine Reader’s Award for Foreign Short Story
- "Options", first published in 1979
- "Just Another Perfect Day", first published in 1989, republished in lightspeed magazine in 2011, (review by Steven H Silver)
- "In Fading Suns and Dying Moons", first published in 2003
- "The Flying Dutchman", first published 1988
- "Good Intentions"
- "The Bellman"

== Back cover (2020 edition) ==
"A landmark collection from the master of science fiction whose short stories “are quite literally unforgettable” (William Gibson).

These eighteen stories from the acclaimed author of the Gaea Trilogy, The Ophiuchi Hotline, and many other important works span thirty years of his distinguished career. In these pages are Hugo, Nebula, Prix Tour-Apollo, and James Tiptree Jr. Award winners, including “The Persistence of Vision,” “PRESS ENTER [ ],” “The Pusher,” and “The Barbie Murders,” among other outstanding works of speculative short fiction. As a valuable bonus, each story includes an autobiographical introduction by the author."
