= Locus Award for Best Novella =

Literary award

The Locus Award for Best Novella is one of a number of Locus Awards given out each year by Locus magazine. Awards presented in a given year are for works published in the previous calendar year.

The first award in this category was presented in 1973.

== Winners ==
=== 1970s ===
Locus Award for Best Novella winners, 1973-1979
| Year | Novella | Author | Ref. |
|---|---|---|---|
| 1973 | The Gold at the Starbow's End | Frederik Pohl | |
| 1974 | The Death of Doctor Island | Gene Wolfe | |
| 1975 | Born with the Dead | Robert Silverberg | |
| 1976 | The Storms of Windhaven | Lisa Tuttle and George R. R. Martin | |
| 1977 | The Samurai and the Willows | Michael Bishop | |
| 1978 | Stardance | Spider Robinson and Jeanne Robinson | |
| 1979 | The Persistence of Vision | John Varley | |

=== 1980s ===
Locus Award for Best Novella winners, 1980-1989
| Year | Novella | Author | Ref. |
|---|---|---|---|
| 1980 | Enemy Mine | Barry B. Longyear | |
| 1981 | Nightflyers | George R. R. Martin | |
| 1982 | Blue Champagne | John Varley | |
| 1983 | Souls | Joanna Russ | |
| 1984 | Her Habiline Husband | Michael Bishop | |
| 1985 | PRESS ENTER | John Varley | |
| 1986 | The Only Neat Thing to Do | James Tiptree Jr. | |
| 1987 | R&R | Lucius Shepard | |
| 1988 | The Secret Sharer | Robert Silverberg | |
| 1989 | The Scalehunter's Beautiful Daughter | Lucius Shepard | |

=== 1990s ===
Locus Award for Best Novella winners, 1990-1999
| Year | Novella | Author | Ref. |
|---|---|---|---|
| 1990 | The Father of Stones | Lucius Shepard | |
| 1991 | A Short, Sharp Shock | Kim Stanley Robinson | |
| 1992 | The Gallery of His Dreams | Kristine Kathryn Rusch | |
| 1993 | Barnacle Bill the Spacer | Lucius Shepard | |
| 1994 | Mefisto in Onyx | Harlan Ellison | |
| 1995 | Forgiveness Day | Ursula K. Le Guin | |
| 1996 | Remake | Connie Willis | |
| 1997 | Bellwether | Connie Willis | |
| 1998 | Where Angels Fear to Tread | Allen Steele | |
| 1999 | Oceanic | Greg Egan | |

=== 2000s ===
Locus Award for Best Novella winners, 2000-2009
| Year | Novella | Author | Ref. |
|---|---|---|---|
| 2000 | Orphans of the Helix | Dan Simmons | |
| 2001 | Radiant Green Star | Lucius Shepard | |
| 2002 | The Finder | Ursula K. Le Guin | |
| 2003 | The Tain | China Miéville | |
| 2004 | The Cookie Monster | Vernor Vinge | |
| 2005 | Golden City Far | Gene Wolfe | |
| 2006 | Magic for Beginners | Kelly Link | |
| 2007 | Missile Gap | Charles Stross | |
| 2008 | After the Siege | Cory Doctorow | |
| 2009 | Pretty Monsters | Kelly Link | |

=== 2010s ===
Locus Award for Best Novella winners, 2010-2019
| Year | Novella | Author | Ref. |
|---|---|---|---|
| 2010 | The Women of Nell Gwynne's | Kage Baker | |
| 2011 | The Lifecycle of Software Objects | Ted Chiang | |
| 2012 | Silently and Very Fast | Catherynne M. Valente | |
| 2013 | After the Fall, Before the Fall, During the Fall | Nancy Kress | |
| 2014 | Six-Gun Snow White | Catherynne M. Valente | |
| 2015 | Yesterday’s Kin | Nancy Kress | |
| 2016 | Slow Bullets | Alastair Reynolds | |
| 2017 | Every Heart a Doorway | Seanan McGuire | |
| 2018 | All Systems Red | Martha Wells | |
| 2019 | Artificial Condition | Martha Wells | |

=== 2020s ===
Locus Award for Best Novella winners, 2020-2025
| Year | Novella | Author | Ref. |
|---|---|---|---|
| 2020 | This Is How You Lose the Time War | Max Gladstone and Amal El-Mohtar | |
| 2021 | Ring Shout | P. Djèlí Clark | |
| 2022 | Fugitive Telemetry | Martha Wells | |
| 2023 | A Prayer for the Crown-Shy | Becky Chambers | |
| 2024 | Thornhedge | T. Kingfisher | |
| 2025 | What Feasts at Night | T. Kingfisher | |
| 2026 | The River Has Roots | Amal El-Mohtar | |
