= Persistence of vision (disambiguation) =

Persistence of vision is the optical illusion that occurs when visual perception of an object does not cease for some time after the rays of light proceeding from it have ceased to enter the eye.

Persistence of Vision may also refer to:

- Persistence of Vision (Star Trek: Voyager), 8th episode of 2nd season of Star Trek: Voyager
- Persistence of Vision Raytracer, cross-platform freeware ray tracing program
- Persistence of Vision (film), a documentary film based on Richard Williams' experiences trying to make the animated film The Thief and the Cobbler
- The Persistence of Vision (collection), a science fiction collection by John Varley
  - The Persistence of Vision (novella), 1978 Hugo and Nebula-winning novella of the collection
