= Locus Award for Best Collection =

The Locus Award for Best Collection is one of the annual Locus Awards presented by the science fiction and fantasy magazine Locus. Awards presented in a given year are for works published in the previous calendar year. The award for Best Collection was originally presented as Best Reprint Anthology/Collection between 1972 and 1974, in conjunction with a Best Original Anthology award which evolved into the modern Best Anthology award.

== Winners ==
=== Best Reprint Anthology/Collection ===
Year	Nominated work	Author	Ref.
1972	World's Best Science Fiction: 1971	Donald A. Wollheim and Terry Carr	
1973	The Best Science Fiction of the Year	Terry Carr	
1974	The Best Science Fiction of the Year 2	Terry Carr	
1975	Before the Golden Age	Isaac Asimov	

=== Best Collection ===
With the 1975 awards the category was renamed Best Single Author Collection, becoming simply Best Collection in 1984.

Year	Nominated work	Author	Ref.
1975	The Best of Fritz Leiber	Fritz Leiber	
1976	The Wind's Twelve Quarters	Ursula K. Le Guin	
1977	A Song for Lya and Other Stories	George R. R. Martin	
1978	Category not awarded		
1979	The Persistence of Vision	John Varley	
1980	Convergent	Larry Niven	
1981	The Barbie Murders	John Varley	
1982	Sandkings	George R. R. Martin	
1983	The Compass Rose	Ursula K. Le Guin	
1984	Unicorn Variations	Roger Zelazny	
1985	The Ghost Light	Fritz Leiber	
1986	Skeleton Crew	Stephen King	
1987	Blue Champagne	John Varley	
1988	The Jaguar Hunter	Lucius Shepard	
1989	Angry Candy	Harlan Ellison	
1990	Patterns	Pat Cadigan	
1991	Maps in a Mirror: The Short Fiction of Orson Scott Card	Orson Scott Card	
1992	Night of the Cooters: More Neat Stories	Howard Waldrop	
1993	The Collected Stories of Robert Silverberg, Volume 1: Secret Sharers	Robert Silverberg	
1994	Impossible Things	Connie Willis	
1995	Otherness	David Brin	
1996	Four Ways to Forgiveness	Ursula K. Le Guin	
1997	None So Blind	Joe Haldeman	
1998	Slippage	Harlan Ellison	
1999	The Avram Davidson Treasury	Avram Davidson	
2000	The Martians	Kim Stanley Robinson	
2001	Tales of Old Earth	Michael Swanwick	
2002	Tales from Earthsea	Ursula K. Le Guin	
2003	Stories of Your Life and Others	Ted Chiang	
2004	Changing Planes	Ursula K. Le Guin	
2005	The John Varley Reader	John Varley	
2006	Magic for Beginners	Kelly Link	
2007	Fragile Things	Neil Gaiman	
2008	The Winds of Marble Arch and Other Stories	Connie Willis	
2009	Pump Six and Other Stories	Paolo Bacigalupi	
2010	The Best of Gene Wolfe (aka The Very Best of Gene Wolfe)"	Gene Wolfe	
2011	Selected Stories	Fritz Leiber	
2012	The Bible Repairman and Other Stories	Tim Powers	
2013	Shoggoths in Bloom	Elizabeth Bear	
2014	The Best of Connie Willis	Connie Willis	
2015	Last Plane to Heaven	Jay Lake	
2016	Trigger Warning: Short Fictions and Disturbances	Neil Gaiman	
2017	The Paper Menagerie and Other Stories	Ken Liu	
2018	The Hainish Novels and Stories	Ursula K. Le Guin	
2019	How Long 'til Black Future Month?	N. K. Jemisin	
2020	Exhalation	Ted Chiang	
2021	The Hidden Girl and Other Stories	Ken Liu	
2022	Even Greater Mistakes	Charlie Jane Anders	
2023	Boys, Beasts & Men	Sam J. Miller	
2024	White Cat, Black Dog	Kelly Link	
2025	Lake of Souls	Ann Leckie	
2026	Uncertain Sons and Other Stories	Thomas Ha	
