= The Persistence of Vision (collection) =

Collection of short stories by John Varley

- First edition
- Author: John Varley
- Cover artist: Jim Burns
- Language: English
- Genre: Science fiction
- Publisher: The Dial Press/James Wade
- Publication date: 1978
- Publication place: United States
- Media type: Print
- Pages: 316 pp
- ISBN: 0-8037-6866-4
- OCLC: 3844742
- Dewey Decimal: 813/.5/4
- LC Class: PZ4.V299 Pe PS3572.A724

The Persistence of Vision is a 1978 collection of science fiction stories by American writer John Varley.

The collection was also published in the United Kingdom under the title In the Hall of the Martian Kings.

== Contents ==
The collection includes nine stories:

- "The Phantom of Kansas", originally published in Galaxy, February 1976.
- "Air Raid", originally published in Isaac Asimov's Science Fiction Magazine, Spring 1977. Varley later expanded this into the novel Millennium, which was adapted as the film Millennium.
- "Retrograde Summer", originally published in The Magazine of Fantasy & Science Fiction, February 1975.
- "The Black Hole Passes", originally published in The Magazine of Fantasy & Science Fiction, June 1975.
- "In the Hall of the Martian Kings", originally published in The Magazine of Fantasy & Science Fiction, February 1977.
- "In the Bowl", originally published in The Magazine of Fantasy & Science Fiction, December 1975.
- "Gotta Sing, Gotta Dance", originally published in Galaxy, July 1976.
- "Overdrawn at the Memory Bank", originally published in Galaxy, May 1976. Adapted into a 1984 television movie.
- "The Persistence of Vision", originally published in The Magazine of Fantasy & Science Fiction, March 1978.

== Awards ==
The Persistence of Vision won the 1979 Locus Award for Best Single-Author Collection.

The title story won the 1978 Nebula Award, the 1979 Hugo Award, and the 1979 Locus Award in the novella category.
