= The Ophiuchi Hotline =

1977 science fiction novel by John Varley

- First edition (publ. Dial Press); Cover artist: Boris Vallejo
- Author: John Varley
- Language: English
- Publication date: 1977

The Ophiuchi Hotline is a 1977 science fiction novel by American writer John Varley. It was nominated for a Locus Award. Part of his Eight Worlds series, the novel opens in the year 2618.

== Plot summary ==
Prior to the beginning of the story, humanity has been expelled from Earth by powerful aliens known as "the Invaders", and scattered across eight planets and satellites of the Solar System, the so-called Eight Worlds. The Invaders originate from a gas giant planet, and have occupied Jupiter, forbidding human access to it. Human expansion to the Eight Worlds has been aided by a broadcast of information from outside the Solar System, named "The Ophiuchi hotline" after the constellation Ophiuchus from which it appears to originate. The information received from this includes extensive material on biological modification, and while sex changes and other modifications have become routine surgeries, experimentation with human DNA remains taboo and forbidden on penalty of death. Related to this, while technology has been developed to allow people to back-up their memories, this is only permitted for implantation within a cloned body in case of death. Due to resource scarcity, only one clone of a person is allowed to exist at any one time, and, similarly, reproduction is restricted to one child per person. An exception exists for those people who join the artificially-created symbionts that can live openly in the vacuum of space.

The protagonist, Lilo, has experimented with human DNA and, when discovered, is sentenced to death. However, the night before her execution, a powerful lunar politician named Tweed offers her the chance to escape her sentence by replacing her with a clone killed in her place. Lilo accepts and Tweed takes her into hiding.

Tweed is the leader of a movement that intends to expel the Invaders and recover Earth, and makes Lilo join this movement under the watch of Vaffa, a guard who has multiple illegal clones, both male and female. Lilo attempts to escape twice, but each time she is killed by Vaffa, and a clone is revived with her original memories.

The third clone of Lilo is sent to an outlying moon of Jupiter, Poseidon, within which Tweed pursues clandestine research performed by illegal clones. Lilo bonds with Cathay, the teacher of the colony's children, and they become lovers. She is given a null-field suit — a conforming forcefield with an air generator that protects her from the vacuum — and is tasked with researching how to kill creatures that live in Jupiter's atmosphere. She reveals to Cathay that, when she began her original experiments, she put a clone of herself and a backup of her memories in a secret base in Saturn's rings, to ensure her survival in the event that she was executed.

Tweed then acquires a micro black hole with the intention of passing it through Jupiter in an attack on the Invaders. Lilo and Cathay board the ship transporting the black hole and seize it. After a struggle, Lilo and a Vaffa clone fall towards Jupiter. Vaffa dies, but Lilo encounters an Invader and is taken to a future version of Earth almost devoid of humanity.

Tweed then awakens another version of Lilo and sends her with a clone of Vaffa to Pluto to research a new message coming from the Ophiuchi Hotline. This one has been translated as a payment demand for the information that humanity has received, but does not specify what form the payment is to take. Lilo and Vaffa find a second clone of Cathay, and the three of them are tasked to lease a ship from navigators dedicated to hunt for black holes, and go beyond the orbit of Pluto to analyze the message. They eventually hire Javelin, one of the most successful black hole hunters.

Once in space, Javelin reveals that the black hole hunters have discovered that the beam of the Hotline originates from a point only half a light-year away from the solar system, scrambled to seem to come from much farther, and she will take them to the source of the beam. However, since the trip will take 20 years Lilo, Vaffa and Cathay go in hibernation.

In the meantime, the first clone of Cathay uses the stolen ship to reach Lilo's base. There he meets Parameter/Solstice, a human-symbiont pair who also know the location of the base. They revive the clone and use the ship to attack Poseidon, taking it out of orbit and destroying its security systems. To do this they crash Lilo's base into a black hole held in a force field on the moon's surface. They carry out a plan to transform the asteroid into a ship to travel to Alpha Centauri, but reveal Tweed's dangerous activities to the Eight Worlds, forcing Tweed to go into hiding.

When Javelin's ship and its passengers reaches the source of the Hotline, they are greeted by seemingly-human extraterrestrials who have been expecting them. They explain that most races in the universe have experienced a similar history with the Invaders: they are expelled from their home planets by the Invaders; they attempt to recover their planets by force, much as Tweed has been doing; and in the ensuing conflict they are driven out of their solar systems entirely. The extraterrestrials have been broadcasting information via the Ophiuchi Hotline to give humanity the tools they need for survival, and the price they ask in exchange is to be allowed to live alongside and within the minds of humans, so that they can add humanity's experience and thoughts to their own pool of knowledge. They suggest that, if humanity does not comply, they will turn the symbionts into an army that will attack humanity on the Eight Worlds.

The clone of Lilo previously transported to Earth spends 25 years there. Because of her null-field suit which she can turn on at will, she is worshipped as a god by the surviving humans scratching out a living at a pre-industrial technological level. During a dive to hunt a whale, she encounters an Invader, somehow steals a silver cube from it and is instantaneously transported to the source of the Hotline. There she meets her clone, and they find that the memories and knowledge of all of their clones, including those killed by Tweed, are somehow mixed and shared between them.

Somewhat surprised by this turn of events, the extraterrestrials explain that the silver cube is a singularity that can be used for space propulsion by canceling inertia. They add that the Invaders only give such a "gift" to races when they're preparing to expel them entirely from their home planetary system. Confronted with this news, Javelin, Cathay, Vaffa and both clones of Lilo return to the solar systems to alert humanity.

As the novel concludes, the clone of Lilo traveling in the asteroid towards Alpha Centauri meditates on her shared memories, and realizes that when she arrives there her fellow clones, and most of humanity, will be already be there waiting for her, having used the singularity for faster travel.

== Characters ==
In the novel, characters can be cloned and change sex. Memories can be recorded and played back into a new clone, allowing a kind of immortality. It is illegal for more than one copy of a person to exist. Certain crimes, including illegal cloning, result in "permanent death" where all clones and personality recordings must be destroyed. Criminals are tossed into the gravity well of a black hole that supplies the Lunar society with energy.

- Lilo, an initially wealthy and successful bio-engineer. Sentenced to permanent death for experimenting with human DNA in foods such as "bananameat", she is cloned several times, killed in various ways, and plays a principal role in the novel.
- Boss Tweed, a human politician, leader of the "Free Earth" party. "He" assumes the appearance of the original Boss Tweed, with period clothes and a body that has rolls of fat, in contrast to the sculpted and perfected bodies of the people around him. Tweed runs a clandestine organization using illegal clones, who dare not betray him because they will be killed if discovered. The object of his organization is to reclaim Earth for humanity. He is ruthless with his captives, killing them if they escape or fail him, since he can revive another copy of them at will. When exposed he goes underground by casting off all clothes and the fake body fat, revealing a nondescript individual with no gender at all.
- Vaffa, an enforcer for Tweed. Many clones of Vaffa exist, in both male and female forms. Sometimes the females are referred to as "Hygeia". On the Jupiter moon, there are dozens of Vaffa's serving as guards for the kidnapped clones working there. One Vaffa, a female, is sent to Pluto with a Lilo to investigate the new Hotline message. Despite their almost psychotic devotion to Tweed, the Vaffa's can be persuaded to break free with enough indirect persuasion, as when Lilo on Pluto persuades Vaffa to let her go out into the beyond with Javelin. Lilo comes to believe that the original Vaffa was Tweed's child.
- Mari, a medical specialist. Body alterations are routine in the society, and can even be done with home kits. Mari does personality recordings, revivals, and tissue grafts that allow Lilo and other clones to pass through society without being detected by their DNA. Mari works with Tweed on Luna, and her clone works on Jupiter's moon Poseidon. She seems totally committed to Tweed. One of Lilo's early clones has to kill Mari during an escape attempt. They had become close friends. Mari is revived as a new clone, and then revives more clones of Lilo as Tweed's schemes develop.
- Cathay, a teacher. Cathay is in disgrace as a teacher after the events of another story, "Beatnik Bayou", making him a perfect target for Tweed. One Cathay is on Pluto, while another is on the Jupiter moon Poseidon, teaching children born there. Meeting Lilo on Pluto and on Poseidon sparks instant attraction between them in each case. The Lilo revived by Cathay with help from Parameter/Solstice spurns him at first.
- Javelin, a "hole hunter". Hole hunters are solitary individuals who pilot their ships out beyond the edge of the Solar System looking for micro black holes. Most space travelers use "peds", which are limbs ending in large hands, instead of legs. Javelin has gone to extreme lengths, reducing herself to one arm, a much-reduced torso, and a single ped, allowing her to move in confined spaces where her passengers cannot go.
- Parameter/Solstice, a symbiont pair living in Saturn's rings. Lilo entrusts them with the location of her emergency backup clone that she hid when she feared being arrested for illegal DNA experimentation.
- Iphis, a pilot. There are two clones of Iphis, and two ships set up to look identical. Tweed uses them in a complex deception that allows him to send people and cargo to Jupiter's moons, which would otherwise look suspicious, by having one ship reach Jupiter at the same time as the other leaves to go to the official destination.
- Vejay, a scientist on Poseidon. Vejay has a plan to use the black hole that powers the clandestine colony as a rocket to propel Poseidon itself away from Jupiter. However the plan means killing all the Vaffa's, which is impossible. Returning from Saturn with Lilo's backup clone, Cathay jump starts the process by sending Lilo's capsule into the black hole.
- The Hotline creators. Although apparently human, they cannot reproduce the necessary body language. Their mannerisms are disturbing to the visitors. One claims to be the product of a group mind millions of years old, and that in interstellar space cultures grow, fragment and absorb one another so that ideas like "species" become meaningless.

== Related stories ==
- "Equinoctial": Parameter pairs with the symbiont she calls Solstice after her first symbiont partner, "Equinox", is taken from her by other pairs as part of a religious war in the rings of Saturn. The pair recover Parameter's lost children and escape the war by moving out to another ring.
- "Beatnik Bayou": Cathay educates a young male called Argus by becoming a child of the same age. A confrontation with a pregnant mother in search of a teacher leads to the end of Argus's idyll in a replica of a Louisiana swamp, and to Cathay's disgrace with the Teachers Association, preventing him from teaching more children.
- "Goodbye Robinson Crusoe": As a temporary escape from the economic war between Pluto and the rest of the Eight Worlds, the chief economist of Pluto retreats into a manufactured amphibious body with the personality of a young boy, experiencing adventures in a replica of a tropical ocean on Pluto. When the economy unexpectedly gets worse, he has to be found and his personality restored.

== Locations ==
- Luna. Earth's Moon is one of the most populous of the Eight Worlds. Like most human colonies, it is a utopian society living in tunnels and artificial caverns, ruled by a benign artificial intelligence. It is the most conservative in terms of fashion. Reconstructions of Earth environments, known as "disneylands", allow the inhabitants to experience contact with weather, jungles, beaches, animals and plants. The novel uses extracts of "news" to indicate that there are wide variations between educated, semi-literate, and illiterate people in the society.
- Pluto. Luna's opposite, a wild frontier society where, at least in terms of body-modification, anything goes. Visitors find themselves surrounded by holograms advertising strange products. They have to buy suppressors to kill the ads. Because of the hours-long communication delay with the rest of the Solar System, Pluto is losing an economic war and undergoing hyperinflation.
- Poseidon. One of Jupiter's retrograde moons, probably a captured asteroid, orbiting at a distance of tens of millions of kilometers. The name "Poseidon" was commonly used at the time the novel was written. It is now known as Pasiphae.
- Saturn's rings. The two main rings are sparsely inhabited by human/symbiont pairs who need only sunlight and some trace elements to survive. Other Eight Worlds stories describe how the pairs trade works of art for their needs.
- Other locations mentioned include Saturn's moon Titan, and Mars.

== See also ==
- List of science fiction novels
- Transhumanism
