= Blue Champagne =

Blue Champagne may refer to:

- Blue Champagne (song), a 1941 single by Jimmy Dorsey and His Orchestra with Bob Eberly
- Blue Champagne (collection), a 1986 collection of science fiction stories by John Varley
- Blue Champagne (Welcome to Paradox), an episode of the TV series Welcome to Paradox
