= Eight Worlds =

Setting for science fiction novels and stories by John Varley

The Eight Worlds is the fictional setting of a series of science fiction novels and short stories by John Varley, in which the Solar System has been colonized by human refugees fleeing an alien invasion of the Earth. Earth and Jupiter are off-limits to humanity, but Earth's Moon and the other worlds and moons of the Solar System have all become heavily populated. There are also minor colonies set in the Oort cloud at the edge of the Solar System. Faster than light travel is not (as yet) possible, though it is mentioned that test-flights will begin soon at the end of The Golden Globe, and the species has not as yet managed to extend itself to other stars.

The series mostly deals with the ways in which technology and necessity shape morality and society. Instant sex changes are considered a matter of fashion, rather than gender identity, and many long-standing human sexual taboos no longer exist.

The Eight Worlds story "Overdrawn at the Memory Bank", published in 1976, was adapted into a TV movie in 1984 starring Raul Julia.

The stories were written at different times and are not always consistent with each other. In particular, the novels Steel Beach and The Golden Globe are explicitly stated as being inconsistent with the original history (see #Consistency, below). Varley has written that the Eight Worlds background should be regarded as a group of common characters and situations that appear in different stories rather than a single consistent setting. Several of the stories feature common characters, and these may be seen as linking together the whole series.

== Characters ==
=== Pre-Invasion ===
For many years the "Pre-invasion" stories weren't clearly in the Eight Worlds sequence, since while sharing thematic elements with the Eight Worlds universe they didn't share characters or locations. This uncertainty was put to rest in 2019 with the publication of Irontown Blues, which featured Chris Bach, the son of Anna Louise Bach, as its main character.

==== Anna Louise Bach ====
The first Anna Louise Bach detective story is the short story "Bagatelle" concerning a nuclear device planted in an underground lunar colony. At this time, Earth is still home to a technological civilization, albeit one which has to deal with nuclear terrorism. Bach is the Chief of Police in New Dresden, a Lunar colony evidently founded by Germans. Later stories such as "The Barbie Murders", and "Tango Charlie and Foxtrot Romeo" deal with Bach in the earlier stages of her career. The novelette "Blue Champagne" has Bach as a minor character, working as a lifeguard in "The Bubble", a giant globe of water held in zero-gravity conditions on a resort satellite for the enjoyment of rich tourists. At the end of that story she announces that she has been saving her money to return to Luna and enroll in the Police Academy. A major character in the same story is Megan Galloway, a "media star" who seduces, and later falls in love with, "Q.M." Cooper, a former champion swimmer on Earth and Anna's occasional lover. A feature of the Anna Louise stories is her taste for "beefcake", or very masculine, muscular men.

In notes contained within The John Varley Reader, the author explains that he created Anna Louise Bach for stories which were too grim for the relative Utopia of the Eight Worlds series. He never intended that her story link to the Eight Worlds chronology. In fact, even within the Anna Louise Bach stories there are inconsistencies, such as the appearance of the fabulous "Mozartplatz" in "Tango Charlie and Foxtrot Romeo", where a huge chasm on Luna is roofed over producing cubic miles of pressurized space featuring aerial communities, artificial rivers etc. The other stories portray Luna society as living in cramped tunnels, although "Bagatelle" does take place partially on a golf course in a large cavern.

==== Megan Galloway ====
Megan Galloway first appears in "Blue Champagne" and then in "Tango Charlie and Foxtrot Romeo", linking her with Anna Louise Bach in both. In "Blue Champagne" she is a "trans-sister", a quadraplegic who leads a celebrity lifestyle with the aid of a sophisticated device that enfolds her entire body in a net of golden alloy threads, which move her limbs for her. The device also records sights, sounds and emotions as she experiences them. These are then sold as virtual reality experiences, known as feelies, for an audience of vicarious thrill-seekers. The income is needed to support the huge expense of renting the device. Her magnum opus is "Love", the feeling of falling in love, which she experienced with Q.M. Cooper. The selling of that feelie creates a rift between her and Cooper, resulting in him retreating to a commune.

In Steel Beach, she is also mentioned as one of the "Gigastars" enshrined by the Flacks - a bizarre celebrity cult - who later regret this choice, when feelies go out of fashion. In "Tango Charlie" she has shed the device, undergone surgery to restore her nervous system, and uses her money and influence to help Anna Louise Bach with her stuttering career and her current case. She mysteriously disappears 100 years before the action of "Steel Beach".

=== Post-Invasion ===
The story "Options" explores the issue of easy sex changes from male to female and back. A married woman, Cleo, living in King City, undergoes a change to male despite her husband's objections. As "Leo" she finds out what it means to be a man in her society and even becomes her husband's best friend. She also learns that people are adopting new names that are historically neither male nor female. She eventually returns to female as "Nile". The names of characters in other Post-Invasion stories reflect this social change.

==== Fox ====
Fox is a Luna-based Environmentalist - someone who uses weather machines to create intricate storms and weather patterns as a form of art - who appears in "The Phantom of Kansas" and "Picnic on Nearside". She was born female, but her mother Carnival had her Changed at two years old and raised as a boy. As an adult, she returned to living as female.

In "Phantom", Fox is mysteriously murdered by an unknown man. Though she is able to return to life with the aid of a cloned body and backed-up memories, she is unable to remember anything between her last "recording" and her death. Eventually, she discovers that her killer is her own clone, illegally created as part of an intricate kidnapping plot. They discover their mutual affection and leave for Pluto, where the less restrictive laws can allow them to live peacefully.

A character of the same name also appears in Steel Beach, but it is unclear if this is meant to be the same character. (Note: "The Phantom of Kansas" and "Picnic on Nearside" are the only stories in which Fox's mother's name is given as 'Carnival'.)

==== Cathay ====
Cathay, a Teacher, appears in the short story "Beatnik Bayou" and The Ophiuchi Hotline. His job entails working exclusively with one child for an extended period of his or her early life. In "Beatnik Bayou" he actually regresses physically to the age of the child and grows up at the same rate, keeping his adult mentality, but an incident results in him being professionally disgraced. In The Ophiuchi Hotline he is cloned illegally by the character "Boss Tweed", so that two of him are major characters in that novel.

==== Parameter/Equinox/Solstice ====
Parameter is a woman who, after a life of debauchery fueled by inherited money, tries the only untried experience left, that of half of a symbiotic pair living among the rings of Saturn, as described in the story "Equinoctial". Her first pairing ends when she is captured by religious fanatics who kidnap her newborn children to raise in their religion. Her symb partner, who took the name "Equinox", is killed, which almost drives Parameter insane. Offered another partner, she reluctantly accepts. The new symb takes the name "Solstice". The two are eventually reunited with her children. In The Ophiuchi Hotline she helps Lilo hide a cloned body in a capsule orbiting Saturn.

==== Hildy Johnson ====
A journalist who was born Maria Cabrini, then used the name Mario after her first Change, but eventually took a new name from The Front Page. Hildy is the central character in Steel Beach and has appeared as a minor character in other works.

==== Sparky Valentine ====
Actor and con-man. The main character of The Golden Globe.

=== Groups and organizations ===
==== The Invaders ====
Described at length in The Ophiuchi Hotline, the Invaders are inhabitants of gas-giant planets like Jupiter. They transcend the limits of four-dimensional spacetime and can manipulate time and space at will. They classify living beings in one of three categories: those such as themselves, who arise in gas giant planets everywhere, cetaceans such as dolphins and whales, and vermin, the last category including all sentient beings other than Invaders and cetaceans.

The Invasion of Earth was carried out to protect cetaceans from the effects of human civilization. Although no humans were directly killed, billions died as the Invaders dismantled all the infrastructure needed to support human civilization on Earth. The human population remaining on Earth after the Invasion is about the same as in prehistory, living in tribes without access to technology. The Invaders have been repeating these actions with different races across the galaxy for millions of years. The vermin inevitably attempt to regain control of their planet and are forced out of their home systems, to live between the stars where other displaced intelligences are already in residence. The first signs of this final stage of human civilization in the Solar System begin during the events in Hotline.

==== Free Earthers ====
A result of the invasion and conquest of Earth is the polarizing of human politics in the remaining human worlds between the Free Earther Party and its opponents (who don't seem to have a specific name). Free Earthers are intransigently unreconciled to the loss of Humanity's original world and are committed to continued resistance to the invaders and eventual liberation of Earth. Boss Tweed, the main villain of The Ophiuchi Hotline, is an outspoken Free Earther - though in his case it is difficult to distinguish where commitment to the Free Earth cause ends and a simple lust for power begins. The Free Earthers' more pragmatic opponents point out that humanity has not found any effective means of opposing the Invaders' overwhelming four-dimensional weapons - or even understanding how they work; that Humanity is doing quite well on the remaining Eight Worlds; and that provoking the Invaders would not free the Earth but might endanger what humans still have. Ultimately, these cautions prove to have been completely justified; the Free Earthers' attempt to attack Jupiter does no real harm to the Invaders (as far as humans can see) but does provoke them into destroying the Eight Worlds and altogether expelling humans from the Solar System. As is eventually disclosed, this outcome was virtually inevitable. In every system which was invaded before and where the hitherto dominant species was driven off its home world in order to protect that world's Cetaceans, there always develops an intransigent faction seeking to liberate the home planet, and its actions always ultimately cause the Invaders to drive the species altogether out of its original system. Since it already happened so many times before, presumably the Invaders in Humanity's Solar System anticipated it from the start and were patiently waiting for the Free Earthers to provide them with a pretext - though Humanity remains almost completely ignorant of who the Invaders truly are and how their minds work.

==== Heinleiners ====
The novel Steel Beach introduces the "Heinleiners," a group of idealists and freethinkers attempting to build a starship while following a kind of extreme libertarianism. New technologies such as the "null field" and a "FTL propulsion system" are ascribed to them, rather than coming from the Ophiuchi Hotline as per earlier stories. The group's name is an homage to science fiction author Robert A. Heinlein. Their primary inventor and "leader" uses the pseudonym "Valentine Michael Smith", a reference to the main character of the same name from Heinlein's novel Stranger in a Strange Land. Hildy's discussions with Smith are usually a give-and-take discussion of the costs and benefits of their philosophy versus the minimalist autocracy of how the Central Computer runs Luna, with neither side being idealized.

The Heinleiners are referenced by Sparky Valentine in The Golden Globe but do not appear.

== Locations ==
=== King City ===
Apparently a settlement on the far side of Luna from Earth, it features in several stories, including "Options", a story about the early days when people can change sex at will. In "Picnic on Nearside" two adolescents leave King City to explore the old cities on the other side of Luna, from which Earth can be seen all the time. These were abandoned after the Invasion, as people did not like to look at what they had lost.

=== Disneylands ===
These are vast caverns designed as resorts or simulations of places on Earth.

In "The Phantom of Kansas", the character Fox arranges weather sculptures in the eponymous Kansas disneyland, coordinating lightning strikes and tornadoes in a gigantic light show.

In "Beatnik Bayou", there is a smaller disneyland simulating 1930's Louisiana (with an anachronistic Toyota truck).

The story "Goodbye, Robinson Crusoe" takes place in a similar partly-finished construction on Pluto.

== Technologies ==
Humans possess several advanced technologies, many supposedly derived from information contained in the "Ophiuchi Hotline", a stream of data traveling on a laser beam, apparently from the star 70 Ophiuchi. The novel Steel Beach describes new technologies: the "null field" and a "FTL propulsion system". These are attributed to "Valentine Michael Smith", the "leader" of a group of idealists known as the "Heinleiners", and whose pseudonym is an homage to Heinlein and his novel Stranger in a Strange Land.

=== Nullfield ===
A variant on the "force field" idea, the nullfield can wrap any object or volume in a shell which cannot be penetrated by anything, except gravity and certain kinds of light. Worn like a second skin, it is the ultimate spacesuit. It can also be a domed tent for life on the surface of Luna, Mercury or Venus. To someone outside, a nullfield looks like a perfect mirror in the shape of whatever it contains. In the stories, people in nullfield suits survive falling into Jupiter, skimming the outer atmosphere of the Sun, walking on the surface of Venus, and being buried alive on Mercury (though the kinetic energy of being shot can cause fatal heat buildup). Two nullfields can merge, allowing people wearing them to touch each other, making for a way of passing the time when buried alive, waiting to be rescued. A nullfield can also be used as a doorway between pressurized quarters and vacuum. A person with a personal suit generator can walk through the nullfield doorway from air to vacuum, and their suit will form automatically.

=== Symbiotic spacesuits ===
Usually called "Symbs", these are a semi-living material which can supply all the needs of a human body, requiring only sunlight and some trace elements. A Symb will enfold and penetrate the body of someone who wants to enter into symbiosis with it, forming a Symb Pair. One of the side effects is that the Symb forms a personality of its own in the brain of the human. It also vastly increases the efficiency of the brain, and enhances artistic abilities. Almost all Symb Pairs live in the rings of Saturn, trading artworks for their few material needs. Symbs appear in the novel The Ophiuchi Hotline and the short stories "Gotta Sing, Gotta Dance" and "Equinoctial".

In "Equinoctial", two factions of Symb Pairs are engaged in a Holy War. One faction is intent on coloring the second ("B") ring of Saturn red using genetically engineered bacteria, as a kind of cosmic statement. The other faction intend to prevent this and reverse any coloring they find. Both sides are deadly serious in this, the one considering the coloring of the rings a Holy Mission fully worth the devotion of one's life and justifying the killing of anyone interfering with this task; the other faction is equally sure that coloring the rings is a Sacrilege grave enough to kill those involved in it and to devote one's life to reversing it. The struggle is expected to last for millennia as each side tries to out-populate the other, often by kidnapping each other's children - and it seems the rest of the Eight Worlds are content to let them continue their war, no one trying to stop it and make peace. A third faction lives in the outer "A" ring and takes no part in the war, preferring to produce art to sell as needed. Although Saturn is a gas giant like Jupiter, the Invaders clearly have no interest in it, or any human activity in its vicinity.

In The Ophiuchi Hotline, the Symbs are a trojan horse of sorts. If the demands of the Hotline operators are not met, the Symb Pairs will transform into unstoppable warriors capable of destroying all human space habitats. However the demands consist only of allowing alien minds to assimilate human culture by riding along in the minds of selected people.

=== Genetic manipulation ===
Humans in the Eight Worlds use information from the Hotline to create new animal and plant species, but manipulating human DNA is illegal. This is an important plot point in the final episode of the series The Ophiuchi Hotline. Minor modifications of the body are routine, such as the addition of gills for underwater breathing (Goodbye, Robinson Crusoe) or decorative alterations, such as growing fur on various parts of the body. A popular modification consists of replacing feet with grasping hand-like structures called "peds", which are especially useful in microgravity. In The Ophiuchi Hotline a character known as "Javelin" takes modification to extremes by having only one arm and one leg, with a "ped", at opposite corners of a slim body. Other characters dispense with legs altogether for life in space.

=== Personality recording ===
The state of a person's brain can be preserved, and replayed into a new brain. This has various uses.

People can record their personalities and all their memories into storage, along with a sample of their tissue. If they subsequently die, a clone can be given all the memories that were backed up, effectively restoring the person to life. In The Ophiuchi Hotline, it is revealed that the law provides for a sentence of "death with immediate reprieve" where a criminal is killed and a clone is revived with memories from before the commission of the crime. The "innocent" copy has to undergo therapy to avoid a repeat of the criminal act. This sentence can even be applied to simple assault, as in "Beatnik Bayou", if the crime is severe enough.

The Eight Worlds have a kind of tourism where one's personality can be transferred into some other brain to absorb some experience, followed by re-playing that into the original brain. In the story "Overdrawn at the Memory Bank" a man's personality is recorded and placed in the brain of a lioness in one of the wildlife reserves on Luna.

=== Black holes ===
Black holes are a major source of energy for the Eight Worlds' society. They are quite rare but can be found - if one is persistent enough and lucky - in the space beyond Pluto. A single black hole, when dragged back into the system and installed in a power station, would be enough for a prospector to live in wealth for the rest of his or her life. Such prospectors - the successors of historical gold prospectors - spend up to twenty years at a time in solitary voyages, constantly keeping an eye on their mass detector and hoping for the one great strike which would make their fortune. Holehunters tend to be greedy, self-centered and self-sufficient. When more than one happens to discover the same hole, one of them tends to have "an accident", far away from any kind of law and order and into which the authorities don't inquire too closely. The propulsion jets used by the prospectors' ships can be made into deadly weapons, able to vaporize a rival's ship in a split second.

As recounted in "Lollipop and the Tar Baby", there is an additional complicating factor which humans are unaware of - i.e. the black holes (or at least some of them) are sentient beings, highly intelligent, with enormous knowledge gathered during millions of years of life, and who don't at all like the idea of being trapped inside a human power station. From intercepted radio signals they can and do study humans and gain detailed knowledge of their society, law and technology. The holes can communicate with humans at will and are able to manipulate them. At the same time, such intelligent black holes in no way share human values and human morality; to them, human beings and human ships, like any other kind of matter, are simply food. The black holes have no interest in humans knowing any of that, and some of the "accidents" afflicting holehunters are due to them rather than to human rivals. The protagonist of "Tar Baby", who discovers it and survives, has very good reasons to keep the knowledge to herself and avoid drawing attention to what she had been doing in the far reaches of space.

=== Singularity ===
At the end of The Ophiuchi Hotline, one of the characters is translated by the Invaders from the far future of Earth to the source of the Hotline, where other characters have arrived by ship. She arrives holding something inside a "nullfield". The aliens who run the Hotline recognize this as a singularity that can be used to nullify mass and momentum, providing the means to create a low-fuel interstellar drive. At some point in their occupation of a system the Invaders allow the races they displace to obtain a singularity. This is usually followed by the extermination of those who do not leave the system.

== Consistency ==
In the Author's Note of Steel Beach, Varley states:

This story appears to be part of a future history of mine, often called the Eight Worlds. It does share background, characters, and technology with earlier stories of mine... What it doesn't share is a chronology. The reason for this is simple: the thought of going back, rereading all those old stories, and putting them in coherent order filled me with ennui... Steel Beach is not really part of the Eight Worlds future history. Or the Eight Worlds is not really a future history, since that implies an orderly progression of events. Take your pick.

While there are small details throughout the series which do not match up, this is especially true of Steel Beach and its sequel. Any plot/character descriptions in this article should be read with this in mind.

== Bibliography ==
=== Short stories ===
- "Bagatelle" (1974) ^{BM}
- "The Barbie Murders" (1978) ^{BM}^{,} ^{JVR}
- "Beatnik Bayou" (1980) ^{BM}^{,} ^{JVR}
- "The Bellman" (originally written in 1978 for the never released Last Dangerous Visions anthology, finally was published in 2003) ^{JVR}
- "The Black Hole Passes" (1975) ^{PV}
- "Blue Champagne" (1981) ^{BC}
- "Equinoctial" (1976) ^{BM}
- "The Funhouse Effect" (1976) ^{BM}
- "Good-bye, Robinson Crusoe" (1977) ^{BM}
- "Gotta Sing, Gotta Dance" (1976) ^{PV}^{,} ^{JVR}
- "In the Bowl" (1975) ^{PV}
- "Lollipop and the Tar Baby" (1977) ^{BC}^{,} ^{BM}
- "Options" (1979) ^{BC}^{,} ^{JVR}
- "Overdrawn at the Memory Bank" (1976) ^{PV}^{,} ^{JVR}
- "The Phantom of Kansas" (1976) ^{PV}^{,} ^{JVR}
- "Picnic On Nearside" (1974) ^{BM}^{,} ^{JVR}
- "Retrograde Summer" (1975) ^{PV}
- "Tango Charlie and Foxtrot Romeo" (1985) ^{BC}^{,} ^{JVR}

=== Novels ===
- The Ophiuchi Hotline (1977) - Locus Award nominee, 1978
- Steel Beach (1992) - Hugo and Locus Awards nominee, 1993
- The Golden Globe (1998) - Locus Award nominee, 1999
- Irontown Blues (2018)

=== Collections ===
- ^PV The Persistence of Vision (1978)
- ^BM The Barbie Murders (1980) - later republished as Picnic On Nearside (1984)
- ^BC Blue Champagne (1986)
- ^JVR The John Varley Reader (2004)
