= Wizard (novel) =

1980 novel by John Varley

- First edition cover (hardcover)
- Author: John Varley
- Cover artist: Tony Russo
- Language: English
- Series: Gaea trilogy
- Genre: Science fiction
- Publisher: Berkley Books
- Publication date: 1980
- Publication place: United States
- Media type: Print (hardback & paperback)
- Pages: 338
- ISBN: 0-399-12472-1
- OCLC: 5726669
- Dewey Decimal: 813/.5/4
- LC Class: PS3572.A724 W58
- Preceded by: Titan
- Followed by: Demon

Wizard is a 1980 science fiction novel by American writer John Varley. It is the second book in his Gaea Trilogy. It was nominated for the Hugo Award for Best Novel in 1981.

== Plot summary ==
Wizard takes place in 2100, seventy-five years after the events in Titan. Cirocco has become an alcoholic, apparently due to the strain of being the Wizard. Gaby Plauget has taken up the slack, carrying out special projects for Gaea such as building the Circum-Gaea Highway, in return for which she gets some of the benefits Cirocco enjoys, including apparently perpetual youth. Gaea herself is bored, spending her time in the hub with her sycophants and watches old movies.

Gaea provides miracle cures to those who come to her from Earth and prove themselves worthy by doing something "heroic" – for example, travel once round the circumference of the great wheel. This provides Gaea with entertainment, as she arranges hazards for them to overcome or die trying; and by providing cures for diseases, Gaea proves her value to humanity so that they do not turn on her and destroy her.

Chris Major and Robin the Nine-Fingered are two pilgrims looking for a cure. Chris suffers from psychotic episodes which are often accompanied by paranormal "luck". Robin is a member of a group of latter day witches living in an O'Neill orbital habitat who has a strange epilepsy that only manifests in gravity higher than the Moon's. She claims that she bit off one of her fingers to drive away the fits, though it is later revealed she cut it off.

The two meet with Gaea in the hub. She explains the requirement to do something heroic and drops both through a trap door in the hub. They take about an hour to fall to the rim, reaching a high but survivable terminal velocity in the dense atmosphere. Robin is rescued by one of the Angels who live in the spokes. Chris blacks out during the fall it is implied that his "luck" causes him to fall onto one of the blimps that travel around the rim. His next memory is of the Titanide festival.

Robin, Chris, Gaby, Cirocco and four Titanides set out on a heroic trek. Gaby and Cirocco have a hidden agenda: they want to canvass the regional brains in order to overthrow Gaea, whom they see as being irretrievably insane.

During the trip, the cause of Cirocco's alcoholism is revealed. As the price for the discontinuation of the Angel/Titanide War, Gaea has made the Titanides dependent on Cirocco to have children. Only her saliva can activate the eggs they produce, so that they can be implanted in a host mother to grow. The responsibility for an entire race's survival is more than Cirocco can bear; with resignation from her position as Wizard impossible and suicide ruled out by her love for the Titanides, her only release is alcohol-fueled oblivion.

The hazards of the trip include buzz-bombs, living creatures with pulsejet engines that live high up on the support cables. They attack living beings, including humans and Titanides, attempting to capture them as food, and present a particular threat to pilgrims with their barbed noses and razor-sharp wings. Slowly the journey reduces the crew, killing first one of the Titanides and then, in an attack plotted by the crazed crewmember Gene, Gaby, too, is killed. All are separated. Cirocco and her Titanide companion Hornpipe are left on the Rim surface, while Robin and Chris are trapped underground, with the Titanide Valiha, who is not only pregnant but has been badly injured. Eventually Robin has to climb back to the surface for help and leave Chris to tend Valiha. She finds herself in one of the Arctic cold zones of the habitat, and almost dies before being rescued.

Cirocco undergoes a complete transformation. She musters her considerable powers to rescue all the remaining expedition members. Robin and Chris, thinking they have earned their cure but been forsaken, go to confront Gaea, only to be told she has already cured them, and they can get lost. Robin discovers that Gaea has also restored her missing finger. Cirocco also confronts Gaea, who offers to restore Gaby to life. Cirocco considers this, but realizes that the result would be a puppet of Gaea. She shoots and kills the body Gaea has been using to talk to people, then burns it. As Gaea is in reality an intelligence living in the hub itself, the death of this body does not kill her; but it is Cirocco's way of resigning. Hereinafter, she is no longer the Wizard; she is the Demon. She escapes by falling through a spoke, to be rescued by her friends the Angels. Gaea's response is to bombard the rim with the cathedrals that she had been replicating with human help.
