= The Barbie Murders (collection) =

Collection of short stories by John Varley

- First edition
- Author: John Varley
- Cover artist: David Plourde
- Language: English
- Genre: Science fiction
- Publisher: Berkley Books
- Publication date: 1980
- Publication place: United States
- Media type: Print
- Pages: 260 pp
- ISBN: 0-425-04580-3
- OCLC: 6741261
- Dewey Decimal: 813/.5/4
- LC Class: PZ4.V299 Pe PS3572.A724

The Barbie Murders is a 1980 collection of science fiction stories by American writer John Varley. The book was republished under the title Picnic on Nearside in 1984.

== Contents ==
The collection includes nine stories:

- "Bagatelle", originally published in Galaxy Science Fiction, August 1976
- "The Funhouse Effect", originally published in The Magazine of Fantasy & Science Fiction, December 1976
- "The Barbie Murders", originally published in Isaac Asimov's Science Fiction Magazine, February 1978
- "Equinoctial", originally published in Ascents of Wonder, 1977
- "Manikins", originally published in Amazing Stories, January 1976
- "Beatnik Bayou", originally published in New Voices III, 1980
- "Good-Bye, Robinson Crusoe", originally published in Isaac Asimov's Science Fiction Magazine, Spring 1977
- "Lollipop and the Tar Baby", originally published in Orbit 19, 1977
- "Picnic on Nearside", originally published in The Magazine of Fantasy & Science Fiction, August 1974

All of the stories but "Manikins" take place in Varley's Eight Worlds future history.

== Awards ==
The Barbie Murders won the 1981 Locus Award for Best Single-Author Collection.
