= Titan (Varley novel) =

1979 science fiction novel by John Varley

- Cover of first edition (hardcover)
- Author: John Varley
- Illustrator: Freff
- Cover artist: Ron Walotsky
- Language: English
- Series: Gaea Trilogy
- Genre: Science fiction
- Publisher: Berkley Books
- Publication date: 1979
- Publication place: United States
- Media type: Print (hardback & paperback)
- Pages: 302
- Award: Locus Award for Best Science Fiction Novel (1980)
- ISBN: 0-399-12326-1
- OCLC: 4493124
- Dewey Decimal: 813/.5/4
- LC Class: PZ4.V299 Ti 1979 PS3572.A724
- Followed by: Wizard

Titan is a science fiction novel by American writer John Varley, the first book in his Gaea Trilogy, published in 1979. It won the 1980 Locus Award for Best Science Fiction Novel and was nominated for both the Nebula Award for Best Novel in 1979, and the Hugo Award for Best Novel in 1980. It imagines a visit to Saturn's satellites by a scientific team from Earth who are soon enwrapped in a mystery after they discover extraterrestrial life.

== Plot ==
A scientific expedition to the planet Saturn in 2025, aboard the ship Ringmaster, discovers a strange satellite in orbit around the planet. Commanding the ship is Cirocco Jones, a tall NASA career woman, aided by astronomer Gaby Plauget, the clone twin physicists April and August Polo, pilot Eugene Springfield, physician Calvin Greene and engineer Bill (whose last name is never given).

As they reach the satellite they realize it is a huge hollow torus, a Stanford torus habitat. Before they can report this, the ship is entangled in cables from the object. The crew is rendered unconscious and later wake up inside the habitat. Initially separated, Cirroco and Gaby find each other and travel together through the world inside the torus to find the rest of the crew.

They find Calvin living as a companion inside a Blimp, an intelligent gasbag a kilometer long, one of many that swim forever in the air inside the habitat. Calvin can speak to the blimp and understand its responses, which consist of whistles. His blimp's name is Whistlestop, in human terms. Calvin helps Gaby and Cirocco find the other crew members (except April). He ultimately decides to leave his human companions to live with the blimp permanently.

The remaining companions encounter the Titanides, strange centaur-like beings who speak a language based on music. Cirocco finds she has the ability to speak their language. The Titanides are in a perpetual state of war with the Angels, birdlike humanoid creatures. They fight because of an impulse that occurs when they are near each other, but do not know why they have the impulse.

The humans learn from the Titanides that the torus itself is alive, and a controlling intelligence, called Gaea, lives in the hub of the torus 600 km above them. Cirocco, Gaby, and Gene decide to climb up to this place using the support cables that maintain the structure against centrifugal force. During the journey, Gene's behavior becomes increasingly erratic. He rapes and assaults Gaby and leaves her for dead, and then rapes Cirocco. However, Gaby is not dead and rescues Cirocco, cutting off Gene's ear with a hatchet and destroying his face. The two women continue climbing for months. High in one of the spokes of the great wheel they find April, who has been transformed into an angel. She, like the other Angels, is solitary by nature, and can hardly bear to be near them.

Finally reaching the hub, they discover Gaea, who presents herself as a frumpy middle-aged woman. She explains that the great wheel is very old. Some of the regional intelligences around the rim have rebelled against the center, and it was one of these regional intelligences that captured the Ringmaster and altered its crew, not Gaea herself. Gaea rescued them and, unable to change them back, placed them where they would be happy.

Gaea has been watching television signals from Earth and is obsessed by movies, especially from Hollywood's Golden Age. Having seen war movies, and deciding that humanity will inevitably declare war on her, the Titanide-Angel war was a way for her to practice.

Gaea offers to give Cirocco a long life and unusual abilities in exchange for being Gaea's agent at the Rim, her Wizard. Cirocco accepts, with the condition that the war between the Titanides and Angels must stop.

== Awards ==
- Nebula Award nominee, 1979
- Locus Award winner, 1980
- Hugo Award nominee, 1980
