= The Golden Globe =

1998 novel by John Varley

- First edition
- Author: John Varley
- Cover artist: Danilo Dukac
- Language: English
- Series: Eight Worlds
- Genre: Science fiction
- Publisher: Berkley Books
- Publication date: 1998
- Publication place: United States
- Media type: Print (hardcover & paperback)
- Pages: 528
- ISBN: 0-441-00643-4
- OCLC: 38527945
- Dewey Decimal: 813/.5/4
- Preceded by: Steel Beach
- Followed by: Irontown Blues

The Golden Globe is a 1998 science fiction novel by American writer John Varley. The book takes places a few years after the conclusion of Steel Beach. It was nominated for Best Science Fiction Novel during the 1999 Locus Awards.

== Plot ==
The Golden Globe takes place in Varley’s "Eight Worlds" universe. The Solar System has been colonized by human refugees fleeing aliens (known as "the Invaders"). Earth and Jupiter are off-limits to humanity, but Earth's Moon and the other planets and moons of the Solar System have all become populated. There are also minor colonies set in the Oort cloud beyond the Solar System. The Golden Globe story is told initially from a first person perspective, but a substantial portion of the book comes in the form of extended flashbacks.

The Golden Globe in question is Luna, Earth's Moon and the most heavily inhabited world in the Solar System since the Invaders obliterated human civilization on Earth.

The novel begins as a first person account of Sparky Valentine's adventures in the outer worlds of the Solar System as he attempts to make his way to Luna to play King Lear in an upcoming production. Valentine is a consummate actor and a skilled con man. It is by exercising the latter skill that he runs afoul of the Charonese Mafia, personified by the cold-blooded and unkillable assassin Isambard Comfort.

The story is punctuated by several extended flashback sequences in which we learn that Valentine's father, a supremely egotistical and domineering stage actor by the name of John Barrymore Valentine, has groomed his son almost from birth to follow in his footsteps. It is Valentine Sr.'s egotism and obsession with the stage that sets the tone for much of the flashback material.

While his father is auditioning for a role and has left young Kenneth sitting in a waiting room, Valentine wanders a little and gets swept up to audition for a part in a new children's adventure show called Sparky and His Gang and is cast in the lead role. As the show becomes increasingly popular, Valentine Sr. interferes more and more, and becomes more difficult for his son and the producers of the show to deal with.

We learn in these flashback segments that Valentine Sr. subjects his son to monstrous and potentially fatal child abuse. This is framed quite realistically, and Valentine Sr. is apparently aware of but unable to control his nearly homicidal rage.

At times, both in the main story and in flashback, Valentine meets with a mysterious character named Elwood. It is ambiguous in the narrative exactly what type of being Elwood is; however, as the novel progresses, both in the present and in flashback, the character is more fully identified as Elwood P. Dowd and said to look very much like actor James Stewart, who played a character of the same name in Harvey.

Though the reader gradually comes to believe Elwood is a figment of Valentine's imagination, the climactic confrontation between Valentine and his father blurs this distinction considerably. However, Valentine narrates his own flashbacks for the reader, and as much as states that he may be an unreliable narrator.

It is revealed in both the main and flashback storylines that Valentine killed (or believed himself to have killed) his father. In the main storyline, he is, after 70 years on the run, eventually put on trial for this murder, and his case is weighed by the Central Computer of Luna. Genetic tests reveal that Valentine is actually a clone of his father (further evidence of the maniacal self-absorption of the father). The fact that cloning was illegal at the time of his father's murder causes the Central Computer to declare that no crime was committed, as the only legal remedy in place at the time was for one clone or the other to be destroyed.

At the end of the novel, Valentine says that he has reclaimed his fortune accrued from the revenue of his children's show (long inaccessible to him during his life on the run), now making him the single wealthiest person in the solar system. Using this newfound wealth, he throws in his lot with the Heinleiners, a reclusive group of libertarian idealists who are building a starship and planning a voyage to the stars.
