= Mammoth (novel) =

2005 novel by John Varley

- First edition (publ. Ace Books); Cover artist: Matt Stawicki
- Author: John Varley
- Language: English
- Publisher: Ace Books
- Publication date: 2005
- ISBN: 0-441-01281-7 (first edition)
- Dewey Decimal: 813.54
- LC Class: PS3572.A724 M36

Mammoth is a 2005 novel by author John Varley. The book centers around the concept of time travel, and discusses the concept that there may be limits to science.

== Plot ==
The chapters are numbered in chronological order but appear based on a narrative order instead. For example, chapter one is chronologically the first event to happen in the storyline but is at the end of the book. Mammoth opens with the billionaire scientist Howard Christian, and his attempts to clone a mammoth, largely for the sake of the countless circuses he owns. His team finds a mammoth frozen in ice, along with two human beings, one of whom appears to be wearing a wristwatch. His assistant, Warburton, is initially convinced that this is a joke, but Howard takes the notion of time travel seriously, and hires physicist Matt Wright to study a metal briefcase which is presumably a time machine. Matt soon falls in love with Susan Morgan, the elephant keeper who is in charge of the mammoth project, who works in the same warehouse.

Two religious zealots and an animal rights activist launch an attack against the mammoth cloners, but accidentally find themselves in Wright's section of the warehouse. One of them whacks the time machine, which, unbeknownst to him, turns on a tiny light in the machine. When Matt and Susan come to the lab to investigate, they are transported back many thousands of years, to the last major ice age. After a few adventures, they return, with a herd of mammoths in tow. They appear in the middle of Los Angeles, where all but two of the mammoths are slaughtered by police and a high-power laser Christian has in his tower. Matt leaves Susan to work out the details of time travel.

Five years later, Susan is the trainer of the two remaining mammoths, Little Fuzzy and Big Mama. Matt returns, explaining that he had been held captive for weeks in what might have been a government facility. Susan reveals that she wants to free Little Fuzzy. With the help of another animal rights activist, Susan and Matt bring Little Fuzzy to Canada. When Howard and his movie star girlfriend Andrea go to retrieve the mammoth, they are sent back to the ice age, where they attempt to introduce more advanced (but still primitive) technology to the locals, and Little Fuzzy is allowed to go free.

== Critical reception ==
Publishers Weekly wrote, "Varley's sparkling wit pulls one surprise after another out of this unconventional blend of science and social commentary with real people convincingly doing unreal things." The Lima News said it was a "rollicking tale filled with mystery, suspense, and the intrigues of time travel". The Daily Oklahoman called it Varley's best book in decades. Kirkus Reviews criticized it as "barely tepid" with a "contrived mess of a plot".
