= Gaea trilogy =

Science fiction novels by John Varley

Gaea Trilogy
- Titan; Wizard; Demon
- Author: John Varley
- Country: USA
- Language: English
- Genre: science fiction
- Publisher: Berkley Books
- Published: 1979-1984
- No. of books: 3

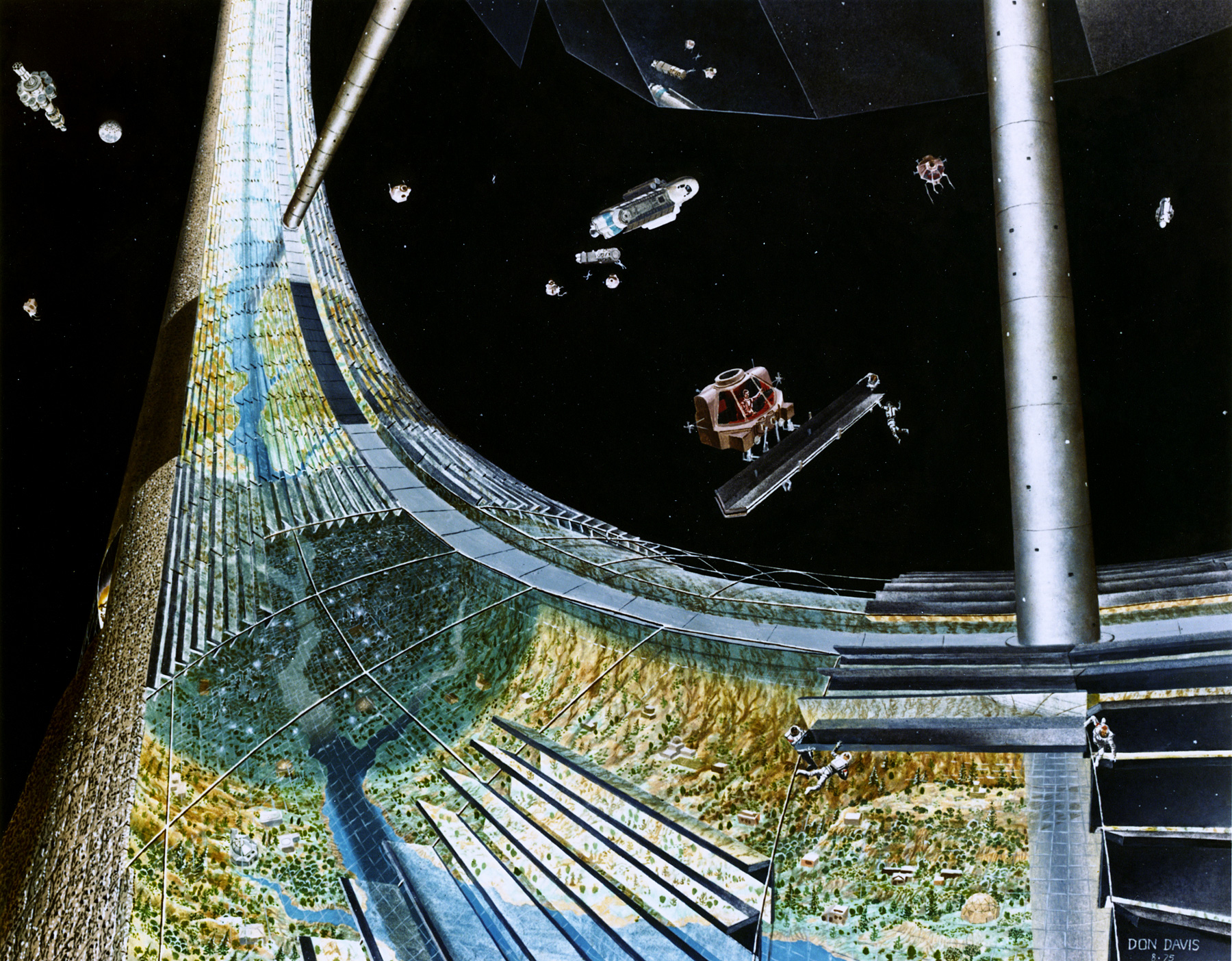
An artist's rendering of a Stanford torus in the same configuration as the fictional artificial satellite of Saturn, Gaea

The Gaea Trilogy consists of three science fiction novels by John Varley. The stories tell of humanity's encounter with a living being in the shape of a 1,300 km diameter Stanford torus, inhabited by many different species, most notably the centaur-like Titanides, in orbit around the planet Saturn.

The novels are:

- Titan (1979)
  - Nebula Award nominee, 1979; Hugo Award nominee, Locus Award winner, 1980
- Wizard (1980)
  - Hugo and Locus Award nominees, 1981
- Demon (1984)
  - Locus Award nominee, 1985
