= Blue Champagne (collection) =

Collection of short stories by John Varley

- Author: John Varley
- Cover artist: Todd Cameron Hamilton
- Language: English
- Genre: Science fiction
- Publisher: Dark Harvest, Berkley Books
- Publication date: 1986
- Publication place: United States
- Media type: Print
- Pages: 290 pp
- ISBN: 0-425-09336-0
- OCLC: 14639057
- Dewey Decimal: 813/.5/4
- LC Class: PZ4.V299 Pe PS3572.A724

Blue Champagne is a 1986 collection of science fiction stories by American writer John Varley. It was published as a hardcover in January 1986, followed by a paperback edition in November.

== Contents ==
The collection includes eight stories, four of which take place in Varley's Eight Worlds future history.

- "The Pusher", originally published in The Magazine of Fantasy & Science Fiction, 1981
- "Blue Champagne", originally published in New Voices 4, 1981
- "Tango Charlie and Foxtrot Romeo", first published in this collection
- "Options", originally published in Universe 9, 1979
- "Lollipop and the Tar Baby", originally published in Orbit 19, 1977, previously appeared in Varley's 1980 collection The Barbie Murders
- "The Manhattan Phone Book (Abridged)", originally published at Westercon 37, 1984
- "The Unprocessed Word", first published in this collection
- "Press Enter■", originally published in Isaac Asimov's Science Fiction Magazine, 1984

== Awards ==
Blue Champagne won the 1987 Locus Award for Best Collection.
