= Corinne Jacker =

American screenwriter and author

Corinne Jacker (June 29, 1933 – January 11, 2013; born Corinne Muriel Litvin) was an American playwright and screenwriter.

== Life ==
Corinne Jacker, born Corinne Muriel Litvin on June 29, 1933 in Chicago, to Thomas and Theresa Bellak Litvin. Corinne earned Bachelor's and master's degrees at Northwestern University majoring in theatre. She married Richard Jacker, and kept their last name after divorcing. Corinne Jacker died at home in Manhattan on January 11, 2013, at age 79. She had no children.

== Writing career ==
Jacker moved to New York City at age 25 with the goal of establishing herself as a writer. She was over 40 by time she achieved significant success, with the works she is most known for. Her 1975 Off-Broadway play "Bits & Pieces", which won an Obie and her 1976 play "Harry Outside" which also won the Obie Award. She wrote a number of other plays as well including My Life where, in 1976, Christopher Reeve was acting when he was cast for the title role in Superman.

Ms. Jacker also wrote several TV scripts including the episode "John Adams, President," for the mini-series The Adams Chronicles, in 1976; as well as episodes of The Best of Families in 1977, both produced for public television.

In 1981 Jacker became the head writer for soap opera Another World on NBC but writing for a daytime soap was not a job she enjoyed. After just one season she quit and later told a biographer "I hated it."

== Reception ==
Victor Wishna, in his book In Their Company: Portraits of American Playwrights (2006), wrote that her work "could be very lighthearted, but the subject matter was certainly serious — things like divorce, the death of loved ones, living with terminal illness, petty differences that can define and also destroy relationships."

== Selected works ==
- 1964: Man, Memory, and Machines
- 1968: The Black Flag of Anarchy: Antistatism in the United States
- 1974: Bits & Pieces
- 1975: Harry Outside
- 1977 Night Thoughts and Terminal
- 1981: Domestic Issues
- 1983: Overdrawn at the Memory Bank
