= Demon (novel) =

1984 novel by John Varley

- Cover of first edition (hardcover)
- Author: John Varley
- Cover artist: Tony Russo
- Language: English
- Series: Gaea Trilogy
- Genre: Science fiction
- Publisher: Berkley Books
- Publication date: 1984
- Publication place: United States
- Media type: Print (hardback & paperback)
- Pages: 464
- ISBN: 0-399-12945-6
- OCLC: 10558373
- Dewey Decimal: 813/.54 19
- LC Class: PS3572.A724 D4 1984
- Preceded by: Wizard

Demon is a science fiction novel by American writer John Varley, published in 1984. The third and final book in his Gaea Trilogy, it was nominated to the Locus Award.

== Plot ==
Demon takes place in the years 2113 through 2121, thirteen to twenty-one years after the events of Wizard.

Earth is in the grip of a protracted nuclear war, possibly started by Gaea herself. Some survivors are rescued by mysterious pods called mercy flights that bring them to Gaea. They are cured of all their physical ills, but still mentally damaged from the war, they are dumped in the twilight city of Bellinzona in Dione, an anarchic place where the local brain is dead, Gaea has limited control, and criminals run the show. Due to the war, humankind's future is now in the wheel, and at the mercy of its senile ruler.

Cirocco Jones has become a fugitive and resistance leader, supported by the Titanides, who call her the Captain, and the Angels, who call her the Wing Commander.

The increasingly demented and film-obsessed Gaea has replaced the Avatar that Jones destroyed at the end of Wizard with a 50-foot-tall (15 m) replica of Marilyn Monroe. She spends her time in a traveling film festival of her own making, called Pandemonium, where she is attended by various humans and many bizarre creatures of her own creation, such as living film cameras.

Gaea has developed deathsnakes, which infest and reanimate the corpses of humans and other creatures who die in the wheel. Leading these zombies are horrifying beings called Priests: undead field commanders made by Gaea from parts of her human victims.

Cirocco and her companions find some degree of safety in Bellinzona. It is revealed that all the captured Ringmaster crew were fitted with parasitic, worm-like spies living inside their brains. Cirocco's alcoholism was actually a means of obscuring at least some of her thoughts from the spy, and hence Gaea. Cirocco's brain parasite is extracted by a Titanide surgeon and imprisoned in a jar. Nicknamed Snitch, it is both a part of Gaea's fragmented and disintegrating mind, and a creature in its own right, able to talk, feel pain, and apparently recover from any injury. Cirocco ruthlessly exploits it as a source of information on Gaea's schemes, using a mixture of torture and bribery: Snitch has emerged from her alcohol-addled brain with an addiction to liquor.

As a result of the parasite broadcasting every thought and perception to Gaea, Gaby's personality has survived her physical death; she now exists as a rogue intelligence in the hub and nerve-center of the habitat. She is able to communicate with Cirocco, and together they hatch plans for the future of the wheel.

Chris Major has stayed in Gaea, where he is mutating into a Titanide. Robin of the Coven had returned to her people, but now returns to Gaea, along with her two children: a 19-year-old daughter named Nova, and an infant son, Adam. Having a son is anathema in her female-only community. The children were not planned, but are offspring of herself and Chris, owing to genetic material planted in her when she last was on Gaea and triggered to implant at later times.

Robin, along with her children, is reunited with Chris and Cirocco, and Nova immediately develops a crush on Cirocco. They also meet Conal Ray, a friend and lieutenant of Cirocco's, originally a none-too-bright bodybuilder from Canada and a descendant of Ringmaster crew member Gene who came to Gaea with an ill-formed plan to kill Cirocco. Chris asks Robin for custody of Adam, as his last link to humanity when he becomes a Titanide.

Cirocco learns that Adam shares her ability to activate Titanide eggs, and therefore represents the race's future, as well as a means of controlling them, just as Gaea's agents kidnap the infant. Gaea has arranged his birth so he can be Cirocco's successor, and his kidnapping is intended to force her into a confrontation. After a failed rescue attempt by the group, Chris decides to surrender to Pandemonium, now permanently located in the region of Hyperion, so that he can be near Adam.

Pandemonium is a now a fortified area dedicated to classic Hollywood themes, including a Yellow Brick Road and a replica of the house "Tara" from Gone with the Wind. Returning to base, Cirocco finds that all the zombies used in the kidnapping have died. The cause appears to be a "love potion" that Nova concocted from kitchen spices along with her own blood and pubic hair. This appears to be another of Gaea's pranks, but it is used to exterminate the deathsnakes, and thus the zombies. This leaves Gaea with a labor shortage in the new Pandemonium. Her senility has advanced to the point that she can no longer create new hazards for the human and Titanide populations.

Some months pass while Cirocco's forces regroup. Adam is beginning to see Gaea as a mother figure, and desperate to recover him, Cirocco uses her influence among the Titanides to conquer Bellinzona, imposing law and order with the intent of eventually raising an army to attack Pandemonium. In time, through her unusual mixture of charisma and ruthlessness, she manages to transform the inhabitants' disorganized chaos into a genuine community. She kills off the gangster leaders who ruled much of the city, and co-opts groups such as the "Free Females" and "Vigilantes", who used force to protect their enclaves.

Cirocco guides nearly 40,000 human soldiers and several thousand Titanides some 1500+ kilometers around the wheel, dealing with the various horrors living in the regions of the wheel, and fending off attacks from the Gaean Air Force, the successors to the old buzz-bombs. These new creatures are armed with rocket bullets, smart missiles, and bombs. On Cirocco's side are a set of highly advanced airplanes that she imported from Earth to destroy the first set of buzz-bombs. The pilots are a hastily assembled collection of people trained by Conal. With Gaby Plauget, Cirocco enlists the help of some of the Angels in a preemptive strike to destroy the Air Force's refueling bases. This prevents most of the attackers from reaching her army. Conal's own air force destroy the rest at the cost of several planes, including Conal's own. He parachutes down to join Cirocco's army.

When the army finally reaches Pandemonium, Cirocco's attack is a mixture of display and deadly force. Robin's former familiar Nasu, an anaconda lost in the previous novel, has become gigantic while living in the Wheel. She attacks Gaea's avatar and damages it severely, but is killed. Whistlestop the blimp, with the aged and dying Calvin inside, immolates Gaea in a Hindenburg-like blaze. But Gaea proves able to restore her body from almost any injury. Still, Gaea is lured out of the city to face Cirocco, enabling part of the army to rescue Adam. At that moment Gene, old and addled and living next to the dead remnant of one of the former regional brains, sets off the final blow (instigated by Gaby) by destroying with dynamite one of Gaea's major nerve-centers in full view of his own mind-parasite, which Gaby has removed from his head. Gaea is disoriented enough for Gaby to force her out of the hub, leading to the destruction of the giant Marilyn Monroe avatar in a scene reminiscent of the climactic battle in King Kong. The last fragment of Gaea's mind, in the shape of Snitch, dies in Cirocco's hand. Gaea's final act is to paraphrase last words from a classic movie, Little Caesar. Cirocco is then lifted bodily into the air to join Gaby in the hub of the Wheel.

Gaby, now the new divinity of the wheel, reveals to Cirocco that Gaea was in fact originally an entity distinct from the wheel, and took over just as Gaby has done. Changes of 'management' are a regular occurrence in the enormously long life-cycle of those entities, and all the plotting perpetrated by Gaea throughout the trilogy was aimed at securing her demise and replacement in a manner entertaining and flamboyant enough to suit her. Gaby invites Cirocco to share the position with her, but the former Wizard declines, choosing instead to simply live free for the first time in nearly a century. As she ponders her new and free future, she wonders what she will do next. She leans over, falling from the top of the spoke toward the ground 600 kilometers below, leaving her fate to chance — she is now finally free to live only for herself.

== Characters ==
- Cirocco Jones, former Captain of the ship Ringmaster, former Wizard serving Gaea, now the Demon and enemy of Gaea. Thanks to treatments she received as Wizard, and with continued visits to a location known as the Fountain of Youth, she has unusual abilities, endurance, strength and wisdom.
- Gaea, a being who represents herself as the embodiment and god of the rotating space habitat known as the wheel. In this novel she manifests as a 50-foot tall replica of Marilyn Monroe, living on the rim of the habitat instead of, as before, in the hub.
- Chris Major, a former pilgrim to Gaea who remained in the wheel after his cure. He formed an emotional relationship with the Titanide known as Valiha and is slowly mutating into a Titanide himself.
- Robin the Nine-Fingered, another pilgrim who was cured by Gaea and returned to her home, known as the Coven, in an O'Neill habitat in orbit. The Coven see themselves as witches and practice lesbianism, regarding males as evil. After her return Robin rose to the top of their ruling hierarchy, until her son Adam was born, ruining her life and forcing her to migrate back to Gaea with Adam and her teenage daughter Nova. Both children were fathered by Chris thanks to Gaea's interference in their lives. Robin finds herself attracted to men, to Chris in the previous novel, and to Conal in this one.
- Nova, Robin's tall athletic daughter. She is attracted to Cirocco, accidentally finds a way to kill off the zombies that Gaea has created, and becomes part of the ruling council in Bellinzona, with her mother.
- Gaby Plauget, formerly assistant to the Wizard before her death, now a rogue intelligence inhabiting the same AI matrix as Gaea. Over the course of the novel she becomes more and more powerful and able to manifest herself to her allies.
- Conal Ray, great-great-grandson of Ringmaster's Gene Springfield, who became an avid bodybuilder in his native Canada (reduced to the Northwest Territories and parts of Alberta) before going to Gaea to kill Cirocco, blaming her for his grandfather's death. After being captured and tortured by Cirocco to determine if he was a creature of Gaea, he swore allegiance to her. He also discovered that Gene was still alive.
- Rocky, a Titanide and Conal's close friend. Originally named "Phase-shifter Rock'n'Roll" according to Titanide custom, he was renamed by Cirocco so that nobody would use that name for her. Rocky is both a healer and a fighter. During the course of the story he decides to become a "hindmother", birthing a new Titanide from an egg conceived by himself and Valiha, with Valiha's son Serpent as the "hindfather", who implants and quickens the egg. The new Titanide, already able to communicate with Rocky from within the womb, is called Tambura.
- Trini, introduced in the previous novel as a freelance sex worker, now the leader of the Free Females organization in anarchic Bellinzona.
- Stuart, leader of the Vigilante organization in Bellinzona. Cirocco suspects him of having wielded political power in the past, and having the will to do it again.
- "Luther", one of Gaea's "Priests". Originally the mild-mannered Pastor Lundquist, he was killed and reassembled as Luther. His body is slowly decaying, making it difficult for him to walk and talk, though he has a charisma that can beguile the unwary. He travels with a collection of zombies whom he names for the Apostles. He remembers enough of who he was for Gaby to use him as part of her plan. He dies while opening a gate into Pandemonium so that Cirocco's army can enter to rescue Adam and Chris.
- Calvin, one of Ringmaster's crew who went to live in the giant blimp known as Whistlestop, and who is slowly dying of old age. Whistlestop has become enormous over time, being almost two kilometers long and the largest being in Gaea, after Gaea herself.
- Gene Springfield, one of Ringmaster's crew who became an agent of Gaea, raping both Gaby and Cirocco and eventually killing Gaby. Like the others he has become unnaturally long-lived, but he retains scars from all his injuries, mostly inflicted by Cirocco in their encounters. He takes refuge in the cavern once occupied by the brain controlling the region known as Oceanus, which Gaea pretends is her enemy. The brain died long ago, driving Gaea partly mad in the process, and has been replaced by a giant nerve nexus linking the adjoining regions. When Gaby manifests herself to Cirocco and Conal, taking them to Gene, he behaves like a stereotypical corn-pone comedy character from a western, rather than the intelligent pilot he used to be.
