= Steel Beach =

1992 science fiction novel by John Varley

- First edition
- Author: John Varley
- Cover artist: Todd Cameron Hamilton
- Language: English
- Series: Eight Worlds
- Genre: Science fiction
- Publisher: Berkley Books
- Publication date: 1992
- Publication place: United States
- Media type: Print (hardcover & paperback)
- Pages: 566
- ISBN: 0-441-78565-4
- OCLC: 25410251
- Dewey Decimal: 813/.5/4
- Followed by: The Golden Globe

Steel Beach is a 1992 science fiction novel by American writer John Varley.

The novel was nominated for both the Hugo and Locus Awards for Best Novel.

== Plot ==
Steel Beach takes place in Varley’s "Eight Worlds" universe. The Solar System has been colonized by human refugees fleeing aliens (known as "the Invaders"). Earth and Jupiter are off-limits to humanity, but Earth's Moon and the other planets and moons of the Solar System have all become populated. There are also minor colonies set in the Oort cloud beyond the Solar System itself.

The "steel beach" of the title is Earth's Moon, the most heavily inhabited world in the Solar System since the Invaders obliterated human civilization on Earth. The title alludes to humans being figuratively thrown onto the inhospitable Moon, a parallel to fish making their way onto land in the evolution of amphibians.

The book's protagonist, Hildy Johnson, is a newspaper reporter, named after the male protagonist of the 1928 play and 1931 film The Front Page and the female protagonist of the 1940 film His Girl Friday (Hildy changes gender halfway through the book), who finds trouble beneath the surface of the near-utopian society run by the Central Computer. The Central Computer runs every aspect of every person's life: it is the government, court, information source, and friend to every citizen.

At the beginning of the novel, Hildy has become dissatisfied with life, much like many others on the moon who take part, for example, in destructive activities such as "slash boxing"—a blend of knife fighting and boxing, on which Hildy reports. It is revealed that Hildy has made multiple suicide attempts. Scenes such as a discussion of suicide with a slain slash boxer suggest that Hildy is an unreliable narrator.

The first half of the story deals with behaviors in the future society such as indoctrinations of celebrity heads-in-jars, negotiating with brontosaurus herds to figure out whom they will sacrifice to make burger patties, and Earth-themed "Disneylands" which come complete with snakes, sand and sunburns. The protagonist grew up on a brontosaur ranch run by a no-nonsense rancher with little time for philosophical speculation, and finds solace in the quasi-dedication of the Texas Disneyland's inhabitants to authenticity.

In the second half, Hildy contacts a group of people who have figured out how to exist on the surface without spacesuits. These people reveal that they are hiding from the Central Computer, both to keep their technology secret, and to stay free of secret experiments the Central Computer has been performing on people.

Hildy then learns that the Central Computer has been attempting to clone the deceased and that this would solve Hildy's suicide problem. The Central Computer decides to launch a military raid to eliminate the people, causing its own malfunctions. This raid, and the idea of using brute force to solve the problem, is unsuccessful.
