= Millennium (novel) =

1983 science fiction novel by John Varley

- Cover of first cover edition
- Author: John Varley
- Language: English
- Genre: Science fiction novel
- Publisher: Berkley Books
- Publication date: June 1983
- Publication place: United States
- Media type: Print (hardback & paperback)
- Pages: 215
- ISBN: 0-425-06250-3
- OCLC: 10019192
- Dewey Decimal: 813/.54 19
- LC Class: PS3572.A724 M5 1983

Millennium is a 1983 time travel science fiction novel by John Varley. Varley later turned this novel into the script for the 1989 film Millennium, both of which are based on Varley's short story "Air Raid", which was published in 1977.

The book was nominated for several science fiction awards.

== Plot description ==
Millennium features a civilization that has dubbed itself "The Last Age". Due to millennia of warfare of every type (nineteen nuclear wars alone), the Earth has been heavily polluted and humanity's gene pool irreparably damaged. They have thus embarked on a desperate plan; time travel into the past, collect healthy humans, and send them to an uncontaminated planet to rebuild civilization.

The time travelers can only take people that will have no further effect on the timeline: those who have vanished without a trace, or died without being observed; otherwise they would be changing the past, which risks a temporal paradox and perhaps even a catastrophic breakdown of the fabric of time. Though they collect everyone they can, they exert a great deal of effort on those destined to die in various disasters such as sinking ships and crashing airplanes (and once a century of Roman soldiers lost and dying in the North African desert). As such incidents leave no survivors to report interference and change the timeline, they can freely remove the living but soon-to-die victims, and replace them with convincing corpses they have manufactured in the future.

The novel deals with several of the raids, their eventual discovery in the present day, and the fallout that results from changes to the present day reverberating into the future.

The story follows Louise Baltimore, who is in charge of a "snatch team" that goes back into the past to kidnap people who would otherwise die. Because of the massive pollution and the genetic damage she has sustained, she is missing one leg and must get advanced medical treatment daily. Her natural appearance is quite ugly due to skin damage (from "paraleprosy") and other problems; however, she wears a special "skin suit" which makes her look whole and beautiful (which may or may not be real—she is an unreliable narrator), and gives her a functional artificial leg.

The team she leads uses a "time gate" to appear in the bathroom aboard an airplane in flight. Dressed to look like flight attendants, they begin to bluff the passengers into entering the bathroom where they are pushed into the gate, to arrive in the future. After large numbers of people disappear, the remaining passengers become suspicious. The future team then uses special weapons to stun them before throwing them through the gate.

During the removal of the passengers, they run into an unexpected hijacker. The ensuing gunplay is one-sided; one of the snatch team members is killed, and her stunner is lost. The rest of the team finishes removing the passengers and the real flight attendants. The team then scatters pre-burnt body parts around the plane so they will be found after the crash. As the plane approaches the moment when it is destined to crash, the lost weapon still has not been found.

Upon returning to her present (our future), Louise is informed that the weapon that was left behind has caused a paradox and that it must be recovered to prevent a breakdown in the fabric of time.

=== Chapter titles ===
Most of the novel's chapter titles are based on novels and short stories about time travel by other authors, as Varley mentions in the book's author's note: "The time-travel story has a long history in science fiction. The theme has been so extensively explored, in fact, that I found it no trouble to write a book with chapter titles borrowed almost exclusively from the long list of stories that served, in one way or another, as ancestors to this one."

== Reception ==
=== Reviews ===
Greg Costikyan reviewed Millennium in Ares Magazine #15 and commented that "Millennium is old-fashioned, seamless science fiction. One gets the feeling that all is done well, but most of it has been done before. Does this mean one shouldn't buy it? By no means. There is certainly little enough well-written old-fashioned science fiction being published."

Other reviews include:.

- Review by Faren Miller (1983) in Locus, #267 April 1983
- Review by Piotr Gociek (1997) in Talizman #2-3 1997, p. 115-116 (in Polish)
- Review by John W. Silbersack in Heavy Metal, May 1983
- Review by Bob Collins in Fantasy Newsletter, no. 60, June–July 1983
- Review by Gene DeWeese in Science Fiction Review, Fall 1983
- Review by Frank Catalano in Amazing Science Fiction, September 1983
- Review by Tom Easton in Analog Science Fiction/Science Fact, October 1983
- Review by Algis Budrys in The Magazine of Fantasy & Science Fiction, October 1983
- Review by Baird Searles in Isaac Asimov's Science Fiction Magazine, December 1983
- Review by Greg Costikyan in Ares, no. 15, Fall 1983
- Review by P. J. Thomas in Solaris, no. 55 (in French)
- Review by Pierre-Paul Durastanti in Fiction, no. 353 (in French)
- Review by Élisabeth Vonarburg in Solaris, no. 56 (in French)
- Review by David Pettus in Thrust, no. 20, Summer 1984
- Review by Jean-Marc Pradel in Proxima, no. 3 (in French)
- Review by Barbara Davies in Vector, no. 126
- Review by Martyn Taylor in Paperback Inferno, no. 54
- Review by Gene DeWeese in Science Fiction Review, Fall 1985
- Review by Darrell Bain in My 100 Most Readable (and Re-Readable) Science Fiction Novels (2005)
- Review by Eduardo Torres in Somnium, September 2007 (in Portuguese)

=== Awards and honors ===
The book was nominated for the Philip K. Dick Award in 1983, and for both the Hugo and Locus Awards in 1984.

== Film adaptation ==
Varley worked on numerous drafts of a screenplay for over ten years and half a dozen directors until it was finally filmed by Michael Anderson in 1989. As of December 2025, the film holds a 20% rating on review aggregator Rotten Tomatoes.
