= Millennium (film) =

1989 science fiction drama film by Michael Anderson

- Directed by: Michael Anderson
- Screenplay by: John Varley
- Based on: "Air Raid" by John Varley
- Produced by: John M. Eckert; Freddie Fields; John C. Foreman; Louis M. Silverstein
- Starring: Kris Kristofferson; Cheryl Ladd; Daniel J. Travanti
- Cinematography: Rene Ohashi
- Edited by: Ron Wisman
- Music by: Eric N. Robertson
- Production company: Gladden Entertainment
- Distributed by: 20th Century Fox
- Release date: August 25, 1989
- Running time: 108 minutes
- Country: United States
- Language: English
- Box office: $5.8 million

Millennium is a 1989 science fiction drama film directed by Michael Anderson and starring Kris Kristofferson, Cheryl Ladd, Robert Joy, Brent Carver, Al Waxman and Daniel J. Travanti.

The film follows an air crash investigator who discovers strange details while investigating a recent crash. A woman is sent back to his time from the future to try to derail his investigation before he uncovers their secret.

Millennium is based on the 1977 short story "Air Raid" by John Varley. Varley started work on a screenplay in 1979, and released the expanded story in book-length form in 1983 as Millennium.

== Plot ==
In 1989, while on its landing approach, a commercial airliner is about to be struck by another plane from above. The pilot struggles to control the plane while the flight engineer checks the passenger cabin. He returns to the cockpit yelling that everyone is dead and the corpses are burned.

National Transportation Safety Board investigator Bill Smith investigates the accident. He and his team are confused by the flight engineer's words on the cockpit voice recorder, as there is no evidence of a fire before the crash. Meanwhile, theoretical physicist Dr. Arnold Mayer is also curious about the crash, which borders on science fiction. In a lecture, he discusses the possibility of visits from time travelers.

About one thousand years into the future, pollution has rendered humans unable to reproduce. Teams are sent into the past to abduct people who are about to be killed, including the 1989 flight. The abductees are kept in stasis until they can be sent into the far future to repopulate the Earth. Most of the current population is in poor health but the time travelers—mostly women—are relatively healthy and are given the best food and care to pass for 20th-century humans. Present-day air is too clean for the time travelers to process; they smoke cigarettes to mimic their own timeline's atmosphere.

Every incursion into the past causes an accompanying "timequake", with a magnitude proportional to the incursion's effects. Time travelers try to minimize their effects by replacing the humans they abduct with organically grown copies. This explains the flight engineer's comment about the charred passengers; the replicas had been pre-burned in preparation for the crash.

In 1963, a time traveler on a plane is shot before it crashes, losing a stun weapon as a result. This weapon winds up in Dr. Mayer's possession, setting his path to investigate what is happening. Twenty-five years later, Smith finds a similar artifact among the wreckage of the crash portrayed at the beginning of the film.

Worried that the discoveries made by Smith and Mayer might change history, time-traveler Louise Baltimore is sent back to 1989 to deter Smith from pursuing his investigation. She gains Smith's trust and seduces him into a one-night stand, attempting to distract him. Smith gradually becomes suspicious and visits Dr. Mayer. Louise materializes from the future and reveals her mission to them, hoping they will voluntarily keep the secret. During the conversation, Mayer dies while reassembling the stun weapon.

Mayer was instrumental in the development of the Gate technology that made time travel possible; his death results in an unsolvable paradox—a force infinity timequake—which will destroy the entire civilization of the future timeline. The only course of action is to send all the people who were collected into the distant future before the Gate is permanently destroyed.

Bill and Louise, who is pregnant, step through the Gate together and disappear. As an explosion destroys the Gate and as the blast wave engulfs Louise's android advisor, Sherman, he quotes Winston Churchill: "This is not the end. This is not the beginning of the end. It is the end of the beginning."

== Cast ==
- Kris Kristofferson as Bill Smith
  - Jamie Shannon as Young Bill Smith
- Cheryl Ladd as Louise Baltimore
- Daniel J. Travanti as Dr. Arnold Mayer
- Robert Joy as Sherman The Robot
- Lloyd Bochner as Walters
- Brent Carver as Coventry
- David McIlwraith as Tom Stanley
- Maury Chaykin as Roger Keane
- Al Waxman as Dr. Brindle
- Lawrence Dane as Captain Vern Rockwell
- Thomas Hauff as First Officer Ron Kennedy

== Production ==
"We had the first meeting on Millennium in 1979. I ended up writing it six times. There were four different directors, and each time a new director came in I went over the whole thing with him and rewrote it. Each new director had his own ideas, and sometimes you'd gain something from that, but each time something's always lost in the process, so that by the time it went in front of the cameras, a lot of the vision was lost."

— Millennium writer John Varley.

Millennium took a decade to reach the screen. One director initially attached was visual effects designer Douglas Trumbull; Paul Newman and Jane Fonda were proposed to play the leads. MGM was attached to make the film; they also had Trumbull's Brainstorm in production at the time. The death of Brainstorm's leading lady Natalie Wood led to MGM briefly pulling the plug and thus halted production on Millennium due to Trumbull's involvement. The role of director then passed to Richard Rush, Alvin Rakoff, and Phillip Borsos, before Michael Anderson, best known for 1956's Oscar-winning Around the World in 80 Days, stepped in. Millennium's production designer, Gene Rudolf, had to produce a future setting that implied putrefaction and atrophy.

The largest set was the time-travel center for Louise Baltimore's operation. Rudolf created rusted catwalks that traversed a large open space. Buildings crumbled and exposed their infrastructures. The walls were painted dull green, black and coppery. Rudolf wanted the future to look dirty, sick and poisoned.

Several scenes are set in the vault for the decrepit council members overseeing the time travel operation. Rudolf designed their chamber as a semicircle of seven transparent, upright cylinders, each serving as a life-support device. Four of the cylinders held actors. The others were filled with bodily organ props and medical equipment that served as the last still living remnants of these members.

To create the time-travel effects of the Gate itself, cinematographer René Ohashi produced the ghostly shimmering lights by spinning metal wheels covered in Mylar.

Since actual aircraft could not be sent through the set, miniature models and a full-size mock-up of the tail-section of a Boeing 707 were used. Optical effects were used to make the planes look as if they were entering the set.

The penultimate scene took place in a contemporary American home. Rudolf's set was dominated by large horizontal windows. The room was filled with clocks, hourglasses and navigational equipment, in line with Dr. Mayer's fascination with time travel.

The scenes shot in the airport terminal buildings were actually shot at Toronto Lester B. Pearson International Airport, in the former Terminals 1 & 2. For the outdoor shot where Louise Baltimore steals the car, two-way traffic was run in front of the Terminal 2 arrivals level where it is ordinarily a one-way road.

Actor Scott Thompson played a bit part in the film, and discussed the experience in a sketch on The Kids in the Hall while in character as Buddy Cole.

== Reception ==
As of August 2025, the film holds a 20% rating on review aggregator Rotten Tomatoes from 10 reviews.

== Alternate endings ==
The original North American theatrical and VHS release of the film features a close-up of Sherman as the gate explodes, followed by a shot of the sun rising over clouds.

The International theatrical release features a much wider shot of the gate's explosion, followed by a wormhole/time portal effect. The scene then dissolves into an underwater shot of the two main characters swimming from above, followed by a view of the characters in a nude, Eden-esque embrace.

The 1999 North American DVD release contains the International version of the ending. The simpler North American version can also be found on the DVD as a bonus feature on the last page of the Production Notes; the version of the movie available on Netflix uses the North American ending as well.

== Home media ==
In February 2016, the film was released on Blu-ray by Shout! Factory in a double feature with R.O.T.O.R.
