= Overdrawn at the Memory Bank =

1984 TV film directed by Doug Williams

- VHS cover
- Genre: Science fiction
- Based on: "Overdrawn at the Memory Bank" by John Varley
- Teleplay by: Corinne Jacker
- Directed by: Douglas Williams
- Starring: Raul Julia; Linda Griffiths; Wanda Cannon; Donald C. Moore; Louis Negin; Chapelle Jaffe; Jackie Burroughs; Maury Chaykin
- Music by: John Tucker
- Countries of origin: Canada; United States
- Original language: English

Production
- Producers: Robert Lantos; Stephen J. Roth
- Cinematography: Barry Bergthorson
- Editor: Rit Wallis
- Running time: 84 minutes
- Production companies: WNET; RSL Films, Ltd

Original release
- Release: September 22, 1984

Overdrawn at the Memory Bank is a 1984 science fiction television film starring Raul Julia and Linda Griffiths. Based on the 1976 John Varley short story of the same name from the Eight Worlds series, the film takes place in a dystopian future where an employee at a conglomerate gets trapped inside the company's computer and ends up affecting the real world. It was co-produced by Canada's RSL Films, Ltd in Toronto and New York City television station WNET. Because of its limited budget, the motion picture was shot on videotape instead of film and was pre-sold to small American cable companies, as well as broadcast on PBS.

It premiered on CBC Television in 1984 and was later broadcast on American Playhouse in 1985. The film received mixed reviews from critics. Overdrawn at the Memory Bank was featured in the eighth season finale episode of the comedy television series Mystery Science Theater 3000 in 1997.

== Plot ==
In a future dystopia, Aram Fingal, a programmer working for the conglomerate Novicorp, is caught watching Casablanca at his workstation. As a consequence, the company assigns him mandatory prophylactic rehabilitation, where subjects are "doppeled" into wild animals to experience relaxation. Aram is sent into a baboon where he is monitored by controller Apollonia James. Aram begins to enjoy the experience until he is threatened by an elephant shaking the tree he is perched on. He activates an escape clause that is supposed to return his mind to his real body. However, during his doppel preparation, the routing tag on Aram's body was misplaced. When no one can locate his body, Aram's mind must be kept active by storing it in Novicorp's central computer, the HX368, which controls everything from finances to the weather. His mind can only be maintained in the computer for a limited time before it is destroyed.

Aram's disappearance is reported to a rival corporation. The news is broadcast worldwide, causing Novicorp's share price to crash. Majority shareholders force Novicorp's chairman to divert resources to keep Aram alive and find his body. Apollonia is assigned to locate his mind and keep him from hacking into Novicorp's mainframe. With Apollonia's help, Aram creates a virtual world where he encounters characters from Casablanca, including a version of Humphrey Bogart's character, Rick (played also by Julia). However, Aram quickly grows bored, and eventually plots a way to bring down Novicorp's finances without being removed and killed. Apollonia tries to keep him out of trouble, even placing herself in opposition to Novicorp's leaders. She eventually, despite the conflict of interest and initial friction with him, falls in love with Aram.

With Apollonia's help, Aram is finally able to "interface" with the mainframe and defeat his antagonists. He also returns to his body, which is discovered just before undergoing a sex change operation. Finally corporeal and reunited with his accomplice, Aram has taken complete control of the HX368. After ordering bonuses and stocks for every employee, committing Novicorp's chairman to a month of "compulsory rehab" via doppeling, and changing both his and Apollonia's identities to those of Rick and Ilsa from Casablanca, Aram vows to fight the dystopian government. The film ends with the new couple walking out the door and, now free from Novicorp's oppression, talking about opening a club on the other side of town: Rick's Place.

== Cast ==
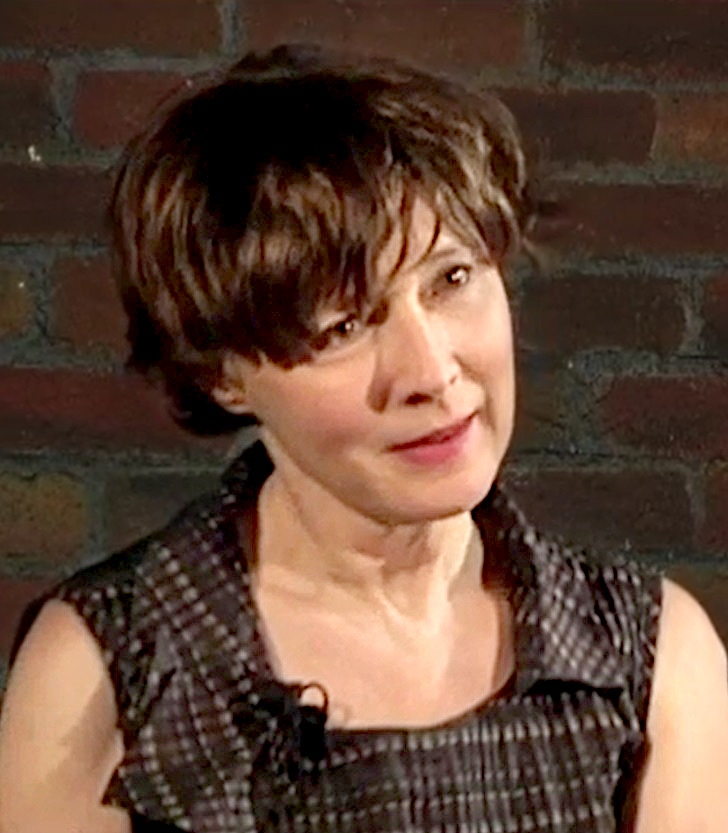
Linda Griffiths in 2013

- Raul Julia as Aram Fingal/Rick Blaine
- Linda Griffiths as Apollonia James
- Donald C. Moore as Novicorp Chairman/The Fat Man
- Wanda Cannon as Felicia Varley/Lola
- Helen Carscallen as Dr. Darwin
- Chapelle Jaffe as Djamilla
- Gary Farmer as Tooby
- Louis Negin as Pierre
- Maury Chaykin as Gondol

== Production and release ==
Overdrawn at the Memory Bank was co-produced by New York television station WNET and Toronto-based production company RSL Films, Ltd. It was shot at Magder Studios and on-location in Toronto from August 20 to September 12, 1983. Co-producer Robert Lantos said that the film's budget "exceeded well into seven figures". To cover some of the costs, it was pre-sold to small American cable companies. The film was shot on videotape, with Lantos claiming that if it had been shot on photographic film, it would have been as expensive as Blade Runner. Douglas Williams directed the film and Corinne Jacker wrote the film treatment.

The film premiered on CBC Television on September 22, 1984, later being shown on PBS's anthology series American Playhouse on February 4, 1985. It was broadcast in the United Kingdom on Channel 4 in June 1990. The film was released on VHS by New World Video and LaserDisc by Image Entertainment.

== Reception and legacy ==
Tom Brinkmoeller for The Cincinnati Enquirer called Overdrawn at the Memory Bank a "tongue-in-cheek and imaginative 90-minute delight". LA Weekly, acknowledging the low production values, praised the film for its ideas and the strong romantic relationship between Julia's and Griffiths' characters. The Washington Post's Sandy Rovner described the film as "certainly inoffensive, occasionally funny and altogether watchable". Jim Murphy from The Age considered the plot to be "quite tortuous" but thought it to be imaginative enough to sustain interest. In his book The Sci-Fi Movie Guide, Chris Barsanti found Overdrawn at the Memory Bank to be one of the better film translations of cyberpunk, despite being one of the least known. Barsanti also called the film a "fun lark" despite its confusing ending. In a negative review for Cinema Canada, Bruce Malloch remarked that, had it been released as a feature film rather than a direct-to-TV film, it would have been a failure. Malloch was critical of the film's plot and special effects, as well as its attempts to balance both drama and comedy. On the review aggregator website Rotten Tomatoes, 20% of 5 critics' reviews are positive.

=== Mystery Science Theater 3000 ===
Overdrawn at the Memory Bank was featured in the eighth-season finale episode of Mystery Science Theater 3000 (MST3K), a comedy television series in which the character Mike Nelson and his two robot friends Crow T. Robot and Tom Servo are forced to watch bad films as part of an ongoing scientific experiment. The episode was broadcast on the Sci-Fi Channel on December 6, 1997. MST3K cast member Bill Corbett disliked the film, calling it an "extraordinarily dumb movie whose relentless 'funny' techno-futuro-jargon was the screenwriting equivalent of water torture." Raul Julia had recently died, and the writers were wary of damaging his reputation. (Note: Julia died in 1994 of complications from a stroke, three years before the MST3K episode.) Fellow cast member and writer Paul Chaplin voiced his hatred towards Overdrawn, equating his disdain with later "experiment" Hobgoblins.

The episode was considered one of the best in the series, both by critics and by fans of the show. Jim Vorel for Paste ranked it as the 40th best in the series, (Note: Ranking based on 197 episodes as of 2018.) saying the film was ahead of its time and giving praise for the acting. Vorel was irritated by its soft focus appearance but overall considered it to be one of the most interesting films featured on MST3K. In a fan poll for the top 100 best episodes in the series, it ranked eleventh. Elliott Kalan, the head writer for the Netflix era of the series, considered it one of his favorite episodes in the series. In an article at Vulture, writer Courtney Enlow lists Overdrawn at the Memory Bank as one of the series' 25 essential episodes.

In 2003, Rhino Entertainment released the MST3K episode as part of the "Volume 4" DVD collection, along with episodes focused on Girl in Gold Boots (episode #1002), Hamlet (episode #1009), and Space Mutiny (episode #820).
