= John Varley (author) =

American science fiction author (1947–2025)

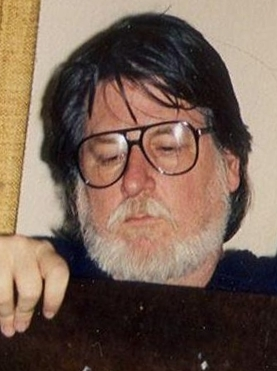
- Varley in 1992
- Born: John Herbert Varley; August 9, 1947; Austin, Texas, U.S.
- Died: December 10, 2025 (aged 78); Beaverton, Oregon, U.S.
- Education: Michigan State University
- Occupations: Novelist, short story writer
- Writing career
- Period: 1974–2018
- Genre: Science fiction
- Website: varley.net

John Herbert Varley (August 9, 1947 – December 10, 2025) was an American science fiction writer who won Hugo and Nebula awards for his novellas "The Persistence of Vision", "PRESS ENTER ■", and "The Pusher".

== Life and career ==
Varley was born in Austin, Texas, on August 9, 1947. He grew up in Fort Worth, moved to Port Arthur in 1957, graduated from Nederland High School—all in Texas—and went to Michigan State University on a National Merit Scholarship. He started as a physics major, switched to English, then left school before his 20th birthday and arrived in the Haight-Ashbury district of San Francisco just in time for the "Summer of Love" in 1967. There he worked at various unskilled jobs, depended on St. Anthony's Mission for meals, and panhandled outside the Cala Market on Stanyan Street (since closed) before deciding that writing had to be a better way to make a living. He was serendipitously present at Woodstock in 1969 when his car ran out of gas a half-mile away. He also lived at various times in Portland and Eugene, Oregon, New York City, San Francisco again, Berkeley, and Los Angeles.

He wrote several novels (his first attempt, Gas Giant, was, he admitted, "pretty bad") and numerous short stories, many of them in a future history, "The Eight Worlds". These stories are set a century or two after a race of mysterious and omnipotent aliens, the Invaders, have almost completely eradicated humans from the Earth (they regard whales and dolphins to be the superior Terran lifeforms and humans only a dangerous infestation). But humans have inhabited virtually every other corner of the Solar System, often through the use of biological modifications learned, in part, by eavesdropping on alien communications.

Varley's "Overdrawn at the Memory Bank" was adapted and televised for PBS in 1983. In addition, two of his short stories ("Options" and "Blue Champagne") were adapted into episodes of the short-lived 1998 Sci-Fi Channel TV series Welcome to Paradox.

Varley spent some years in Hollywood but the only tangible result of this stint was the film Millennium. Of his Millennium experience Varley said:

We had the first meeting on Millennium in 1979. I ended up writing it six times. There were four different directors, and each time a new director came in I went over the whole thing with him and rewrote it. Each new director had his own ideas, and sometimes you'd gain something from that, but each time something's always lost in the process, so that by the time it went in front of the cameras, a lot of the vision was lost.

Varley's work was compared to that of Robert A. Heinlein by the Canadian SF critic, editor, and author John Clute.

In 2021, Varley announced a series of health problems including a quadruple bypass, COVID-19, and bacterial pneumonia. Colleagues organized a crowdfunding campaign to pay his expenses while he was unable to write. At that time he described himself as living near Vancouver, Washington.

Varley died in Beaverton, Oregon, on December 10, 2025, at the age of 78.

== Bibliography ==
=== Novels ===
Year	Title	Series	Notes
1977	The Ophiuchi Hotline	Eight Worlds	Locus SF Award nominee, 1978
1979	Titan	Gaea Trilogy	Nebula Award nominee, 1979; Locus SF Award winner and Hugo nominee, 1980
1980	Wizard	Gaea Trilogy	Hugo and Locus SF Awards nominee, 1981
1983	Millennium		Philip K. Dick Award nominee, 1983; Hugo and Locus Awards nominee, 1984
1984	Demon	Gaea Trilogy	Locus SF Award nominee, 1985
1992	Steel Beach	Eight Worlds	Hugo and Locus SF Award nominee, 1993
1998	The Golden Globe	Eight Worlds	Prometheus Award winner, 1999; Locus SF Award nominee, 1999
2003	Red Thunder	Thunder and Lightning	Endeavour Award winner, 2004; Campbell Award nominee, 2004
2005	Mammoth		
2006	Red Lightning	Thunder and Lightning	
2008	Rolling Thunder	Thunder and Lightning	
2012	Slow Apocalypse		
2014	Dark Lightning	Thunder and Lightning	
2018	Irontown Blues	Eight Worlds	

=== Short story collections ===
- The Persistence of Vision (1978) (UK: In the Hall of the Martian Kings)
- The Barbie Murders (1980) (republished as Picnic on Nearside, 1984)
- Blue Champagne (1986)
- The John Varley Reader: Thirty Years of Short Fiction (2004)
- Good-bye, Robinson Crusoe and Other Stories (2013)

=== Other ===
- Millennium—screenplay (1989) based on the short story "Air Raid" (as was the novel Millennium)

== Awards ==
Varley won the Hugo Award three times:

- 1979: Novella—"The Persistence of Vision"
- 1982: Short Story—"The Pusher"
- 1985: Novella—"Press Enter■"

He was nominated a further twelve times.

Varley won the Nebula Award twice:

- 1979: Novella—"The Persistence of Vision"
- 1985: Novella—"Press Enter■"

He was nominated a further six times.

Varley won the Locus Award ten times:

- 1976: Special Locus Award—four novelettes in Top 10 ("Bagatelle", "Gotta Sing, Gotta Dance", "Overdrawn at the Memory Bank", "The Phantom of Kansas")
- 1979: Novelette—"The Barbie Murders"
- 1979: Novella—"The Persistence of Vision"
- 1979: Single Author Collection—The Persistence of Vision
- 1980: SF Novel—Titan
- 1981: Single Author Collection—The Barbie Murders
- 1982: Novella—"Blue Champagne"
- 1982: Short Story—"The Pusher"
- 1985: Novella—"Press Enter■"
- 1987: Collection—Blue Champagne

He also won the Jupiter Award, the Prix Tour-Apollo Award, several Seiun Awards, Endeavour Award, 2009 Robert A. Heinlein Award, and others.
