= The Barbie Murders =

Science fiction short story by John Varley

- Short story by John Varley
- First edition, Cover artist: David Plourde
- Language: English
- Genre: Science fiction

Publication
- Published in: IASFM
- Publication type: Magazine
- Publisher: Penny Publications
- Publication date: 1978
- Publication place: United States
- Media type: Print

The Barbie Murders is a science fiction short story by John Varley. It was first published in Asimov's Science Fiction in January/February 1978, and subsequently reprinted as the title story of Varley's 1980 collection of the same name, which was later reissued as Picnic on Nearside. Many of the stories take place in Varley's Eight Worlds setting.

== Plot summary ==
Lt. Anna-Louise Bach and her partner Jorge Weil are police officers in New Dresden, a domed city on the Moon. They are assigned what initially seems an open-and-shut case of murder, but are dismayed to realize that the crime took place in an area of the city inhabited by a cult called the Barbies. The Barbies have altered themselves into identical women under the order of their church's leader. They have had their genitals removed and have abandoned names and individual identities, save for tattooed ID numbers forced on them by law. All Barbies being identical, no identification of the murderer is possible.

The police discover that there have been not one, but several murders, all covered up by the Barbies until the last one, which was caught on security camera. The murderer repeats the crime in full view of the police, stabbing another victim before becoming lost in the crowd. The victim lives long enough to gasp out a number. The Barbie with that ID is arrested. A search of the room with that number also turns up some odd items, including a mask, a merkin, and makeup to alter her appearance. The arrested Barbie confesses to the crime and offers herself as a token guilty party. Bach reluctantly arrests her, but cannot accept the inevitable outcome, even though her superior officer approved the situation.

Bach decides to go undercover and has herself modified by a body sculptor so as to pass as a Barbie. She infiltrates the colony and locates the real murderer. The motive turns out to be one only possible for a religion based on being identical to one another. Bach is left with a recently murdered body that she passes off as the real culprit, intending to return to the colony surreptitiously to mete out justice herself.
