= Press Enter =

- Short story by John Varley
- Country: United States
- Language: English
- Genre: Science fiction

Publication
- Published in: Asimov's Science Fiction
- Publication date: May 1984

"Press Enter", often stylized PRESS ENTER ■, is a science fiction novella by American writer John Varley originally published in the May 1984 issue of Isaac Asimov's Science Fiction Magazine. In 1985 it won the Locus Award for Best Novella, Hugo Award for Best Novella and Nebula Award for Best Novella.

== Plot summary ==
Korean War veteran Victor Apfel discovers his neighbor, Charles Kluge, has died and bequeathed a significant inheritance to him. The Los Angeles Police Department is satisfied that Kluge has died by suicide, but a parallel investigation by Caltech computer expert Lisa Foo reveals that Kluge was hacking into dangerous, secretive government agencies that may have been involved in his death. Foo and Apfel become involved romantically as she follows Kluge's trail, exposing them to the same dangers.

== Awards ==
- 1987: Seiun Award – Foreign Short Fiction (Best Translated Short Story)
- 1985: Hugo Award – Novella
- 1985: Nebula Award – Novella
- 1985: Locus Award – Novella
- 1985: Science Fiction Chronicle Readers Poll – Novella

== Reception and analysis ==
N. Katherine Hayles noted the novella exhibited "a phobic reaction to the connection [between humans and a computer network] as an unbearable form of intimacy", with the precise moment of connecting being when Apfel first receives an automated phone call at the start of the story. Foo is more explicitly described as a cyborg, both for her breast implants (which she uses for mammary intercourse, calling the act "touring the silicone valley") and her computer expertise. Donna Haraway is displeased with the manner and violence with which one character is killed, calling it "excessive destruction".

The names of many of the characters are inside jokes based on the computer brands and culture at the time: "Victor Apfel" combines the German for Apple with either (or both) the VIC-20 and/or Victor Technology, a popular European computer manufacturer; Lisa was the predecessor of the Macintosh, Foo a programming term for an otherwise unidentified object, "Kluge" a term (usually kludge) for a cobbled-together system, and so on with several other names.
