= The Persistence of Vision (novella) =

Short story by John Varley 1978)

- Short story by John Varley
- Country: United States
- Language: English

Publication
- Published in: The Magazine of Fantasy and Science Fiction
- Publication date: 1978

"The Persistence of Vision" is a novella by American writer John Varley. It was included in the anthology of the same name and in The John Varley Reader.

== Plot summary ==
A hitchhiker discovers the town of Keller, a commune whose adult inhabitants are all deafblind. He gradually explores the increasingly sophisticated levels of communication the inhabitants of the town have created, eventually realizing that he will never be able to fully attain the highest levels of communication. Unable to cope with this reality, he leaves the commune for the increasingly decrepit outside world. On New Year's Eve of 2000, he decides to return to Keller, where he discovers the adults have all vanished through some uncommunicable means. The remaining children have blinded and deafened themselves to remove the obstacles to comprehension, and the narrator soon joins them.

== Reception ==
"The Persistence of Vision" won the Nebula Award for Best Novella of 1978, and the 1979 Hugo Award for Best Novella.

James Nicoll felt that, as the story was written by John Varley in the 1970s, it was "pretty much guaranteed to be well written and worth reading", and noted that its setting required "social despair".

In Science Fiction Studies, Clayton Koelb considered that the story's "principal theme" was the costs and rewards of escape from the world and the world's language into a language of pure presence".
