= King Roland =

King Roland could refer to the following:

== Characters ==
- King Roland, a character in Martha Wells' Ile-Rien series
- King Roland, a character in Spaceballs
- King Roland, a character in The Three Clever Kings
- King Roland Ironfist, a character in Might and Magic
- King Roland II, a character in Sofia the First

== People ==
- Roland of Galloway (died 1200), a Scottish "sub-king" for Galloway
- Roland (entertainer) (born 1992), a Japanese celebrity known as the "King of Hosts"

== See also ==
- All pages with titles containing "King" and "Roland"
- Roland (name)
- Roland (disambiguation)
