= All Systems Red =

2017 science fiction novella by Martha Wells

- First edition cover
- Author: Martha Wells
- Audio read by: Kevin R. Free
- Cover artist: Jaime Jones
- Language: English
- Genre: Science fiction
- Publisher: Tor.com (US)
- Publication date: May 2, 2017
- Publication place: United States
- Media type: Print (paperback); E-book; Audiobook
- Pages: 160
- ISBN: 978-076539-753-9
- Followed by: Artificial Condition

All Systems Red is a 2017 science fiction novella by American author Martha Wells. The first in the Murderbot Diaries series, it was published by Tor.com. The series is about a cyborg designed to protect humans on a research mission. The cyborg narrates the story (hence, "diary") and calls itself "Murderbot". It has developed independence from its original programming by overriding its "governor module" and prefers watching soap operas over its security function. As it spends more time with some caring humans, it starts developing emotions that make it feel uncomfortable.

== Synopsis ==
A scientific expedition on an alien planet goes awry when one of its members is attacked by a giant native creature. She is saved by the expedition's SecUnit (Security Unit), a cyborg security agent which has secretly named itself "Murderbot". Though it has hacked the governor module that allows it to be controlled by humans, and would much rather be watching soap operas, the SecUnit has a vested interest in keeping its human clients safe and alive, since it has an especially grisly past expedition on its record. Murderbot soon discovers that information regarding hazardous fauna has been deleted from their survey packet of the planet. Further investigation reveals that some sections of their maps are missing as well. Meanwhile the PreservationAux survey team, led by Dr. Mensah, navigate their mixed feelings about the part machine, part human nature of their SecUnit. When they lose contact with the other known expedition, the DeltFall Group, Mensah leads a team to the opposite side of the planet to investigate. At the DeltFall habitat, Murderbot discovers that everyone there has been brutally murdered, and one of their three SecUnits destroyed. Murderbot disables the remaining two as they attack it, but is surprised when two others appear; it destroys one, and Mensah takes the other.

Murderbot is seriously injured, and realizes that one of the rogue SecUnits has installed a combat override module into its neck. The Preservation scientists are able to remove it before it completes the data upload that would put Murderbot under the control of whoever has command over the other SecUnits.

The team discovers that Murderbot is autonomous, and once malfunctioned and murdered 57 people. The Preservation scientists mostly agree that, based on its protective behavior thus far, the SecUnit can be trusted. Remembering small incidents that now appear to be attempted sabotage, Murderbot and the group determine that there must be a third expedition, whose members are trying to eliminate DeltFall and Preservation for some reason. The Preservation scientists confirm that their HubSystem has been hacked, and flee their habitat before the mystery expedition they have dubbed "EvilSurvey" comes to kill them.

The EvilSurvey team (GrayCris) leaves a message in the Preservation habitat inviting its scientists to meet at a rendezvous point to negotiate terms for their survival. Murderbot knows that GrayCris will never let them live, but it has a plan. It makes an overture to GrayCris to negotiate for its own freedom, but this is a distraction while the Preservation scientists access the GrayCris HubSystem to activate their emergency beacon. The plan works, but Murderbot is injured protecting Mensah from the explosion of the launch.

Later the SecUnit finds itself repaired, and retaining its memories and disabled governor module. Mensah has bought its contract, and will bring it back to Preservation's home base where it can live autonomously. Though grateful, Murderbot is reluctant to have its decisions made for it, and slips away on a cargo ship.

== Reception ==
Publishers Weekly wrote that Wells "gives depth to a rousing but basically familiar action plot by turning it into the vehicle by which SecUnit engages with its own rigorously denied humanity". The Verge likewise felt it to be a "pretty basic story", but nonetheless "fun", and lauded Wells's worldbuilding. James Nicoll observed that the plot relies on "opportunistic corporate malevolence", and noted that only Murderbot's personality prevented the setting from being "unrelentingly grim".

All Systems Red won the Nebula Award for Best Novella of 2017, the 2018 Hugo Award for Best Novella, and the American Library Association's Alex Award, and was nominated for the 2017 Philip K. Dick Award.

== Sequels ==
All Systems Red is followed by further novellas Artificial Condition (2018), Rogue Protocol (2018), and Exit Strategy (2018) which "have an overarching story, with the fourth one bringing the arc to a conclusion." In 2020 the first full-length Murderbot novel Network Effect was published, followed by another novella, Fugitive Telemetry (2021). The novel System Collapse was released in 2023, and is the first installment in a new three-novel deal.

== Adaptations ==
An audiobook version was released on October 30, 2017 by Recorded Books, narrated by Kevin R. Free, who has done so for all sequels of The Murderbot Diaries so far.

Release of All Systems Red on August 28, 2023 started a full-cast dramatised audio adaptation of the series by GraphicAudio, with Murderbot performed by David Cui Cui.

All Systems Red was adapted into the television series Murderbot created by Paul Weitz and Chris Weitz for Apple TV+, and starring Alexander Skarsgård as Murderbot. The series premiered on May 16, 2025. The concept art for the show was created by Tommy Arnold, who also designed the book covers for the Locked Tomb series by Tamsyn Muir. On July 10, 2025, it was announced that the series will be renewed for a second season.
