= Witch King (novel) =

2023 fantasy novel by Martha Wells

- 1st ed. cover
- Author: Martha Wells
- Audio read by: Eric Mok
- Language: English
- Series: The Rising World #1
- Genre: Fantasy
- Publisher: Tor Books
- Publication date: May 30, 2023
- Publication place: United States
- Pages: 432 pp (hardcover 1st ed.)
- Awards: Dragon Award for Best Fantasy Novel (2023); Locus Award for Best Fantasy Novel (2024)
- ISBN: 9781250826794 (hardcover 1st ed.)
- OCLC: 1451712017
- Followed by: Queen Demon
- Website: Official website

Witch King is a 2023 fantasy novel by Martha Wells. It is the author's first fantasy novel in almost ten years, following the publication of her science fiction series The Murderbot Diaries. Its sequel, Queen Demon, was released in 2025.

It won the 2024 Locus Award for Best Fantasy Novel, and was also a finalist for the Hugo Award and Nebula Award.

== Plot ==
=== Premise ===
The story alternates between the past and the present; this plot summary is written in chronological order.

In the world of the story, demons come from the underearth. The nomadic people of the Saredi make a deal to allow demons into the overearth; the demons possess the bodies of recently deceased Saredi, becoming members of their extended families. Witches are born of the unions between mortals and demons.

=== The Past ===
Kai-Enna is a demon living among the Kentdessa Saredi clan. His cousin Adeni is killed by a monster, presaging an invasion by the Hierarchs. The Hierarchs' expositors, or magicians, close the gateway to the underearth and separate the demons from their home. The Hierarchs ally with the Immortal Blessed in order to capture and control most of the continent, killing millions. They take prisoners of war, including Kai, to their Summer Halls.

Kai is rescued by Bashasa Calis, a prisoner of war and prince-heir of the city-state Benais-arik. Bashasa leads a rebellion. He is assisted by the Witch Ziede; the Immortal Blessed warrior Tahren, who has chosen to turn against her people and the Hierarchs; and Tahren's brother Dahin. These fighters free the prisoners and kill a Hierarch in the first successful retaliation against the conquest. During this process, Kai steals the body of an expositor. This non-consensual possession is a great wrongdoing in the eyes of the other demons, including his cousin Arn-Nefa; the other demons disown him. Bashasa reclaims his throne in Benais-arik, leading to the founding of the Rising World coalition.

=== The Present ===
Kai wakes to find that he has been imprisoned. An expositor attempts to bind him as a familiar, but Kai kills him. During this process, Kai's consciousness jumps into a new body. He rescues his companion Ziede and a street urchin named Sanja. Ziede's wife Tahren is missing, and Kai suspects that Bashat bar Calis, current prince-heir of Benais-arik, is responsible.

They are pursued by expositors who are using a ship stolen from Immortal Blessed. Kai kills an expositor and takes over the ship with the help of his friends. Kai then enters the underearth to communicate with his demon-kin about events during his imprisonment. Kai speaks with Grandmother, the progenitor of his immortal line of demons. She suggests that Tahren may be hidden from Kai's view in a Witch cell, which obscures the occupant through a magic device called a cantrip.

Ramad, personal vanguard to Prince-heir Bashat, helps Kai. The prince of Nient-arik is implicated. This city-state wants to replace Benais-arik as the leader of the Rising World Coalition during the upcoming treaty renewal ceremony.

They travel to the ruins of the Hierarchs’ Summer Halls to look for a finding stone, which will help them locate Tahren. At the Halls, they find Dahin. Kai, Ziede and Dahin are attacked by Arnsterath (formerly Arn-Nefa), who is working with Immortal Blessed and the Nient-arik conspirators. Kai and Ziede emerge victorious with the finding stone.

It is revealed that Bashat knew about the Immortal Blessed and Nient-arik conspiracy. Bashat knew the plot to capture Kai would fail; he poisoned Kai, allowing Kai, Ziede, and Tahren to be captured. He then exposed the plot in order to strengthen his own city's position prior to the treaty renewal. Ramad has been his spy. Kai has simultaneously organized to weaken the international support of Benais-arik, causing the renewal to fail and the Rising World coalition to devolve into a set of allied states rather than an empire. Kai abandons Ramad. Kai and his remaining companions use the finding stone to locate Tahren. The remaining conspirators are captured and Ziede is reunited with her wife.

== Reception ==
Writing for The New York Times, author Amal El-Mohtar ranked Witch King as one of the top ten science fiction and fantasy novels of 2023. El-Mohtar wrote that the novel "is an immersive throwback to a beloved species of 1990s fantasy doorstop, full of cataclysmic intrigues between mostly immortal families". Alex Brown of Tor.com called the novel "challenging, immersive, and sprawling", praising the way in which queerness is normalized in the novel as well as Wells's "descriptions, both macro and micro." Brown notes that some readers may be disappointed that "Wells doesn’t tell the reader much about the history of the world or the specific events that bridge the gap between Kai’s time in the grasslands, the Hierarchs’ brutal rise and subsequent fall, and the rebuilding of the world left in their wake." However, Brown notes that "it doesn’t so much matter how they got to where they are; what’s important is how they plan to move forward."

Publishers Weekly wrote that "the dry, workmanlike prose that works so well when Wells is writing robots can make it difficult to feel particularly close to any of these living characters." Nevertheless, their review praised the treatment of gender and sexuality, as well as the way in which Wells depicts "the cultures of this world with an anthropologist’s care".

Writing for Locus, Adrienne Martini stated that "Wells introduces so many parts of Kai’s world so quickly that figuring out all of the players and how they relate to Kai’s story quickly becomes impossible, so much so that I really wondered if this was the second book in a series." Martini praised the "imaginative bits of scenery" and the relationships between the characters, but ultimately felt that the plot was too confusing. A review for Berkeley Fiction Review gave the novel 2.5 of 5 stars, noting that "the readers’ lack of knowledge about the world and Rising World politics makes the story cumbersome rather than engaging." The review criticized the dual-timeline structure, noting that "The Hierarchs are established as the Big Bad, but we enter the novel in the present day with the understanding that Kai has already defeated them—negating any tension involving the Hierarchs that Wells crafts in the past timeline". Finally, the review noted that the "queer relationships in this novel are more repressed than celebrated; despite being openly gay or lesbian, her characters aren’t ever given an opportunity to show their feelings openly on the page."

== Awards ==
Year	Award	Category	Result	Ref.
2023	Dragon Awards	Fantasy Novel	Won	
2023	Nebula Award	Novel	Nominated	
2024	Hugo Award	Novel	Finalist	
2024	Locus Award	Fantasy Novel	Won	
2024	World Fantasy Award	Novel	Nominated	

== External ==
- Official website
