= Characters from Ile-Rien =

This is a list of characters from the fictional nation of Ile-Rien, the setting of five of Martha Wells' fantasy novels.

== House Fontainon ==
The Fontainon dynasty is the ruling family of Ile-Rien, governing for the several centuries that comprise the time-span of the books.

=== King Fulstan ===
The deceased husband of Ravenna Fontainon, he was bestowed the rights and privileges of a regnant monarch by his father-in-law, the previous king. He is the father of Roland by his consort Ravenna, and the father of Kade Carrion by Moire (the Queen of Air and Darkness), a visiting dignitary to his court. He was notoriously petty and ineffectual, and was particularly cruel to his son, the future King Roland. Fulstan is deceased at the beginning of 'The Element of Fire.'

=== Queen Ravenna ===
The daughter of the previous Fontainon king, widow of King Fulstan, and doyenne of House Fontainon, she is the true ruler in Ile-Rien during the time of The Element of Fire. In her youth, she was an admired beauty with pale skin and reddish auburn hair. As dowager queen, she maintains her son Roland's reign, seeing to its stability. While queen consort, she was a dynamic leader in the war against the hostile Bisrans, often taking command in the field directly. Feared by her courtiers and ambassadors to her court, she is regarded as a brilliant and capable ruler. Her son Roland is a great disappointment to her, as is her lack of additional living children. Queen Ravenna's long-time lover, Thomas Boniface, is the captain of her squadron of dedicated arms-men, The Queen's Guard. In the later books, she is a celebrated national heroine, and has many monuments dedicated to her.

=== King Roland ===
The son of the late Fulstan and Ravenna, the scion of House Fontainon, King Roland is a weak king, prone to rash decision-making, and excessively vulnerable to flattery. His closest companion is Denzil, the Duke of Alsene, an ambitious kinsman who has designs upon the throne. Roland's wife is the foreign-born Falaise. The two are barely acquainted with one another, leading largely separate lives at court.

=== Queen Falaise ===
Roland's queen, she is the third daughter of nobles from neighboring Umberwald, and a princess in her own land. Originally a studious, pensive young woman, she was selected to be the future queen by Ravenna, who had hopes of molding her as a protégé, able to temper the excesses of Roland and provide wise counsel. As a young queen, she assembled a flattering entourage of poets and minstrels and had little interest in statecraft.

=== Kade Carrion ===
Also known as Princess Katherine Fontainon, she is the bastard daughter of King Fulstan and Moire, the Queen of Air and Darkness, a powerful fay ruler in her own lands. Half-human and half-fay, Kade is a talented natural sorceress, and was reared in the royal palace in Vienne until she inadvertently unleashed her magic in a most destructive manner. Neglected and abused by King Fulstan, she shared a bond with Roland, who also suffered at the hands of their father. Decidedly un-regal, she eschews the trappings of her royal station, much to the annoyance of Queen Ravenna. She is ultimately rejected from the royal palace and court life. At the beginning of The Element of Fire, she has assumed her mother's title and station.

=== The Queen in The Death of the Necromancer ===
A descendant of Queen Ravenna, she rules Ile-Rien during 'The Death of the Necromancer.' Her name has not been revealed. In that book, she is an unmarried young woman who "uses candor like a loaded pistol," and is sharp witted and observant. She suggests, only half-jestingly, that she marry Nicholas Valiarde for dynastic reasons.

In The Fall of Ile-Rien trilogy, the same, yet-unnamed, queen rules, and has evidently married. She is the mother of at least two children, Prince Ilaron and Princess Olympe.

As the invasion progresses, and the conquest of Vienne seems imminent, the queen makes arrangements to relocate the government and set up in exile in neighboring Parscia. Fearful of being able to safely make her escape, she separates the royal family, sending her children away via different routes, along with various government documents and items of regalia.

=== Prince Ilaron ===
The older child of the ruling queen in The Fall of Ile-Rien trilogy.

In The Ships of Air, it was revealed that the Queen, fearful of being able to escape to Parscia to establish a government-in-exile against the onslaught of the Gardier, separated the royal family. Prince Ilaron was sent away with trusted ministers to escape via the railroads. He is the Crown Prince of Ile-Rien.

=== Princess Olympe ===
The younger child of the ruling queen in The Fall of Ile-Rien trilogy.

In The Ships of Air, it was revealed that the Queen, fearful of being able to escape to Parscia to establish a government-in-exile against the onslaught of the Gardier, separated the royal family. Princess Olympe was sent with trusted ministers such as Count Delphane and Lady Aviler, her duenna, to escape aboard the Queen Ravenna. Included in the princess' baggage was King Fulstan's coronation crown, as well as the royal charter.

== The Queen's Guard ==
Originally a body of armsmen placed directly at the command of the Queen of Ile-Rien, they have a celebrated history of valor and courage. They are a different body than the Royal Guard, which serves at the direction of the King of Ile-Rien. They are headquartered within the royal palace in Vienne. At the beginning of The Element of Fire, they are both an elite armed force and the queen's personal bodyguard. In later books, they have developed into an intelligence gathering agency, as well as remaining the bodyguard of the queen and her chosen designees, often guarding them covertly.

=== Thomas Boniface ===
The captain of the Queen's Guard and one of the main characters in The Element of Fire. He was once Queen Ravenna's lover and remains a dedicated protector until the end of her life. At the end of the Element of Fire, he falls in love with the half-fey princess Kade Carrion.

== The Valiarde Family ==
A family of wealthy commoners descended from the exiled Duke of Alsene, Denzil. Their primary residence is the Coldcourt manor located outside of Vienne. They became known as eccentric scholars and art collectors.

=== Nicholas Valiarde ===
A descendant of the infamous traitor Denzil, Duke of Alsene, his mother Sylvaine Valiarde married into the Alsene family, only to ultimately reject her husband and flee with her infant son, Nicholas, to Vienne, the capital. They live in poverty until she dies, and then Nicholas moves out on the streets as the leader of a gang, until he gets caught. A natural philosopher and widower in need of an intelligent heir, Edouard Villier, takes him out of prison and raises him.

Nicholas ends up at Lodun, studying to become a doctor, until Edouard is arrested, tried, and eventually hung for necromancy, despite the fact that he wasn't even a sorcerer. Knowing that his foster father was innocent, Nicholas becomes obsessed with killing Count Rive Montesq, the man who framed Edouard.

Nicholas was raised under the surname 'Valiarde,' although his true lineage was no great secret. In Death of the Necromancer, he lives the life of a callow ne'er-do-well art collector, while living a daring double life as 'Donatien,' a mysterious master-thief bedevilling the mansions and galleries of Ile-Rien. His lover, later wife, was Madeline, a celebrated actress who also dabbled in his life of masquerades and thievery. While he was unmarried the Young Fontainon Queen only half-jestingly suggested that she may marry him, since he would be a fitting consort due to his once-regal bloodlines.

In the Fall of Ile-Rien trilogy, Nicholas has disappeared, leaving his daughter by Madeline, Tremaine, the sole possessor of Coldcourt. He is later revealed to be a spy against the Gardier.

=== Tremaine Valiarde ===
The sullen, moody yet highly intelligent daughter of Nicholas and Madeline, she is the main character in the Fall of Ile-Rien trilogy, as a researcher in a covert government project trying to unlock the secrets of Gardier weaponry. She is the sole possessor of Coldcourt, and the object of several unwelcome suitors.

Tremaine is able to use one of her Valiarde heirlooms, an Arisilde Sphere, to discern the origins of The Gardier and the nature of their magical weapons. She begins to travel between the world in which Ile-Rien is situated, the world of the Syprians, and the homeworld of the Gardier. She later takes refuge on the Queen Ravenna.
