= Noma Dumezweni =

South African–British actress (born 1969)

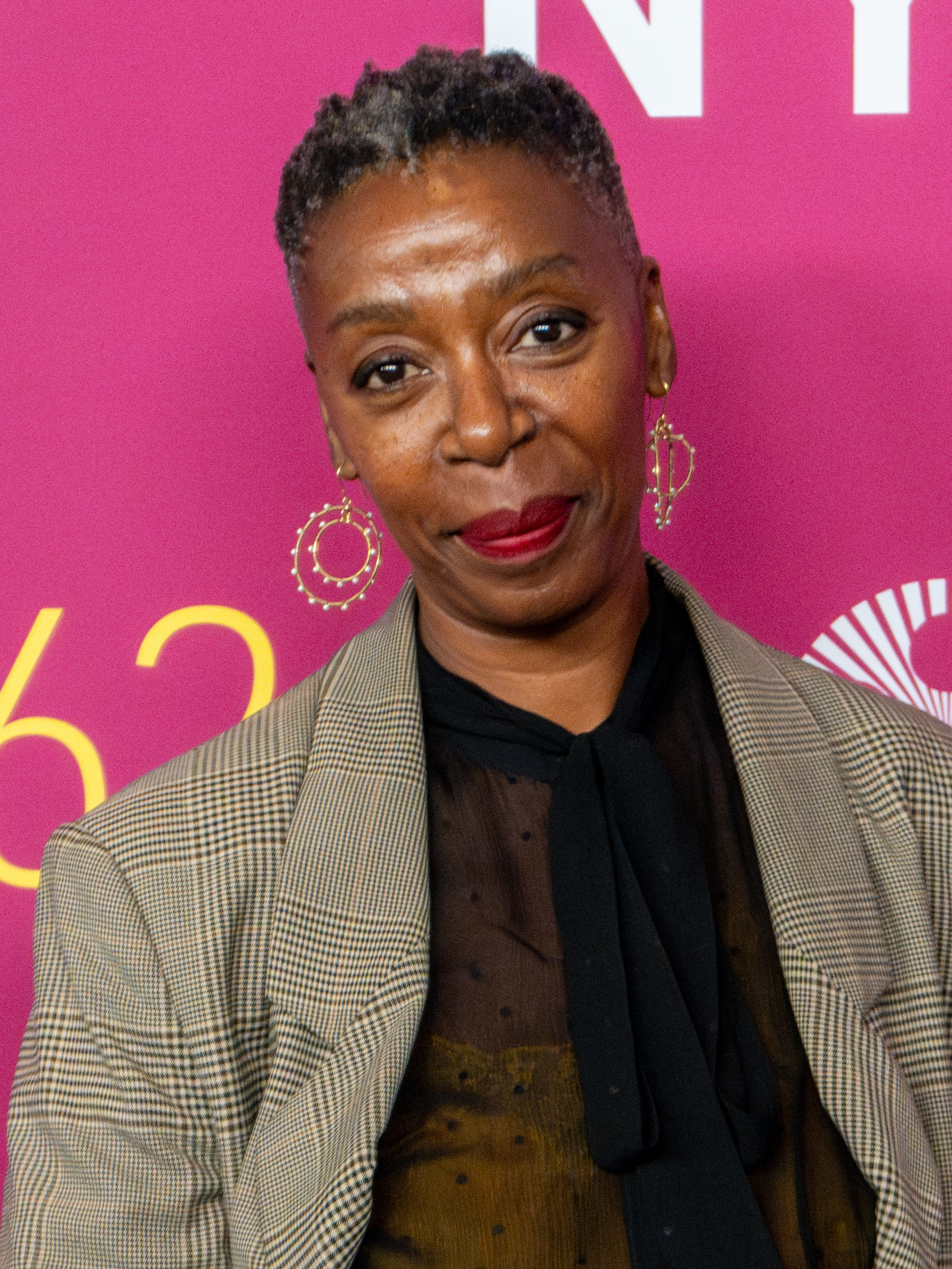
- Dumezweni in 2024
- Born: 1969 (age 56–57); Mbabane, Swaziland
- Occupation: Actress
- Years active: 1990s–present
- Notable credit: Hermione Granger in Harry Potter and the Cursed Child
- Children: 1
- Awards: Laurence Olivier Award

Noma Dumezweni (/ˈduːməˈzwɛniː/; born 1969) is a British actress. In 2006, she won the Laurence Olivier Award for Best Performance in a Supporting Role for her performance as Ruth Younger in A Raisin in the Sun at the Lyric Hammersmith Theatre. In 2017, she won the Laurence Olivier Award for Best Actress in a Supporting Role for her performance as Hermione Granger in the original West End run of Harry Potter and the Cursed Child; she reprised the role for the show's original Broadway run and, in 2018, was nominated for the Tony Award for Best Featured Actress in a Play. She is also known for her roles on television, including as Ayda Mensah in Murderbot, since 2025.

== Early life and education ==
Noma Dumezweni was born in Swaziland (present-day Eswatini), in 1969 to South African parents. She lived in Botswana, Kenya, and Uganda, before arriving in England as a refugee at the age of seven with her sister and mother.

She first lived in Felixstowe, Suffolk, where she was educated. before moving to London when she was 18 years old.

== Career ==
=== Theatre ===
==== Early work ====
Dumezweni's work in theatre includes: President of an Empty Room and The Hour We Knew Nothing of Each Other at the National Theatre, London; A Raisin in the Sun for the Young Vic at the Lyric Hammersmith, London (for which she won her first Laurence Olivier Award for Best Performance in a Supporting Role); A Midsummer Night's Dream, The Master and Margarita, Nathan the Wise and The Coffee House at Chichester Festival Theatre, Six Characters in Search of an Author in the Chichester Festival production at the Gielgud Theatre and The Bogus Woman at the Traverse and the Bush.

==== Royal Shakespeare Company ====
Dumezweni performed in the 2014 Macbeth with Anthony Sher as the First Witch. In 2002, she played Charmian in Antony and Cleopatra and Ursula in Much Ado About Nothing for the Royal Shakespeare Company (RSC). In 2006, she performed in Breakfast with Mugabe.

She returned to the RSC in 2009–11. In spring of 2009, she appeared in the RSC's The Winter's Tale. She also played Olyana in The Grainstone, Calphurnia in Julius Caesar, the Nurse in Romeo and Juliet, Morgan Le Fay in Le Morte d'Arthur, the Doctor in Little Eagles, and Alice in Adelaide Road.

==== Other theatres ====
In 2012, she played Rita in Belong at the Royal Court Theatre. In 2013, she played Mistress Quickly and Alice in Henry V starring Jude Law at the Noël Coward Theatre. At Royal Court, she played Mrs. Twit in The Twits, a stage adaptation of the story by Roald Dahl of the same name.

In 2013–2014, she appeared in A Human Being Died That Night at the Fugard Theater in Cape Town, the Market Theatre in Johannesburg, which later transferred to the Hampstead Theatre in London. In 2015, the show moved to Brooklyn Academy of Music (BAM) and she was lauded for her "impeccable performance". She starred in Linda at London's Royal Court Theatre in November 2015, stepping into the role vacated by Kim Cattrall with a few days' notice before press night. Awarding the production five stars, the Daily Telegraph's chief theatre critic Dominic Cavendish wrote: "If they can bottle and mass-produce whatever it is that Noma Dumezweni has got then, please, I want to order a life-time's supply." In 2014, she played Hippolita in 'Tis Pity She's A Whore at the Sam Wanamaker Playhouse. In 2015, she played Don José in Carmen Disruption, an adaptation of Georges Bizet's Carmen.

In December 2015, it was announced that Dumezweni had been cast as Hermione Granger in Harry Potter and the Cursed Child. On the announcement, theatre critic Kate Maltby described her as "an actress who consistently engages and enthrals." The casting of the black Dumezweni as Hermione sparked fervent discussion, to which J. K. Rowling responded that Hermione's skin was never specified as white. In 2017, Dumezweni won her second Laurence Olivier Award for Best Performance in a Supporting Role. Because of her performance in the role, Dumezweni was listed as one of BBC's 100 women during 2018. She reprised her role on Broadway at the Lyric Theatre in 2018.

In 2022, she played Nora Helmer in Lucas Hnath's A Doll's House, Part 2.

=== Television ===
Dumezweni appeared on numerous television shows, and in 2018, she starred in Black Earth Rising, the Hugo Blick drama about the prosecution of war criminals. She played the marine biologist Fiffany in the HBO Max comedy series Made for Love (2021–2022).

In 2008, Dumezweni appeared in the Doctor Who episode Turn Left as UNIT Captain Erisa Magumbo. She would then reprise the role a year later in the special episode Planet of the Dead. 2021 marked her return to the world of Doctor Who voicing the character of Rodekka in The First Son for Big Finish Productions.

In 2020, she appeared in the HBO series The Undoing alongside Nicole Kidman, Hugh Grant, and Donald Sutherland. The series received several nominations at the Golden Globes and Emmy Awards. Dumezweni plays Haley Fitzgerald, a powerhouse attorney hired by a wealthy New York psychotherapist (Kidman) to represent her husband (Grant), a pediatric cancer doctor who has been charged with the brutal killing of his mistress. This role enabled Dumezweni to reach an American audience thanks to the success of the series.

In 2022, Dumezweni appeared in the Netflix series The Watcher as Theodora Birch, the private investigator hired by the Brannock family. In 2025 she played the role of Mensah in the television adaptation of Martha Wells' science fiction series The Murderbot Diaries on Apple TV+. It was announced in July that the series would be renewed for a second season.

=== Film ===
Dumezweni has had several roles in feature films, including Miss Penny Farthing in Disney’s Mary Poppins Returns in 2018. In 2019, she played Edith Sikelo in The Boy Who Harnessed the Wind, directed by and starring Chiwetel Ejiofor. She played Dionne Davis in Peter Hedges' large ensemble drama The Same Storm and critic Stephen Farber wrote, her "powerhouse performance strikes the right mournful but modestly hopeful note as we exit the theater." She was in Disney's live-action adaptation of The Little Mermaid as Queen Selina, the adoptive mother of Prince Eric (Jonah Hauer-King) and a new character created for the film, and joined Liam Neeson in the cast of the film Retribution.

== Acting credits ==
=== Film ===
Year	Title	Role	Notes
2002	Dirty Pretty Things	Celia	
2018	Mary Poppins Returns	Miss Penny Farthing	
2019	The Kid Who Would Be King	Mrs. Lee	
2019	The Boy Who Harnessed the Wind	Edith Sikelo	
2021	The Same Storm	Dionne Davis	
2023	The Little Mermaid	Queen Selina	
2023	Retribution	Angela Brickman	
2024	The Friend	Barbara	
2026	Prima Facie	June	

=== Television ===
Year	Title	Role	Notes
2003	Holby City	Hannah Keelan	1 episode
2005	Silent Witness	DS Erin Jacobs	1 episode
2005	The Bill	Building Society Manager	1 episode
2006	Mysterious Creatures	Chanelle Pinkerton	Television film
2006	Holby City	Hesta Mukaka	1 episode
2006	After Thomas	Paula Murray	Television film
2007	Shameless	Mrs. Newman	1 episode
2007	Fallen Angel	Carla	1 episode
2007	New Tricks	Sophie Oyekambi	1 episode
2007	EastEnders	D.C. Wright	1 episode
2008	The Last Enemy	Valerie	1 episode
2008	Terry Pratchett's The Colour of Magic	Marchessa	Television film
2008	Fallout	Joyce Abena	Television film
2008–2009	Doctor Who	Captain Erisa Magambo	2 episodes
2012	Casualty	Marsha Chilcot	2 episodes
2013	Frankie	Angie Rascoe	6 episodes
2015	Midsomer Murders	Ailsa Probert	1 episode
2015	Capital	Greaves	2 episodes
2015	Casualty	Susan Blossom	1 episode
2017	Philip K. Dick's Electric Dreams	Senior Agent Okhile	1 episode
2018	Black Earth Rising	Alice Munezero	Main role, 7 episodes
2020	Normal People	Gillian	1 episode
2020	The Undoing	Haley Fitzgerald	Miniseries, 4 episodes
2021	Nature	Narrator	1 episode
2021	Pose	Tasha Jackson	1 episode
2021–2022	Made for Love	Dr. Fiffany Hodeck	Main role
2022	The Watcher	Theodora Birch	Main role
2023	Best Interests	Dr. Samantha Woodford	3 episodes
2023	Only Murders in the Building	Maxine	2 episodes
2024	Presumed Innocent	Judge Lyttle	6 episodes
2025–present	Murderbot	Ayda Mensah	Main role
2025	Law & Order: Special Victims Unit	Chief Kathryn Tynan	Recurring role

=== Stage ===
Year	Title	Role	Theatre
2002	Antony and Cleopatra	Charmian	Theatre Royal Haymarket
2008	The Hour We Knew Nothing of Each Other		Royal National Theatre
2014	Henry V	Mistress Quickly/Alice	Noël Coward Theatre
2016–2018	Harry Potter and the Cursed Child	Hermione Granger	Palace Theatre
2016–2018	Harry Potter and the Cursed Child	Hermione Granger	Lyric Theatre
2022	A Doll's House, Part 2	Nora Helmer	Donmar Warehouse

=== Radio ===
In radio, she has appeared in Jambula Tree, Seven Wonders of the Divided World, From Fact to Fiction, From Freedom to the Future, Handprint, Jane's Story, Sagila, Shylock, The Farming of Bones, The No. 1 Ladies Detective Agency, The Seven Ages of Car, The Bogus Woman and Breakfast with Mugabe.

She voiced various roles in the BBC Radio 4 dramatic recordings of Ursula K. Le Guin's Earthsea and The Left Hand of Darkness. From 2004 to 2014, Dumezweni intermittently voiced characters for the long-running BBC Radio 4 The No. 1 Ladies' Detective Agency.

=== Audiobooks ===
She voiced the young adult adventure series Steeplejack by A. J. Hartley, which is set in an imaginary world loosely resembling Victorian South Africa.

== Awards and nominations ==
Year	Award	Category	Work	Result	Ref.
2006	Laurence Olivier Award	Best Performance in a Supporting Role in a Play	A Raisin in the Sun (as Ruth Younger)	Won	.
2016	Evening Standard Theatre Award	Best Actress in a Leading Role	Linda	Nominated	
2017	Laurence Olivier Award	Best Actress in a Supporting Role in a Play	Harry Potter and the Cursed Child	Won	
2018	Tony Award	Best Actress in a Featured Role in a Play	Harry Potter and the Cursed Child	Nominated	
2018	Drama League Award	Distinguished Performance	Harry Potter and the Cursed Child	Nominated	
2018	Theatre World Award	—N/a	Harry Potter and the Cursed Child	Honouree	
2021	International Online Cinema Awards	Best Guest Actress in a Drama Series	Pose	Won	
2021	Satellite Awards	Best Supporting Actress – Series, Miniseries or Television Film	The Undoing	Nominated	

== See also ==
- List of British actors
