= Wheel of the Infinite =

2000 fantasy novel by Martha Wells

- Author: Martha Wells
- Language: English
- Genre: Fantasy
- Publisher: Eos Press
- Publication date: 2000
- Publication place: United States of America
- Media type: Print
- Pages: 400 (Hardcover)
- ISBN: 978-0-380-78815-6

Wheel of the Infinite is a 2000 fantasy novel by Martha Wells. It was first published by Eos/HarperCollins.

== Plot ==
The novel tells about the Wheel of the Infinite: a wheel that sets reality in check. The wheel is renewed every year but this year something goes wrong. The wheel shows a sign of darkness. The high priest the Celestial One summons Maskelle, an exile, to help investigate the cause of the looming darkness.
