= Queen Demon =

2025 fantasy novel by Martha Wells

- Author: Martha Wells
- Audio read by: Eric Mok
- Language: English
- Series: The Rising World #2
- Genre: Fantasy
- Publisher: Tor Books
- Publication date: 7 October 2025
- Publication place: United States
- Pages: 400 (hardcover)
- ISBN: 9781250826916
- Preceded by: Witch King

Queen Demon is a 2025 fantasy novel by Martha Wells. It is the second book in her Rising World series, following Witch King (2023).

== Plot ==
The story alternates between the past and the present; this plot summary is written in chronological order.

=== The Past ===
Following their victory at the Summer Halls, Kai and Bashasa recapture the city of Benais-arik. They raise an army from the Arike people and go to war against the invading Hierarchs. Unable to hold the city with a small number of warriors, Bashasa leaves Benais-arik and begins a guerrilla campaign against the Hierarchs.

Witches attack Bashasa's camp. Kai captures a dustwitch, who states that her tribe is led by a Witch called the Doyen. Kai attempts to negotiate with the dustwitches on behalf of Bashasa, but they rebuff the offer of an alliance. Kai and his companions rescue a group of prisoners from the dustwitches’ camp. A Witch named Nightjar rebels against the Doyen and kills her. The surviving Witches agree to join Bashasa. After Nightjar attempts to poison Kai, he exiles her from the camp.

The Arike forces plan an attack on Dashar, a fort currently controlled by the Hierarchs’ forces. With the help of the dustwitches and Dahin, Kai captures the fort.

=== The Present ===
Kai and his companions go to Benais-arik, where Tahren addresses the Rising World coalition regarding the recent conspiracy. Dahin gives Kai a manuscript which contains theories about the origin of the Hierarchs.

Despite his failed attempt to become Emperor, Bashat remains a member of the Rising World Council. Kai infiltrates the bar Calis family archives, where he encounters Bashat for the first time since the conspiracy failed. Kai promises to keep Bashat's role in the conspiracy secret. He then gives Dahin information retrieved from the archives.

Dahin asks Kai, Ziede, and Tahren to accompany him to the city of Belith. They also take the Witch Tenes and Sanja, a former street urchin. Dahin fears that the Well of the Hierarchs, the source of their power, has survived. It could be used to create more Hierarchs, restarting another cycle of war. In Belith, Kai discusses recent events with the Tescai-Lin, leader of the Enalin people. The Tescai-Lin informs Kai's group that an expedition to Sun-Ar has discovered artifacts relating to the expositors and Hierarchs.

Ramad arrives in Belith, serving as a representative from the Rising World Council. With him is his captive, Arnsterath. Dahin flees through a portal, transporting himself from Belith to the expedition camp. Kai confronts Dahin, who refuses to reveal any reasons for his erratic behavior. Kai and his companions find a tor which covers an underground chamber. Kai enters the tor and encounters the Hierarchs’ Well. He rescues several human scholars and Ilhanrun Highsun, an Immortal Blessed. They flee outside just as a Hierarch activates the Well, knocking Kai unconscious.

Kai is rescued by Arnsterath. Dahin finally reveals the reason he wanted to find the Well. Magical Wells can be powered by different forces; the Hierarchs’ Well is powered by death magic. The entry of an Immortal Blessed or a demon into a death Well destroys both the individual and the Well itself. Dahin planned to sacrifice himself to prevent the Hierarchs’ return.

Kai and his companions break into the tor, where they encounter the surviving Hierarch. Highsun collapses part of the tor, killing the Hierarch and almost killing Kai. Highsun uses the Well to transform himself into a Hierarch. He kills Tenes. Arnsterath throws herself into the Well, sacrificing herself to destroy it. Highsun loses his Hierarch powers and flees. Tenes's eyes open, revealing that she is now a demon. Arnsterath's spirit has survived by taking control of the body.

== Reception and awards ==
Marlene Harris of Library Journal commented on the story's structure, stating that the "past timeline shows heartbreak and triumph going hand in hand, while in the present, catastrophe and despair run headlong toward a likely shattered future..." Harris praised the novel as an "epic fantasy adventure of found family, lost love, and promises kept..." The review concluded that the novel would "keep readers on the edge of their seats... with its high-stakes adventures."

Liz Bourke of Locus called the book "every bit as good, and as complex, and as layered as its predecessor." Bourke praised the way in which Wells uses classic fantasy tropes. Queen Demon explicitly contrasts with against many fantasy novels, which portray evil as "extrinsic to people, a corruption that arises separate from their choices." Wells instead argues that evil is the result of "a whole series of choices, personal choices but also social choices of what to build and what to tear down, what to support, and when." Bourke's review concludes that "Queen Demon is a powerful work of art. I’ll be thinking about it for a long time to come."

A review in AudioFile praised the narration by Eric Mok. The review stated that "close listening" was required to keep the past and present timelines straight, but that Mok made each character's voice "instantly recognizable." The review concluded that the novel is "a sweeping, immersive story full of fascinating details and studded with small, intimate, moving moments between characters we come to care deeply about."

A review in Booklist praised the character development in the "past" arc, but felt that it was "auxiliary" to the present-day story. The review recommended the book for fans of character-driven fantasy novels.

The novel was a finalist for the 2026 Locus Award for Best Fantasy Novel.
