= Murderbot (TV series) =

American television series

- Genre: Action comedy; Science fiction
- Created by: Paul Weitz; Chris Weitz
- Based on: The Murderbot Diaries by Martha Wells
- Starring: Alexander Skarsgård; Noma Dumezweni; David Dastmalchian; Sabrina Wu; Akshay Khanna; Tamara Podemski; Tattiawna Jones
- Country of origin: United States
- Original language: English
- No. of seasons: 1
- No. of episodes: 10

Production
- Executive producers: Chris Weitz; Paul Weitz; Alexander Skarsgård; Andrew Miano; David S. Goyer; Keith Levine
- Running time: 22–34 minutes
- Production companies: Depth of Field Productions; Phantom Four Films; Paramount Television Studios

Original release
- Network: Apple TV+
- Release: May 16, 2025 – present
- Network: Apple TV

Murderbot is an American science fiction action comedy television series created by Paul Weitz and Chris Weitz for Apple TV. It is based on All Systems Red, the first book of the series The Murderbot Diaries by Martha Wells, who serves as a consulting producer. The series stars Alexander Skarsgård as the titular character. The first season premiered on May 16, 2025, and received positive reviews. In July 2025, the series was renewed for a second season.

== Premise ==
A media-obsessed private security construct (manufactured from cloned human tissue and mechanical parts) calling itself Murderbot must hide its newly acquired autonomy while completing dangerous assignments and being simultaneously drawn to humans, and appalled by their weaknesses.

== Cast and characters ==
=== Main ===
- Alexander Skarsgård as Murderbot
- Noma Dumezweni as Ayda Mensah, a terraforming specialist, the President of Preservation Alliance and the leader of the science team protected by Murderbot
- David Dastmalchian as Gurathin, a tech expert and augmented human
- Sabrina Wu as Pin-Lee, a scientist and legal counsel to the team
- Akshay Khanna as Ratthi, a wormhole expert
- Tamara Podemski as Bharadwaj, a geochemist
- Tattiawna Jones as Arada, a biologist

=== Recurring ===
Cast of show-within-a-show The Rise and Fall of Sanctuary Moon

- John Cho as Eknie Jef Chem (playing Captain Hossein)
- Jack McBrayer as Breiller MocJac (playing Navigation Officer Hordööp-Sklanch)
- Clark Gregg as Arletty (playing Lieutenant Kullervv)
- DeWanda Wise as Pordron Bretney III Roche (playing NawBot 337 Alt 66) (Note: Spelling as displayed in the work. The character is referred to as a "Navigation Unit" and a "Nav Bot".)

=== Guest ===
- Anna Konkle as Leebeebee, a member of another survey team on the planet. The character does not appear in the novella.
- Amanda Brugel as GrayCris Blue Leader
- David Reale as GrayCris Yellow

== Episodes ==
No.	Title	Directed by	Written by	Original release date
1	"FreeCommerce"	Paul Weitz	Teleplay by : Paul Weitz & Chris Weitz	May 16, 2025
A private security construct, annoyed by humans, hacks the governor module that forces it to obey their commands. Hiding its new autonomy to avoid being destroyed, the SecUnit renames itself Murderbot on a whim. A team of researchers is compelled to accept Murderbot on their mission to meet their insurance requirements but hesitate as it seems akin to slavery. On the planet, Murderbot enjoys watching reruns of television, especially a soap opera The Rise and Fall of Sanctuary Moon. Two researchers, Bharadwaj and Arada, come under attack from a massive centipede-like creature, but are saved by Murderbot. Bharadwaj is seriously injured, and Arada goes into shock. While bringing them back to the habitat, Murderbot lowers its mask to reveal a human face, and comforts Arada. After returning to the habitat, the augmented human Gurathin is suspicious of this behavior, as well as other clues that Murderbot is not acting as a SecUnit should. The team realizes there are unexplained gaps in the planetary maps and data provided to them and Murderbot reassures the crew it has no knowledge of why.
2	"Eye Contact"	Chris Weitz	Chris Weitz & Paul Weitz	May 16, 2025
Suspicious of Murderbot, Gurathin convinces Mensah not to bring the SecUnit along when she investigates a distant, unmapped location. Mensah becomes disoriented while out in the field, as another of the same species of creatures that attacked the others bears down on her. It moves past her drawn to a spot full of dead creatures, killed by ancient alien remnants. Back at the habitat, Murderbot, uncomfortable with conversation and eye contact, is asked by Gurathin to explain if it is acting outside the boundaries of its programme. Gurathin becomes concerned that it has some deleted memories.
3	"Risk Assessment"	Toa Fraser	Paul Weitz & Chris Weitz	May 23, 2025
Looking for answers about the missing maps and the ancient, alien technology the crew attempt to call the other research crew on the opposite side of the planet, but get no response and decide to go and investigate. Gurathin and Bharadwaj remain behind while the rest of the crew travels. At the other habitat, Murderbot distributes weapons and takes the lead into the investigation. Murderbot walks in alone, and finds its inhabitants dead and other SecUnits destroyed. It lies to its crew and says that everything is fine. Murderbot is attacked by another SecUnit and defeats it, before another SecUnit comes up behind it.
4	"Escape Velocity Protocol"	Toa Fraser	Chris Weitz & Paul Weitz	May 30, 2025
Murderbot discovers itself helpless and hallucinating about Sanctuary Moon while being dragged by a hostile SecUnit. After a fight, the hostile SecUnit installs a combat override module into Murderbot. Mensah comes to rescue it, and the other members of the team come to rescue Mensah. Although the hostile SecUnit is defeated by the crew using the hopper as a weapon, Murderbot tells the crew that it has been subverted by the combat override module and will kill them unless they kill it first. When they fail to act, Murderbot takes a gun from Mensah and shoots itself.
5	"Rogue War Tracker Infinite"	Paul Weitz	Paul Weitz & Chris Weitz	June 6, 2025
Mensah decides to take Murderbot back to their habitat, when Leebeebee, a surviving member of the DeltFall expedition, appears. She confirms that her teammates were killed by seemingly rogue SecUnits. The Preservation team brings her back to their base camp, where they repair and reboot Murderbot. Gurathin, who is still suspicious of the SecUnit, discovers that it has hacked its governor module even before they contracted it, but Mensah decides to trust Murderbot because of its actions to protect the team. After all that happened, they conclude that there must be an unknown hostile third party on the planet. They agree to activate the emergency beacon, which fails. When Mensah and Murderbot fly to the beacon to start it manually, it explodes.
6	"Command Feed"	Aurora Guerrero	Chris Weitz & Paul Weitz	June 13, 2025
Murderbot and Mensah survive the explosion, but the hopper is damaged and Murderbot had deleted the repair manual to make space for a season of Sanctuary Moon. When Mensah has a panic attack due to this, Murderbot calms her down by showing her an episode of the show. They manage to repair the hopper using neural fibers from Murderbot's spinal cord. At the habitat, Leebeebee tries to get more information about the results of the Preservation survey. When Gurathin refuses to show her the data, she produces a gun, shoots him in the knee and threatens the rest of the team. She admits that she is not a member of DeltFall, but of the third party. Murderbot returns and kills Leebeebee immediately, which leaves the Preservation team in shock. While it gets repaired, Murderbot muses that the others had assumed that it was becoming like them, and that it actually felt good to execute Leebeebee.
7	"Complementary Species"	Roseanne Liang	Paul Weitz & Chris Weitz	June 20, 2025
In a flashback, it is revealed that Gurathin used to be a spy working for the Corporation Rim and was suicidal before he met Mensah. The PresAux team prepares to evacuate the habitat, before the hostile third party arrives. Murderbot observes that Gurathin's body temperature is rising. They still take the hopper and try to hide. While the team discusses their situation, two of the centipede-like creatures appear and mate, leaving their eggs attached to the hopper. Shortly after that, a SecUnit of superior make attacks. The team unavailingly tries to help Murderbot fight the aggressor. When it accidentally destroys some of the alien eggs, the creature returns, bites the SecUnit's head off, collects the remaining egg sacks, and disappears. Gurathin collapses due to his infected wound. Against Murderbot's advice, Mensah orders to take him back to the medical bay of the habitat.
8	"Foreign Object"	Aurora Guerrero	Chris Weitz & Paul Weitz	June 27, 2025
Murderbot accompanies the PresAux team back to the habitat. The recording of the security cameras shows that in their absence, more superior SecUnits and a representative of the hostile third party—now identified as GrayCris—visited the habitat and left an invitation to meet at a rendezvous point to negotiate terms for their survival. After a security check, the PresAux team take Gurathin to the medical bay. While Bharadwaj performs surgery on Gurathin's leg, Murderbot plugs into his data port to turn off his sense of pain. The connection allows Gurathin to find out what Murderbot calls itself and that it was involved in the deaths of 57 clients, which Gurathin reveals to the group and condemns Murderbot for. Murderbot admits it is not sure if it killed the clients or not and agrees with Gurathin's assessment that it could be defective and dangerous, then it leaves the group to go out on its own. The PresAux team concludes that GrayCris is illegally after the alien remnants and that they will liquidate them once they find out their location. After mulling over whether to abandon or betray its clients, Murderbot comes back and announces that it has a plan.
9	"All Systems Red"	Roseanne Liang	Paul Weitz & Chris Weitz	July 4, 2025
Murderbot puts a dangerous plan into motion, pretending to betray the PresAux team to leave the planet. While the team expresses doubts and tension rises, Murderbot keeps the true plan hidden, which is to have Gurathin hack into GrayCris's HubSystem using a drone as a transponder and launch their emergency beacon. The ruse includes offering to help GrayCris capture the Preservation team in exchange for being listed as destroyed inventory. Murderbot stalls the enemy using awkward small talk and quotes from Sanctuary Moon, while the PresAux team manages the remote connection. As the plan begins to succeed, GrayCris prepares to torture Murderbot for the information they seek. Mensah intervenes and is caught in the crossfire. In the end, Murderbot shields her from the beacon's launch blast, which kills the GrayCris team, nearly sacrificing itself. Before Murderbot's systems fail, it quietly admits to itself that these humans have become its clients not just by contract but by choice.
10	"The Perimeter"	Paul Weitz	Chris Weitz & Paul Weitz	July 11, 2025
As Murderbot's systems reboot, company technicians delete its memory and install a new governor module. The PresAux team negotiates with company representatives to find the SecUnit. They offer to buy it and threaten a lawsuit, but the company refuses, telling them that its memory has been wiped anyway. Pin-Lee files an injunction to seize Murderbot for evidentiary reasons, while Gurathin manages to retrieve the data that was downloaded during the memory wipe. He locates Murderbot's personality files by searching for Sanctuary Moon episodes. The team saves Murderbot from being destroyed, and Gurathin uploads its personality back. Murderbot recognizes that without its armor it looks like an augmented human. The team invites Murderbot to live as a free agent on their home planet. That night, Murderbot attempts to sneak away, but is intercepted by Gurathin, who tries to make it feel welcome. Murderbot insists, and when Gurathin relents, Murderbot thanks him; posing as a servant bot, it boards a transport ship that departs, as Mensah awakens and realizes that it has left.

== Production ==
The book series was optioned in the late 2010s, and its film adaptation was considered. In 2021, book series author Martha Wells said that a potential TV series adaptation was in development and that she had read the script and was "really excited about it". A ten-episode series was green lit by Apple TV+ in 2022, with Wells serving as a consulting producer. The production design team, led by Sue Chan, started work in the autumn. Tommy Arnold, the Murderbot Diaries special edition illustrator, created the concept art for the show.

After the casting was delayed by the 2023 SAG-AFTRA strike, in December 2023 it was announced that Alexander Skarsgård would produce and star in the series. He developed the character and the world of Murderbot with the showrunners. In February 2024, David Dastmalchian and Noma Dumezweni joined the cast. In March, Sabrina Wu, Tattiawna Jones, Akshay Khanna, and Tamara Podemski joined the cast.

On July 10, 2025, the series was renewed for a second season. Showrunners Chris and Paul Weitz suggested the second season would combine the next three books of the series and will have longer episodes. In August 2026, it was announced that there would be 25 recurring and guest actors in the second season, including Wanda Sykes, Bridget Everett, Michael Sheen, Steve Buscemi, and Tramell Tillman.

=== Filming ===
Principal photography for the first season took place from March–June 2024, in Toronto and parts of Ontario, Canada. Most of the filming was done on location, with the Sanctuary Moon scenes filmed on a virtual production stage.

Principal photography for the second season began in mid-2026, in Madrid, Spain. It is planned to last 71 days, with Martha Wells also visiting the set.

== Release ==
The first two episodes of Murderbot premiered on Apple TV+ on May 16, 2025, with subsequent episodes released weekly. The first season consists of ten episodes.

== Reception ==
Even before the release of the show, numerous media sources had commented on the titular character as being coded as autistic and agender.

On the review aggregator website Rotten Tomatoes, Murderbot has an approval rating of 96% with an average score of 7.5/10, based on 76 critics' reviews. The website's critical consensus states, "Alexander Skarsgård's superbly dry wit brings a lot of heart to Murderbot, making for a refreshingly jaunty sci-fi saga about finally coming out of one's shell". Metacritic, which uses a weighted average, assigned a score of 70 out of 100, based on 28 critics, indicating "generally favorable" reviews.

Some reviewers have criticized Murderbot's changes to Wells' original books. Angela Watercutter of Wired noted that the series has significant tonal differences from the books and noted the show's changes to characters, particularly Murderbot and Dr. Mensah, and Wells' social commentary.

=== Accolades ===
Murderbot was a finalist for the 2025 Dragon Award for Best Science Fiction or Fantasy TV Series.

The episode All Systems Red won Best Dramatic Presentation, Short Form at the 2026 Hugo awards.

Tommy Arnold won the 2025 Concept Art Association Award in the category of Live-Action Series Character Art for his work on Murderbot.

Alexander Skarsgård was nominated for the 31st Critics' Choice Award for Best Actor in a Comedy Series in 2026.

Carrie Grace and Laura Jean Shannon were nominated for a Costume Designers Guild Award in the category of Excellence in Sci-Fi/Fantasy Television for their work on FreeCommerce.

Amanda Jones was nominated for a Composers & Lyricists Award for Outstanding Original Title Sequence for a Television Production.
