= The Three Clever Kings =

Book by Mary De Morgan

- Author: Mary De Morgan
- Original title: Ye Three Clever Kings
- Illustrator: Walter Crane
- Language: English
- Series: The Necklace of Princess Fiorimonde
- Genre: Fairytale
- Publisher: Macmillan & CO.
- Publication date: 1886, London
- Media type: Print (Ebook & Paperback)
- Pages: 18

"The Three Clever Kings" is a children's fairy tale from the anthology The Necklace of Princess Fiorimonde that was written by Mary De Morgan. The story was illustrated by Walter Crane, first published by MacMillan & CO. in 1886, and later published in a collection called The Necklace of Princess Fiorimonde – The Complete Fairy Stories of Mary De Morgan by Victor Gollancz Limited in 1963. This collection of fairy tales was digitized in July 2006 and the first E-book was released February 25, 2012. The E-book was produced by David Edwards, Josephine Paolucci, the Online Distributed Proofreading Team, and edited by The Project Gutenberg E-book.

== Author ==
Mary De Morgan was born in 1850 in London, UK. De Morgan was a successful Victorian Era children's short story writer. In her writing career, De Morgan developed three individual collections which started with On a Pincushion (1877), then The Necklace of Princess Fiorimonde (1880), and finally, The Windfairies (1900). The first two collections were successfully published by 1800 and her career as a Victorian Era writer continued to flourish. De Morgan aimed to create stories that recreated her brother's illustrations. Her focus was reading to young children her written works of short stories in the Victorian fairy-tale genres. Tragically, De Morgan died in Egypt in 1907.

== Characters ==
King Roland: An old King who is upon his death-bed and ready to pass on his royalty and all the hard work that comes with the title. He has no sons of his own. Fortunately, King Roland has three nephews that he believes will help take over his duties of being the King. He plans to have the oldest nephew take on the tasks of being a King first and if that shall not work out the next, younger nephew will be of charge and so on.

Aldovrand: One of the main round characters who is the oldest of the three nephews to King Roland. His character traits are lazy, self-centered, and ignorant.

Aldebert: One of the main characters who is the middle aged nephew to King Roland. As a static character he holds compliant, relaxed, and positive characteristics throughout the short story.

Alderete: One of the main characters; the youngest of the three nephews to King Roland. His characteristic traits that carried through the short story are optimistic, happy, and peaceful.

The Political Council: These one-dimensional, stock characters consist of Prime Minister, Chancellor, Commander-in-Chief, and Lord High Admiral.

The Tinker: An old man who travels from house to house mending wares. The tinker's flat character consists of confidence and politeness.

The Sweeper: A man who cleans the chimneys around town as a hobby and job. The Sweeper's crude characteristics include enthusiastic, comfortable, and obedient.

The Farmer: A man who works on a farm looking after animals and maintaining the crops. The Farmer is a very kind, patient, and flat character.

== Summary ==
The story tells the cycle of three young men, the king's nephews, who attempt to rule the kingdom after the death of their uncle, King Ronald. The eldest nephew, Aldovrand, is first in line to test his abilities as king. Aldovrand proves to be selfish in nature and demands extreme independence from all. The Prime Minister and Chancellor turns to Aldovrand, asking questions regarding the kingdom. Aldovrand does not like being disturbed by them and decides to run away. While leaving the kingdom Aldovrand runs into a farmer who offers him a job watching his geese. Next in line to test his abilities as king is the second nephew, Aldebert. Aldebert is confronted with conflicts such as increasing the army's wages, repairing the kingdom's city, and also saving money for the kingdom. He grants everyone's wishes but it resulted in great disagreement. Aldebert can not deal with the conflicting decisions and runs away. While leaving the kingdom, Aldebert runs into a tinker, who offers him a job. Alderete, the last nephew is next to test his abilities as king. Excited to reign, Alderete explores the kingdom and commands that drastic lifestyle changes need to be made. The people in the city starts an uproar and protest against Alderete's demands. The pressure is too much, and Alderete runs away in fear. While he is leaving the kingdom, he runs into a chimney sweeper and becomes his apprentice. In panic, The Prime Minister and Chancellor return to the three nephews pleading for them to become King. All three nephews decline and proceed happily with their new jobs leaving behind any luxuries and power that could have been theirs as King.

== Moral ==
Wealth, power, and luxuries are not key to one's happiness. Instead, pursue a career that fits one's interests, and happiness will follow.
