= Tattiawna Jones =

Canadian actress

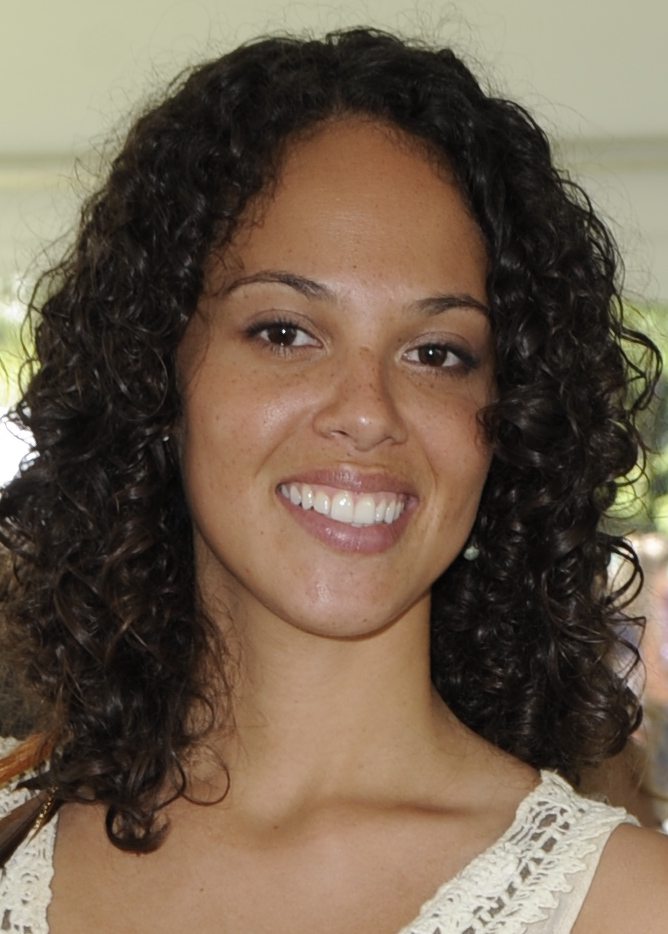
- Jones in 2011
- Born: Manitouwadge, Ontario, Canada
- Occupation: Actress
- Years active: 2009–present

Tattiawna Jones is a Canadian television and theatre actress.

== Early life and education ==
Jones was born in Manitouwadge, Ontario, Canada. She graduated from York University with a Bachelor of Fine Arts.

== Filmography ==
=== Film ===
Year	Title	Role	Notes
2010	Ice Castles	Melissa	
2011	Keyhole	Lota	
2011	Fade In	Crystal	Short
2013	Tru Love	Angie	
2014	RoboCop	Mayor's Assistant	
2017	Apart from Everything	Lana	Short
2018	Tick. Tock. Inc	Justine Jason	Short
2018	Dragged Across Concrete	Denise	
2018	Tully	Violet	
2020	The Nest	Coach	
2020	The Broken Hearts Gallery	Dr. Amelia Black	
2021	Under the Christmas Tree	Charlie Freemont	
2024	The Light Before the Sun	Joanne the therapist	
2025	Dinner with Friends	Joy	

=== Television ===
Year	Title	Role	Notes
2009	Unstable	Store Clerk	TV film
2009–2012	Flashpoint	Winnie Camden	Main role (51 episodes)
2010–2011	Connor Undercover	Zatari	Recurring role (4 episodes)
2011	Breakout Kings	Vanessa	"One for the Money", "Where in the World is Carmen Vega"
2011	Rookie Blue	Tanya Makin	"Bad Moon Rising"
2011	Against the Wall	Jill Glantz	"Obsessed and Unwanted"
2011	Lost Girl	Daphne	"Mirror, Mirror"
2011	Heartland	Kelly James	"Never Let Go", "The Slippery Slope", "Cover Me"
2012	Republic of Doyle	Anne Marie Booth	"Hot Package"
2012	The L.A. Complex	Dawna	Recurring role (season 2, 4 episodes)
2012	Transporter: The Series	Alba	"Dead Drop"
2013	Cracked	Annalise Byrne	"Rocket Man"
2013	Murdoch Mysteries	Louise Butler	"Victoria Cross"
2014–2015	Strange Empire	Isabelle Slotter	Main role (13 episodes)
2014–2017	19-2	Amelie de Grace	Main role (26 episodes)
2015	The Expanse	Weapons Officer	"Remember the Cant", "CQB"
2016	Eyewitness	Kamilah Davis	Main role (10 episodes)
2017–2018	The Handmaid's Tale	Ofglen #2 / Lillie Fuller	Recurring role (9 episodes)
2018	Take Two	Piper Mannox	"The Devil You Know"
2018	The Bold Type	Jessica	Recurring role (3 episodes)
2019	Bradley Borgen ~ The Actor Who Could Not Cry	Mugger #1	TV film
2019	The 100	Simone Lightbourne VI	Recurring role (7 episodes)
2019; 2021	Lost in Space	Ava	Recurring role
2020	Transplant	Julia Baranski	Recurring role (2 episodes)
2021–2022	Station Eleven	Lara	"Dr. Chaudhary"
2023	Orphan Black: Echoes	Emily	Recurring role (6 episodes)
2025	Murderbot	Arada	Main role
2025	Wayward	Rabbit	Main role
2026	Vladimir	Alexis	Episodes: "We Have Always Lived in the Castle", "Because It Is Bitter And Because It Is My Heart"
