= Ile-Rien =

Series of fantasy novels by Martha Wells

The Ile-Rien books are a series of fantasy novels by Martha Wells set in the fictional country of Ile-Rien. It is a centralized monarchy governed by the Fontainon dynasty, governing from their ornate capital of Vienne. It is also the home of the university-city of Lodun, a great center of learning, producing world-renowned scholars in medicine, law and sorcery. Its neighbors are the nations of Adera, Umberwald and Parscia, as well as Bisra, its long-standing enemy. Ile-Rien shares a coastline along the Western Ocean with Parscia.

Superficially, Ile-Rien resembles France, with its highly sophisticated culture, cuisine and fashions, as well as its one-time rarefied nobility. Many of the names invented by Wells have a Gallic flavor to them. Additionally, Wells uses French terms with respect to food and drink. Although the name "Ile-Rien" resembles the French for "Island of Nothing", Wells has stated that she did not intend this. The name also resembles "Rien Nle," a planet in C.J. Cheryh's Chanur novels.

Over the course of the series, Ile-Rien develops technologically and culturally, with advances such as gas lamps replacing candles, before being replaced by electric lights, and trains and motor-cars replacing horse-drawn conveyances. The government, once an absolute monarchy, develops into a more meritocratic and representative system supplementing the crown.

== The Element of Fire ==
In the first book of the series, The Element of Fire (1993), Ile-Rien is ruled by the Dowager Queen Ravenna, who was the daughter of the previous king, who shares power with her son, King Roland, and his new queen consort, Falaise. Queen Ravenna's consort, King Fulstan, is deceased. The Princess Katherine, Fulstan's bastard daughter by the Queen of Air and Darkness, Moire, maintains an uneasy relationship with both her brother Roland and Ravenna. A skilled yet capricious sorceress, she goes by the name Kade Carrion.

The fictional nation of Ile-Rien is portrayed as a refined and baroque culture with a high aristocratic class and orders of knights still prevalent, roughly equivalent to 17th century France. A significant difference is the omnipresence of sorcery and magic. The University of Lodun produces internationally esteemed sorcerers, who are vital to the governance of the nation and its security. The Royal Palace in Vienne requires a court sorcerer to maintain the complex and interlocking wards around the grounds to prevent attack from its terrestrial enemies, as well its otherworldly ones, the Fay, inhabitants of the faerie-world, both the Seelie and Unseelie Courts, as well that of Kade Carrion's own mother.

== Death of the Necromancer ==
In The Death of the Necromancer (1998), the second novel, society in Ile-Rien has advanced to a stage equivalent to that of 19th century France, with elements of Victorian England as well. A young Fontainion queen, a descendant of King Roland, still rules in Vienne, yet the society seems to be advancing into a nascent industrial stage, with gas lamps and steam-powered trains becoming common.

This book was a finalist for the Nebula Award given out by the Science Fiction and Fantasy Writers of America.

== The Fall of Ile-Rien trilogy ==
In the trilogy titled the Fall of Ile-Rien, comprising the novels The Wizard Hunters, (2003) The Ships of Air (2004), and The Gate of Gods (2005), society in Ile-Rien has progressed to a stage that is similar to the early 20th century, with electric lights, motor-cars and telephones. However, magic and its applications are still common, and highly integrated into Riennish culture and society. While still a wealthy and prosperous nation, Ile-Rien is succumbing to a brutal invasion from the Gardier, a mysterious sorcerous race, and much of its magnificent buildings and institutions are in ruins. The Gardier placed the city of Lodun under siege, trapping its powerful sorcerers behind an impenetrable barrier, making them unavailable to the war effort, where they are sorely needed.

This being a grand age of technology and progress, opulent ocean liners such as the massive Queen Ravenna (inspired by the Cunard Line's Queen Mary) and Queen Falaise have been converted from their original purposes into troop transport and evacuation ships. The young Fontainon Queen from Necromancer has aged and married, and relocated the government from besieged Vienne to neighboring Parscia, Ile-Rien's ally in the war. In addition to the Queen herself, the royal family also consists of the Prince Ilaron and the adolescent Princess Olympe.
