= The Death of the Necromancer =

1998 fantasy novel by Martha Wells

- Author: Martha Wells
- Language: English
- Series: Ile-Rien
- Genre: Fantasy
- Publisher: Eos Press/HarperCollins
- Publication date: 1998
- Publication place: United States of America
- Media type: Print
- Pages: 359 (Hardcover)
- ISBN: 978-0380973347
- Preceded by: The Element of Fire
- Followed by: The Wizard Hunters

The Death of the Necromancer is a 1998 fantasy novel by Martha Wells. It was first published by Eos/HarperCollins.

== Synopsis ==
In the city of Vienne in the land of Ile-Rien, master criminal Nicolas Valiarde discovers that his elaborate plans for revenge are being disrupted by the return of a supernatural menace from centuries past.

== Reception ==
The Death of the Necromancer was a finalist for the 1999 Nebula Award for Best Novel.

Kirkus Reviews considered it to be "thoroughly engaging", with "splendid plotting and characters and agreeably varied magics".

At SF Site, Steven H. Silver judged the plot to be "relatively simple", and in particular questioned the likelihood of Valiarde taking years to construct both a criminal empire and an entire separate persona as part of his planned revenge, only to be distracted at the last minute by the seemingly uninvolved Doctor Octave; Silver did, however, laud Wells for having created characters and a setting that "retain the readers' attention", and for avoiding a "comedy of errors" situation, ultimately stating that the novel was "worth reading".

== Background ==
Wells has stated that her portrayal of Valiarde was based on her desire to "write a protagonist who in most books like this would be the antagonist, if not the outright villain."

The novel has a Sherlock Holmes theme, with Valiarde being based on Professor Moriarty, his assistant Reynard Morane being based on Sebastian Moran, his law-enforcement nemeses Inspector Ronsarde and Doctor Halle being based on Holmes and Doctor Watson, and his companion Madeline being based on Irene Adler ("but also Ellen Terry and Sarah Bernhardt").
