= Network Effect (novel) =

2020 science fiction fantasy novel by Martha Wells

- Author: Martha Wells
- Language: English
- Series: The Murderbot Diaries
- Release number: 5
- Genre: Science fiction
- Published: 5 May 2020
- Publisher: Tor Books
- Publication place: United States
- Pages: 350
- ISBN: 9781250229861

Network Effect is a 2020 science fiction novel written by Martha Wells. It is the fifth work in the Murderbot Diaries series and the first full-length novel. Network Effect won the 2021 Hugo Award for Best Novel, the 2020 Nebula Award for Best Novel, and the 2021 Locus Award for Best Science Fiction Novel.

== Plot ==
Murderbot has been sent by Dr. Mensah on a research expedition that includes her daughter Amena, her brother-in-law Thiago, and Drs. Arada, Overse, and Ratthi. Their ship is set upon by a hostile transport vessel, which Murderbot and Amena are compelled to board as the others flee in an escape pod. As the transport moves into a nearby wormhole, Murderbot hunts the grey-skinned humanoids in control of the ship, isolates Amena and the human captives Ras and Eletra in a safe zone, and begins to realize that the transport is the same one once controlled by its robot pilot friend ART.

Arada and the others, who have followed the ship into the wormhole, are able to board as Murderbot finishes off the hostiles and manages to reload a deleted ART with a code phrase left for it. As Murderbot guessed, after being invaded by the grey raiders, ART sent them after the SecUnit ostensibly for use as a weapon, but really because ART determined that Murderbot could overcome them. Murderbot is enraged that ART would endanger the SecUnit's humans this way, and is further annoyed when ART insists that Murderbot and its human crew help find and recover the transport vessel's missing crew.

Murderbot and its team descend to the planetary colony that seems to be at the center of the situation, and find that the colonists have been exposed to alien remnant contamination. They have developed the grey skin condition to varying degrees, and have separated into warring factions representing the least contaminated versus the most, who seem controlled by an alien hive mind. The missing crew have effected their own escape, and while Arada and her people help them, Murderbot is captured. ART begins firing missiles at the colony, demanding its release. Murderbot is rescued with the help of another SecUnit whose governor module it disabled, as well as a software version of itself set loose on the colony's defenses. Murderbot considers whether it wants to accompany ART and its crew on their next mission.

== Reviews ==
An NPR review said that "...if the first books [in the Murderbot Diaries series] were episodes in a four-part TV miniseries, then Network Effect is the feature-length movie with the bigger budget and scope, and it is no less enjoyable." and a "wonderful continuation of the series". Locus described Network Effect as "a perfectly paced space opera adventure novel, one in which Murderbot continues to grow as a person."
