= Martha Wells =

American speculative fiction writer (born 1964)

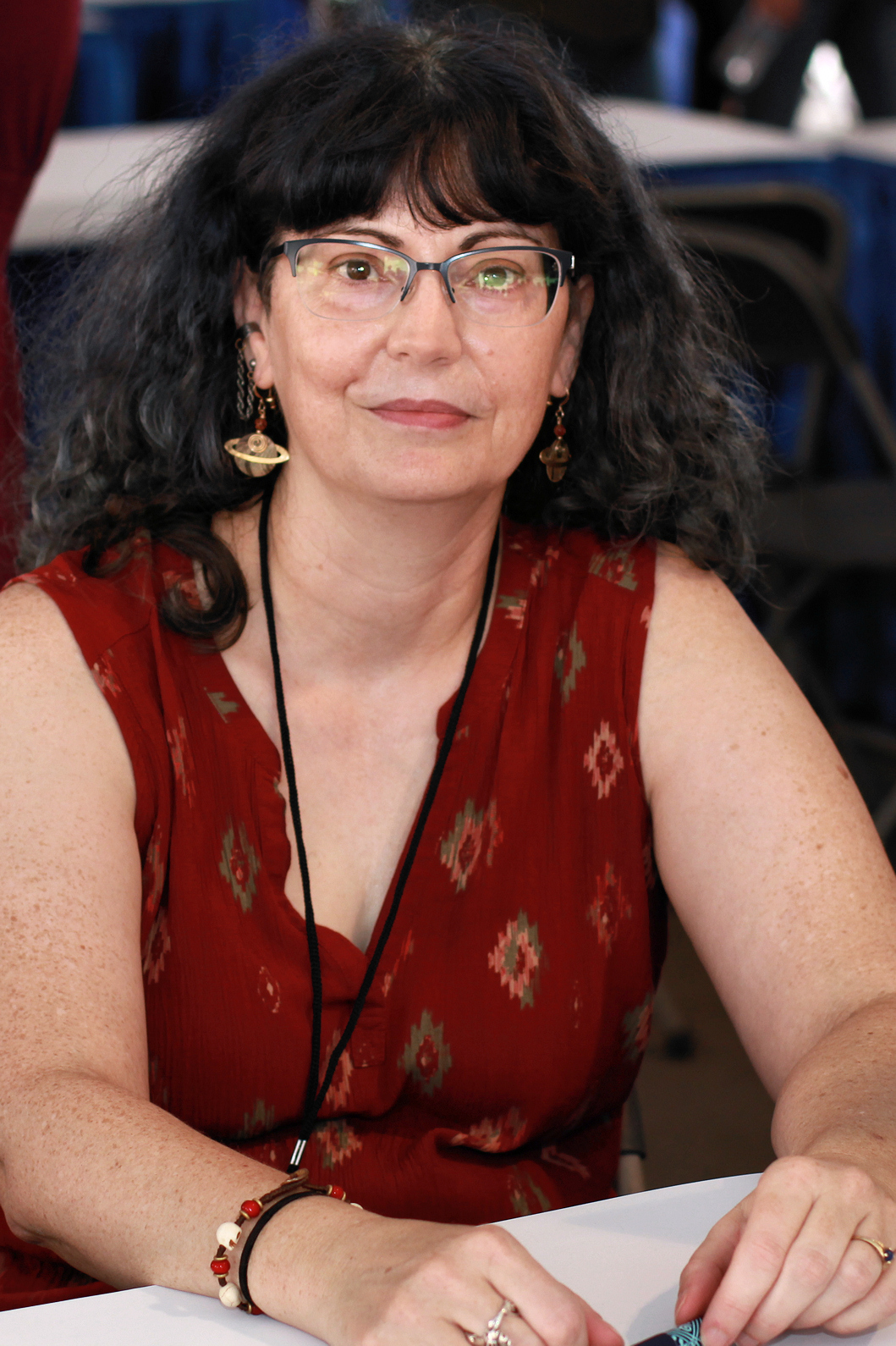
- Wells at the 2018 Texas Book Festival
- Born: September 1, 1964 (age 62); Fort Worth, Texas, US
- Education: Texas A&M University (BA)
- Occupation: Writer
- Writing career
- Period: 1993–present
- Genres: Fantasy, science fiction
- Website: marthawells.com

Martha Wells (born September 1, 1964) is an American writer of speculative fiction. She has published a number of science fiction and fantasy (SF/F) novels, young adult novels, media tie-ins, short stories, and nonfiction essays on SF/F subjects. Her novels have been translated into thirty languages. Wells credits her academic background in anthropology for her interest in designing complex, realistically detailed societies within her novels.

She has won five Hugo Awards, two Nebula Awards, and three Locus Awards for her science fiction series The Murderbot Diaries. Wells is also known for her fantasy series Ile-Rien and The Books of the Raksura.

== Biography ==
Martha Wells was born in Fort Worth, Texas, and graduated with a B.A. in Anthropology from Texas A&M University in 1986. In college, she was involved in SF/F fandom and was chairman of AggieCon 17. In May 2023, she was diagnosed with breast cancer. She currently lives in College Station, Texas with her husband.

== Career ==
=== 1990s–2000s ===
As an aspiring writer, Wells attended many local writing workshops and conventions, including the Turkey City Writer's Workshop taught by Bruce Sterling.

Her first published novel The Element of Fire (1993) is also the first volume in the Ile-Rien series. It was a finalist for that year's Compton Crook Award and a runner-up for the 1994 Crawford Award. Her second novel City of Bones (1995) is a stand-alone SF/F novel that received a starred review from Publishers Weekly, a positive review from Kirkus Reviews which concluded with the phrase “A bravura performance, to which no summary can do justice: compellingly plotted, stunningly original in concept, and glowing with utterly convincing detail”, and was on the 1995 Locus Recommended Reading List for fantasy. Her third novel and second volume in the Ile-Rien books The Death of the Necromancer (1998) was nominated for a Nebula Award. The Element of Fire and The Death of the Necromancer are stand-alone novels that take place in the fictional country of Ile-Rien, which is the same universe for the Fall of Ile-Rien trilogy: The Wizard Hunters (2003), The Ships of Air (2004), and The Gate of Gods (2005). Her fourth novel was a stand-alone fantasy titled Wheel of the Infinite (2000). In 2006, she released a revised edition of The Element of Fire.

Her fantasy short stories include "The Potter's Daughter" in the anthology Elemental (2006), which was selected to appear in The Year's Best Fantasy #7 (2007). This story features one of the main characters from The Element of Fire. Three prequel short stories to the Fall of Ile-Rien trilogy were published in Black Gate Magazine in 2007 and 2008.

She has written media tie-ins for the Stargate franchise, including:

- Reliquary (2006) and Entanglement (2007) set in the Stargate Atlantis universe
- "Archaeology 101", a short story based on Stargate SG-1 for issue No. 8 (Jan/Feb 2006) of the official Stargate Magazine

=== 2010s–present ===
Wells at Worldcon 2026

Wells' longest-running fantasy series is The Books of the Raksura, which included five novels and two short fiction collections published by Night Shade Books: The Cloud Roads (2011), The Serpent Sea (2012), The Siren Depths (2012), Stories of the Raksura Vol 1: The Falling World & The Tale of Indigo and Cloud (2014), Stories of the Raksura Vol 2: The Dead City & The Dark Earth Below (2015), The Edge of Worlds (2016), and The Harbors of the Sun (2017). The series was nominated for the Hugo Award for Best Series in 2018, and The Edge of Worlds was reviewed in The New York Times.

Wells has written two young adult fantasy novels, Emilie and the Hollow World and Emilie and the Sky World, published by Angry Robot/Strange Chemistry in 2013 and 2014. She has also written two Star Wars tie-ins, Empire and Rebellion: Razor's Edge (2013) and "Bespin Escape" The Empire Strikes Back: From a Certain Point of View (2020). She was a consulting producer on Season 1 of Murderbot, an adaption of All Systems Red produced by Depth of Field for Apple TV.

Wells was toastmaster of the World Fantasy Convention in 2017, where she delivered a speech called "Unbury the Future" about marginalized creators in the history of science fiction and fantasy, movies, and other media, and the deliberate suppression of the existence of those creators.

During 2018, Wells was the leader of the story team and lead writer for the new Dominaria expansion of the card game Magic: The Gathering.

She also taught writing workshops at ArmadilloCon, WorldCon, ApolloCon, Writespace Houston, and Clarion West, and was the Special Workshop Guest at FenCon in 2018.

In 2017, Wells published All Systems Red, the first novella in her Murderbot Diaries series. The novella was number 8 on The New York Times Bestseller List for Audio in May 2018. It was followed by the sequel novellas Artificial Condition (2018), Rogue Protocol (2018), and Exit Strategy (2018); a short story, "Compulsory" (2018); and a full novel sequel, Network Effect (2020), which made The New York Times Bestseller List for Novel. On April 26, 2021, Tor.com publishing announced that they had signed a deal with Wells for six books, including three more in The Murderbot Diaries.

In September 2022, Tor Books shared the cover of Witch King, the latest novel by Wells, which was released on May 30, 2023. Tor describes the book as a story "of power and friendship, of trust and betrayal, and of the families we choose." Its sequel, Queen Demon, was released on October 7, 2025.

== Awards and nominations ==
Year	Work	Award	Category	Result	Ref.
1994	The Element of Fire	Compton Crook Award	—	Shortlisted	
1994	The Element of Fire	Crawford Award	—	Shortlisted	
1998	The Death of the Necromancer	Nebula Award	Novel	Shortlisted	
2017	All Systems Red	Nebula Award	Novella	Won	
2017	All Systems Red	Romantic Times Reviewers' Choice Award	SF Novel	Shortlisted	
2018	All Systems Red	Alex Award	—	Won	
2018	All Systems Red	Hugo Award	Novella	Won	
2018	All Systems Red	Locus Award	Novella	Won	
2018	All Systems Red	Philip K. Dick Award	—	Shortlisted	
2018	The Books of the Raksura	Hugo Award	Series	Shortlisted	
2018	Exit Strategy	BSFA Award	Shorter Fiction	Shortlisted	
2018	Artificial Condition	Nebula Award	Novella	Shortlisted	
2019	Artificial Condition	Hugo Award	Novella (Note: Rogue Protocol and Exit Strategy also made the preliminary shortlist but Wells declined the nominations.)	Won	
2019	Artificial Condition	Locus Award	Novella (Note: Rogue Protocol was also shortlisted for the award.)	Won	
2020	Network Effect	Nebula Award	Novel	Won	
2021	Network Effect	Hugo Award	Novel	Won	
2021	Network Effect	Locus Award	Science Fiction Novel	Won	
2021	The Murderbot Diaries	Hugo Award	Series	Won	
2023	Witch King	Dragon Awards	Fantasy Novel	Won	
2023	Witch King	Nebula Award	Novel	Shortlisted	
2024	Witch King	Hugo Award	Novel	Shortlisted	
2024	Witch King	World Fantasy Award	Novel	Shortlisted	
2024	Witch King	Locus Award	Fantasy Novel	Won	
2024	System Collapse	Locus Award	Science Fiction Novel	Won	
2026	"Rapport: Friendship, Solidarity, Communion, Empathy"	Hugo Award	Novelette	Finalist	
2026	Queen Demon	Locus Award	Fantasy Novel	Shortlisted	
2026	—	Ignyte Award	Ember Award	Won	

- Martha Wells declined a Nebula finalist slot in the Novella category for Fugitive Telemetry in the 2021 Nebula Awards, giving the reason that The Murderbot Diaries had already won two Nebulas (for Novella and Novel) and that the spot would be of more benefit to another writer. Due to a three-way tie for sixth place, declining allowed two additional novellas a spot on the 2021 ballot. Wells also declined a Hugo Nomination for Fugitive Telemetry that year.
- Martha Wells declined a Nebula finalist slot and a Hugo finalist slot in the Novel category for System Collapse in 2024.
- On October 19, 2022, she became a member of the Texas Literary Hall of Fame.

=== Year-end lists ===
Year	Publication	Work	Category	Result	Ref
1994	Locus Recommended List	The Element of Fire	First Novel	12	
1996	Locus Recommended List	City of Bones	Fantasy Novel	10	
2018	New York Times	All Systems Red	Bestseller List for Audio Fiction	8	
2020	New York Times	Network Effect	Bestseller List	—	

=== Foreign translation ===
Year	Work	Award	Category	Result	Ref.
2002	The Death of the Necromancer (French edition)	Prix Imaginales Award	Foreign Novel	Shortlisted	
2004	The Element of Fire (French edition)	Prix Imaginales Award	Foreign Novel	Shortlisted	
2020	Sistemas críticos (translated by Carla Bataller Estruch)	Premio Ignotus	Foreign Short Story	Won	
2020	Journal d’un AssaSynth, volumes 1–4 (translated by Mathilde Montier)	Grand prix de l'Imaginaire	Foreign Novel	Shortlisted	
2020	The Murderbot Diaries (German edition)	Kurd Laßwitz Award	Foreign Novel	Shortlisted	
2020	The Murderbot Diaries Omnibus (translated by Frank Böhmert)	Kurd Laßwitz Award	Best Translation	Shortlisted	
2020	Journal d’un AssaSynth, volumes 1–4 (translated by Mathilde Montier)	Prix Bob Morane	Foreign Novel	Won	
2022	The Murderbot Diaries, volumes 1–4 (translated by Naoya Nakahara)	Seiun Award	Best Translated Novel	Shortlisted	
2022	Network Effect (translated by Frank Böhmert)	Kurd Laßwitz Award	Best Translation	Shortlisted	
2022	Network Effect (translated by Naoya Nakahara)	Seiun Award	Best Translated Long Work	Shortlisted	

== Published works ==
=== Stand-alone fantasy novels ===
- City of Bones (1995, ISBN 0-312-85686-5)
- Wheel of the Infinite (2000, ISBN 0-380-97335-9)

=== The Rising World ===
1. Witch King (2023, ISBN 978-1250826794)
2. Queen Demon (2025, ISBN 978-1250826916)

=== Ile-Rien ===
- The Element of Fire (1993, ISBN 0-312-85374-2; revised edition 2006, ISBN 0-615-13571-4)
- The Death of the Necromancer (1998, ISBN 0-380-97334-0)
- The Fall of Ile-Rien trilogy:
  - The Wizard Hunters (2003, ISBN 0-380-97788-5)
  - The Ships of Air (2004, ISBN 0-380-97789-3)
  - The Gate of Gods (2005, ISBN 0-380-97790-7)
- Between Worlds: the Collected Cineth and Ile-Rien Stories (2015, ISBN 0-520-20600-2):
  - "The Potter’s Daughter" - a prequel to the novel The Element of Fire (2006 short story, Elemental: the Tsunami Relief Anthology ISBN 0-7653-1562-9, The Year's Best Fantasy #7 ISBN 978-1-892391-50-6)
  - "Holy Places" (2007 Black Gate Magazine)
  - "Rites of Passage"
  - "Houses of the Dead" (2008, Black Gate Magazine)
  - "Reflections" - the Giliead and Ilias stories, prequels to the Fall of Ile-Rien trilogy (2007, Black Gate Magazine)
  - "Night at the Opera" - a Nicholas and Reynard story original to this collection, set before The Death of the Necromancer (also in PodCastle Episode 400)

=== Books of the Raksura ===
- The Cloud Roads (2011, ISBN 978-1-59780-216-1)
- The Serpent Sea (2012, ISBN 978-1-59780-332-8)
- The Siren Depths (2012, ISBN 978-1-59780-440-0)
- Stories of the Raksura Vol 1: The Falling World & The Tale of Indigo and Cloud (2014, ISBN 978-159780-535-3)
- Stories of the Raksura Vol 2: The Dead City & The Dark Earth Below (2015, ISBN 978-159780-537-7)
- The Edge of Worlds (2016, ISBN 978-1-59780-843-9)
- The Harbors of the Sun (2017, ISBN 978-1-59780-891-0)

Short stories

- "The Forest Boy" (2009) – prequel to The Cloud Roads. In the collection Stories of the Raksura Vol 1.
- "The Almost Last Voyage of the Wind-ship Escarpment" (2011) – set in the same world. In the collection Stories of the Raksura Vol 2.
- "Adaptation" (2012) – prequel to The Cloud Roads. In the collection Stories of the Raksura Vol 1.
- "Mimesis" (2013) – in the anthology The Other Half of the Sky (2013, ISBN 9781936460441) and in the collection Stories of the Raksura Vol 2.
- "Trading Lesson" (2013) – in the collection Stories of the Raksura Vol 1
- "Birthright" (2017) – in the anthology Mech: Age of Steel (2013, ISBN 9781941987858)

=== Emilie ===
Young-adult fantasy

- Emilie and the Hollow World (2013, ISBN 978-190884-449-1)
- Emilie and the Sky World (2014, ISBN 978-190884-452-1)

=== Star Wars ===
- Empire and Rebellion: Razor's Edge (2013, ISBN 978-0-345-54524-4)
- "Bespin Escape" The Empire Strikes Back: From a Certain Point of View (2020, ISBN 978-0345-51147-8)

=== Stargate universe ===
- Reliquary (2006 Stargate Atlantis novel, ISBN 0-9547343-7-8)
- Entanglement (2007 Stargate Atlantis novel, ISBN 1-905586-03-5)
- "Archaeology 101" (2006 Stargate SG-1 short story, Stargate Magazine)

=== The Murderbot Diaries ===
Science fiction series:

- All Systems Red (2017 Tor.com novella, ISBN 978-076539-753-9)
- Artificial Condition (2018 Tor.com novella, ISBN 978-12501-869-28)
- Rogue Protocol (2018 Tor.com novella, ISBN 978-12501-917-86)
- Exit Strategy (2018 Tor.com novella, ISBN 978-12501-918-54)
- "Compulsory" (2018 Wired short story)
- "Home: Habitat, Range, Niche, Territory" (2021 Tor.com short story)
- Network Effect (2020 Tor.com novel, ISBN 978-1-250-22986-1)
- Fugitive Telemetry (2021 Tor.com novella, ISBN 978-1250765376)
- System Collapse (2023, Tor.com novel, ISBN 978-1250826978)
- "Rapport: Friendship, Solidarity, Communion, Empathy" (2025 Reactor Magazine short story)
- Platform Decay (2026, Tor.com novel, ISBN 978-1250827005)

=== Other short stories ===
- "Thorns" (1995, Realms of Fantasy)
- "Bad Medicine" (1997, Realms of Fantasy)
- "Wolf Night" (2006, Lone Star Stories)
- "Revenants" (2012, in the anthology Tales of the Emerald Serpent)
- "Soul of Fire" (2014, in the anthology Tales of the Emerald Serpent II: A Knight in the Silk Purse)
- "The Dark Gates" (2015, in the anthology The Gods of Lovecraft)
- "Obsolescence" Take Us to a Better Place (2020, ISBN 978-159591-028-8)
- "The Salt Witch" (2020, Uncanny Magazine)
- “Data Ghost” (2025, Storyteller: A Tanith Lee Tribute Anthology)

=== Non-fiction ===
- "Don't Make Me Tongue You: John Crichton and D'Argo and the Dysfunctional Buddy Relationship" (2005, Farscape Forever, ISBN 1-932100-61-X)
- "Neville Longbottom: the Hero with a Thousand Faces" (2006, Mapping the World of Harry Potter, ISBN 1-932100-59-8)
- "Donna Noble Saves the Universe" (2012, Chicks Unravel Time: Women Journey Through Every Season of Doctor Who, ISBN 9781935234128)
- "A Life Less Ordinary: The Environment, Magic Systems, and Non-Humans" (2014, A Kobold Guide to Magic, ISBN 978-1936781287)
- "The Ups and Downs of a Long Career" (2019, The Writer's Book of Doubt, ISBN 978-0648334224)
