= Peace and War =

Book by Joe Haldeman

- Cover of first edition
- Author: Joe Haldeman
- Cover artist: Dominic Harman
- Language: English
- Series: The Forever War series
- Genre: Science fiction novel
- Publisher: Gollancz
- Publication date: 2006
- Media type: Print (Paperback)
- Pages: 400 pp
- ISBN: 0-575-07919-3
- OCLC: 70764917

The Peace and War omnibus is a collection of the three books in Joe Haldeman's The Forever War series. The omnibus was released in 2006.

Books included in the omnibus include:

- Forever Free
- Forever Peace
- The Forever War

== Trivia ==
Originally removed from the 1974 novel's publication, the middle section consisting of Mandella returning to Earth was re-inserted in this omnibus edition.
