= The Forever War (disambiguation) =

The Forever War is a novel by Joe Haldeman.

The Forever War may also refer to:

- The Forever War (board game), a board game by Mayfair Games, based on Haldeman's novel
- The Forever War (comics), a graphic novel drawn by Marvano, based on Haldeman's novel
- The Forever War (non-fiction book), a book by Dexter Filkins about the wars in Afghanistan and Iraq, 1998–2006
- The forever war, a political-science concept of an endless war led for either military or political reasons

== See also ==
- Forever War (disambiguation)
