= The Accidental Time Machine =

2007 novel by Joe Haldeman

- Softcover edition
- Author: Joe Haldeman
- Cover artist: Annette Fiore-DeFex
- Language: English
- Genre: Science fiction
- Publisher: Ace Books
- Publication date: August 2007
- Publication place: United States
- Media type: Print
- Pages: 275 (mass market edition)
- ISBN: 978-0441014996

The Accidental Time Machine is a science-fiction novel written by Joe Haldeman and published by Ace Books in 2007. The story follows protagonist Matthew Fuller, a physics research assistant at the Massachusetts Institute of Technology, as he accidentally creates a machine that can only jump ahead in time, by exponentially longer periods each time. Fuller travels to the year 2252 where he finds society has been decimated by war and become a theocracy based on the Second Coming of Jesus which occurred 71 years earlier, and to the year 4346 where he finds society is ruled by an artificial intelligence. Fuller is joined by Martha from 2252 and La from 4346 traveling further into the future until they meet other time travelers who are able to send them back in time. The novel explores themes of societal and individual susceptibility to forms of autocracy. The novel was a finalist for a Nebula Award and a Locus Award.

== Background ==
American science fiction author Joe Haldeman was 64 years old at the time of publication of The Accidental Time Machine. His best known work was The Forever War series in which two of the novels had won both the Hugo and Nebula awards. His most recent novels were Camouflage and Old Twentieth had been published in 2004 and 2005, respectively, with Camouflage winning the Nebula Award for Best Novel. During this time Haldeman also worked as an adjunct professor teaching writing at the Massachusetts Institute of Technology where The Accidental Time Machine is partially set.

== Plot summary ==
The protagonist, Matthew Fuller, is a research assistant for physics professor Jonathan Marsh at the Massachusetts Institute of Technology, in 2057, when he builds a calibrator to supply one photon per unit of time. When he presses the reset button, the box unexpectedly disappears for one second. When he presses the button a second time, he finds it disappears for about 10 seconds. The third time, it disappears for a bit less than three minutes. Fuller deduces it is traveling forward in time at intervals approximately 11.8 times the previous interval and he further deduces how to bring other objects, such as himself, along. On the seventh press of the button, Fuller and the box are taken 39 days into the future and unexpectedly land on a busy road. He is arrested on suspicion of murder but is bailed out of jail by an anonymous person he comes to believe is himself from the future. He continues forward, 465 days, then 15 years, when he is greeted by Professor Marsh who tracked Fuller and calculated the theoretical physics behind time travel (and won a Nobel Prize for it).

Unsatisfied, Matt travels to 2252 where he learns that the Second Coming of Jesus has occurred and resulted in the One Year War. Society is now governed by a theocracy led by Jesus and shuns technology. Jesus had anticipated Fuller's appearance at the Massachusetts Institute of Theosophy, where he is appointed to be professor with a female student named Martha assigned to be his assistant. As Fuller tries to scientifically rationalize Jesus's seeming omnipotence, Jesus orders Fuller to destroy the time machine but he instead flees, along with Martha, and lands in the year 4346 outside of California. There they find a society where all of humanity is wealthy and satisfied to a point of apathy. It is here that they encounter an artificial intelligence, named La, that controls Los Angeles. La is curious about her own mortality, and having learned about Matt's time machine from historical records, wishes to join him on a journey to the end of time (heat death of the universe) to discover if she can die.

Matt and Martha begin to receive messages in their dreams from beings that appear to Matt as future versions of himself and to Martha as Jesus. He/they warn Matt and Martha of La's willingness to sacrifice their lives in pursuit of her goal, and advises them to stall for time to allow them to catch up. Matt and Martha, accompanied by La in a spacecraft, begin to travel further into the future, discovering evermore unfamiliar species of life, including androgynous evolutions of humanity and a race of intelligent bears. Time travelers are not always welcome - some future societies having been devastated by diseases brought from the past by such travelers for which future humans had no immunity, and therefore regard them as a dangerous threat.

After a confrontation where they narrowly avoid being killed by La, they meet the people who have been sending them subliminal messages. These beings offer to send Matt and Martha back in time, while allowing La to continue jumping forward in time. The beings can specify either the exact time or the exact location to which Matt and Martha will be sent, but not both (this limitation is similar to the uncertainty principle). Concerned about the couple possibly materializing in the middle of the ocean or inside of a mountain, they opt to be specific about location and send them to MIT.

When they arrive, they find that it is the late 19th century, and the main MIT campus in Cambridge has not yet been built. Having no other option, they live in this society, where Matt studies and teaches physics, aided significantly by his advanced knowledge both of physics and historical events. However, he takes care not to change history – for example, he does not anticipate Albert Einstein in "discovering" the theory of relativity, as he could have easily done; rather, he takes care to appear a talented but not outstanding professor. Matt and Martha have several children, and the end of the book reveals that Professor Marsh (Matt's MIT professor in the mid-21st century) is actually Matt's descendant.

=== Timeline and list of societies ===
- February 2, 2058: Matt's first time jump - 39 days. Appears in the middle of the street, still in Boston, Massachusetts.
- May 15, 2059: 465 days later. Appears on a busy highway.
- 2074: 15 years later. Matt appears on a field in a stadium named the "Matthew Fuller Sports Centre". The society is similar to 2057 but with advances in science and technology and new cultural trends, like facial scarring.
- 2252: 177 years later. Matt appears near the New Hampshire border in a theocratic society ruled by a being who claims to be Jesus. The inhabitants shun technology and the study of history before the One Year War which they believe was fought between believers and non-believers of Jesus following his Second Coming. They refer to the year as 71.
- 4346: 2094 years later. Matt and Martha arrive near California in a society governed by an artificial intelligence named La. There appears to be no poverty or illness and the inhabitants live by the rules of bartering focused on material wealth.
- 24,709 years later. Martha, La, and Matt land in the Pacific Ocean off the coast of Indonesia and travel to Australia and America. They are greeted by a hologram which does not allow them contact with society due to its experience with disease transmitted by other time-travelers. They otherwise encounter bioengineered dinosaurs and bear-like people.
- 320,000 years later. There appears to be no life on Earth and they travel to the Moon. They only encounter large, hostile mechanical creatures.
- 3.5 million years later. They meet six other time-travelers who send Martha and Matt to the past and La to the future.
- 1898. Martha and Matt arrive back in Boston.

== Style and themes ==
The futures he visits are more commentaries on present day societies, rather than Haldeman's trying to predict what the future will actually be like. But the science sounds good, and using other worlds to comment on one's present is a viable, informative, and entertaining literary device with roots that go back to Jonathan Swift, and probably further.

— Charles de Lint, Fantasy and Science Fiction

Like other fiction that depicts time travel, The Accidental Time Machine is a cautionary story. The novel illustrates the susceptibility of people to autocracy. The protagonist, Fuller, acts suspicious of the Jesus figure that appears to control society in 2252. After he seeks to escape the theocracy, he unquestioningly submits to the equally autocratic artificial intelligence, La, who controls society in 4346. Fuller is described as a scientist and an atheist which makes him more susceptible to accepting a scientifically-controlled society and suspicious of a theocracy. Upon suspecting that La intends to abandon or betray him, and finding himself in ever more inhospitable and alien environments, Matt again unquestioningly follows the instructions of the voices he hears in his dreams, like Martha does (but in her case because she believes them to be from Jesus). The story was compared to H. G. Wells's The Time Machine for its warnings of theocratic hoaxers and the danger of complacency.

The Accidental Time Machine was compared and contrasted to Haldeman's earlier works in The Forever War series which similarly followed a protagonist traveling to future times. However, in The Forever War, the story is told from the perspective of a soldier experiencing time dilation, and the focus is on social systems, rather than an academic purposefully choosing to go forward, and the focal theme was on political and economic systems.

== Publication and reception ==
The Accidental Time Machine was released in the United States on August 7, 2007, as a hardcover published by Ace Books, the science fiction imprint of Berkley Books of the Penguin Group. The paperback and ebook versions were released a year later on July 29, 2008. An audiobook, narrated by Kevin Free, was published by Recorded Books in September 2008. The book was nominated for the 2008 Nebula Award for Best Novel, and the 2008 Locus Award for Best Science Fiction Novel.

The novel was characterized as "fun and compulsively readable" and thoughtful. The reviewer in the Magill Book Reviews found the "High points include Haldeman's deft sketches of an intriguingly changed world at various periods, the relationship between Martha and Matt, and the satisfying choice to return them from the alien, entropic far-future to a place and period that offers comforts and rewards." However, reviewers also noted an uneven pace with a slow beginning and "frenetic final series of chapters". Reviewer Karen Burnham, in Strange Horizons wrote: "In the end, I think this book might have been better served by cutting to the chase earlier, excising a large section of the first third, and losing Martha's romantic education. Then it could have been published as a novella instead of a novel."

Haldeman's look at these societies of the centuries to come is intriguing, and even plausible, although I'm honestly sorry he didn't spend longer in some of them. As soon as we got comfortable, he was off again to the next one. I'd have enjoyed seeing Matt stay longer in the future theocracy (where Jesus literally rules) and the future barterocracy (for lack of a better word) as they both held a lot of promise. The deus ex machina which comes into play near the end didn't light my fires either; [...] I don't know what exactly I was expecting; after all, we knew the trip was one-way and if Matt was ever to return to the past (something that was quite broadly suggested to have happened) he had to encounter something capable of reversing the process. I guess it all seemed to end rather abruptly where that point was concerned. This book could have been longer by several hundred pages and I would have been happy.

— Michael M. Jones, "The Accidental Time Machine". SF Site. 2007. 14. Oct 2010.

== See also ==
- Flight to Forever
- The Late Philip J. Fry
