= Forever War =

Forever War may refer to:

- The Forever War, a 1974 science fiction novel by Joe Haldeman
  - The Forever War, a graphic novel adaptation of the above
- Perpetual war, concept of fighting a war without an expectation that it can ever end
  - War on terror, an international military campaign launched by the United States, following the September 11 attacks in 2001

== See also ==
- The Forever War (disambiguation)
