= Matthew Fuller =

Matthew or Matt Fuller may refer to:

- Matt Fuller, rugby league player
- Matt Fuller (American football), college football running back
- Matt Fuller (Australian rules footballer), drafted by Western Bulldogs in the 2013 AFL Draft
- Matthew Fuller (author), 20th century British writer on media theory
- Matthew Fuller, character in The Accidental Time Machine
- Matthew le Fuller, MP for Wycombe (UK Parliament constituency)
