= Free forever =

Free forever can refer to:

- A free-to-play online game that will never have a fee

== See also ==
- Forever Free (disambiguation)
