= None So Blind (short story) =

- Short story by Joe Haldeman
- Genre: Science fiction

Publication
- Published in: Isaac Asimov's Science Fiction Magazine
- Publication type: Magazine
- Publication date: November 1994

"None So Blind" is a science fiction short story by Joe Haldeman. It won the Hugo Award for Best Short Story and the Locus Award for Short Story in 1995, was nominated for the Nebula Award in 1994.

== Plot summary ==
A nerd falls in love with a blind musician, and wonders, “Why aren't all blind people geniuses?” This leads him to develop an experimental procedure to repurpose the visual cortex of her brain to amplify intelligence.

== Sources, references, external links, quotations ==
- None So Blind title listing at the Internet Speculative Fiction Database
- Text of the story at JoeHaldeman.com

Specific
