= Dallas Barr =

Belgian comic series

- Hard cover version of the first Dallas Barr album
- Author: Joe Haldeman
- Illustrator: Mark Van Oppen
- Current status/schedule: Finished
- Launch date: 1996
- End date: 2005
- Publisher(s): Dupuis, Le Lombard
- Genre(s): Adventure, Fantasy

Dallas Barr is a comic book series (or "graphic novel") by Belgian artist Marvano (Mark van Oppen) adapted from American science fiction author Joe Haldeman's 1989 novel Buying Time. The protagonist, Dallas Barr, is 132 years old. The series takes place around 2075, in a world where a prolonged life is available to the ultrarich through the Stileman Procedure, where the moon is a colony and AIDS-X is rampant. The series ran from 1996 to 2005.

Although the first comic in the series clearly draws on Joe Haldeman's Buying Time ( UK title: The Long Habit of Living), the plots of the following volumes continue beyond the end of the original novel. The plots of the continuation were written by Haldeman in English, translated into French by Marvano. The later volumes are written by Marvano alone, as Haldeman found him to do a good job. In the series the author challenges the reader to reflect on the issues at hand. Politics, philosophy and humanity's stupidity are often given a chance in this series. Over the years, the plot got more complicated and the characters came to their full potential, while at the same time its philosophical considerations deepened.

== Albums ==
- Dallas Barr, Dupuis
  - 1.Immortalité à vendre, 1996
  - 2.Le Choix de Maria, 1997
  - 3.Premier Quartier 1998
  - 4.Nouvelle Lune, 1999
  - 5.Anna des mille jours, 2000
- Dallas Barr, Le Lombard
  - 6.Sarabande, 2005
  - 7.La Dernière Valse, 2005
