= Camouflage (novel) =

2004 science fiction novel by Joe Haldeman

- Cover of first edition (hardcover)
- Author: Joe Haldeman
- Cover artist: Craig White
- Language: English
- Genre: Science fiction
- Publisher: Ace Books
- Publication date: 2004
- Publication place: United States
- Media type: Print (hardback & paperback)
- Pages: 296
- ISBN: 0-441-01161-6
- OCLC: 55877569
- Dewey Decimal: 813/.54 22
- LC Class: PS3558.A353 C36 2004

Camouflage is a 2004 science fiction novel by American writer Joe Haldeman. It won the James Tiptree, Jr. Award in 2004 and the Nebula Award for Best Novel in 2005.

Parts of the novel were originally serialized in Analog Science Fiction and Fact (March, April and May, 2004).

== Plot summary ==
A million years prior to the dawn of Homo sapiens, two immortal, shapeshifting aliens, wholly unknown to each other, roam the Earth without memory of their origin or their purpose. In the year 2019, an artifact is discovered off the coast of Samoa, buried beneath the ocean floor. The mysterious find attracts the alien beings—the "changeling" and the "chameleon"—to Samoa, where one ponders the meaning of the object and the other speculates on its relationship to each of them. Both immortals seek each other for different reasons: one harbours good intentions toward humanity and wishes to protect all life, while the other is extremely hostile and enjoys killing.

== Plot ==
A million years before the rise of humans, the changeling arrives on Earth from Messier 22; its spaceship hides deep in the Pacific Ocean. The changeling lives in the ocean for millennia, taking the form of a great white shark, killer whale, or porpoise while it explores. Eventually it discovers humanity and wades ashore, eager to learn.

San Guillermo, California, 1931. The changeling takes the form of (and unwittingly kills) the first person it comes across, a handsome, wealthy young man named Jimmy Berry. Because it cannot speak English (yet), Jimmy's friends assume that he has brain damage, and the changeling is sent home to his parents.

Baja California, 2019. Dr. Russell Sutton is a marine engineer who runs the small firm Poseidon Projects. He is approached by elderly Admiral Jack Halliburton, who has a for-profit job for Poseidon: recover a submarine sunk in the Tonga Trench, and then "find" a mysterious cigar-shaped object located nearby. Jack wants to use Russell's team as camouflage, because all he really cares about is getting the object – for himself.

Chapters alternate between the stories of the changeling and its various lives over decades; of Russ's attempts to decipher the artifact; and of the chameleon, whose story begins in Eurasia in the Pre-Christian Era. The chameleon is always a man, and usually brutal. He can change his looks in a moment (unlike the changeling, who needs several minutes and suffers while doing so). The chameleon has often been a soldier, fighting for example with Alexander the Great and as a Masai warrior; much later in America he makes a vast fortune.

The changeling begins to learn about humanity with Jimmy Berry's parents. They have specialists brought to their mansion to test it, and it learns to read, draw, play piano, and speak. The changeling has eidetic memory, so these tasks are easy; human psychology baffles it. When a nurse seduces it, it learns about sex; when next seduced, the changeling is unaware that it has hurt the woman badly, and in 1932 it is sent to a private psychiatric hospital, where it learns a great deal more about the range of human behaviors than a coddled rich boy normally would.

Jack and Russ move their team to Apia, Samoa. The artifact proves difficult to move, as it is possibly three times as dense as plutonium, but they bring it to the beach and build a wall around it. Dr. Franklin Nesbitt, Chief of NASA Advanced Planning, comes to them with a proposal: To share much of the enormous cost of the project, he wants to add a team of researchers to the Poseidon Project, for what he seeks: His team, half of whom are exobiologists, want to learn about the creature they suspect is alien. The new team includes Jan Dagmar, one of the exobiologists, who quickly befriends Russ. In 2020, the team attempts many ways to make an impression on the artifact; when they try to communicate with it, they get a surprising momentary result.

In 1935, the changeling attends the University of Massachusetts to study oceanography, then the Woods Hole Oceanographic Institution; it senses that something important to it will be found in marine science. Its studies are interrupted by World War II. In 1941, it takes part in the Bataan Death March, during which "Jimmy" sees horrific incidents which humanize the changeling; it learns friendship and pity. The changeling escapes Bataan and spends years swimming back to America as a shark; meanwhile, the chameleon enjoys war atrocities and becomes assistant to Josef Mengele at the Auschwitz concentration camp.

In 1948, the changeling comes to shore in California. It attends college at Berkeley to study literature and anthropology. When it learns of Project Sign, it begins to wonder whether there are other extraterrestrials on Earth. The chameleon also hunts for other aliens, so that he may enjoy fighting and killing them.

In 2021, Jan Dagmar begins to send a complex message to the artifact, by beaming at it in every frequency from microwave to X ray, and by tapping it mechanically. The team plunges the artifact into different atmospheres – specifically, those of the planets and moons of the Solar System – in case the object might recognize one of them as "home-like" and respond.

For many years, the changeling earns further doctorates in astronomy, astrophysics, marine biology and biotechnology. It attends Massachusetts Institute of Technology to study computers. It works on the SETI project, then leaves academia for several years to work in the circus, get married, and otherwise learn more about humanity. After re-creating itself as a woman many times, it finds that it prefers to be one, though for a long time it establishes an identity as Professor Jimmy Coleridge at the University of Hawaii. It occasionally exhibits a human playfulness: turning into a shark, for example, and then swimming up to the local campus's marine cameras and dissemblingly doing something "unsharklike."

In 2019, the changeling learns about the artifact at Apia and, feeling "a shock of recognition," determines to join the team there. The chameleon has also come to Apia and pleasures itself by killing people. In 2021, the artifact answers Jan's tests by tapping back. The changeling borrows biological and job information from a Californian woman, Rae Archer, to apply for a job at Poseidon. She is interviewed by Russ and Jan, and gets a job as a technician. Part of this job requires trying to crack the message that the artifact has sent. While working on it, "Rae" and Russ fall in love. Rae can do enormous computations in her head while working with others or pretending to sleep, and soon becomes convinced that the message that the artifact emitted is meant for herself.

The impersonation of Rae Archer is exposed by the CIA. Agents plan an ambush for Russ and Rae by allowing them to think that they have won a weekend at a luxury hotel, the Aggie Grey. The changeling enters the room first, and the agents assault her; one blows off her left arm with a double-barreled shotgun. The changeling smashes through the balcony, runs across the traffic, and dives into the water, where it changes into a shark again. "Rae" decides to approach Russ again, to reunite with him as well as to approach the artifact, and creates a new personality, Sharon Valida, a pretty blonde.

Meeting Russ one night as Sharon, she has sex with him, reveals herself as both Rae and an extraterrestrial, and insists that he take her to the artifact site. Russ agrees, and the changeling changes itself to look like Jan, so that they can get through the security checkpoints. As Rae approaches the artifact, which she now recognizes as her spaceship, Jack Halliburton appears in the room, traps them there, and reveals himself as the chameleon. Rae fights the chameleon, but almost loses the battle while trying to protect Russ. At last, her spaceship traps "Jack," and, revealing her true self (large, shimmering, colorful, "inhumanly beautiful"), she tells Russ that she must return home. Russ begs to go with her and they joyfully enter the spaceship and leave for her planet.

== Characters ==
- Changeling: An extraterrestrial who is fascinated by people and learns to share their joys and fears, and to love. It can manufacture new bodily appearances, clothes, money, passports, and almost anything else it needs, out of the basic material of itself. Among the many personalities it takes are Jimmy Berry, Professor Jimmy Coleridge, Rae Archer and Sharon Valida.
- Dr. Russell Sutton: A marine engineer whose company, Poseidon Projects, is hired by Admiral Jack Halliburton to lift the artifact from the sea bed. He falls in love with Rae Archer, then with Sharon Valida, then with the changeling as itself.
- Chameleon: Posing as Jack, he hires Russ to retrieve the artifact. For millennia, he seeks any other extraterrestrial on Earth, in order to destroy it. The fact that Jack is the alien is not revealed until the end, when he attempts to murder Russ and the changeling.
- Jan Dagmar: Exobiologist, leader of the NASA team which endeavors to understand the nature of the artifact.
- Naomi: A well-muscled young woman, part of Jan's team.
- Moishe: Jan's senior technician.
- Hugh: The changeling's first friend, a soldier in the Marines who suffers through the Bataan Death March with "Jimmy."

== Themes ==
- Camouflage is the novel's major theme. The chameleon (as Admiral Jack Halliburton) says of himself that he wears the naval uniform for "protective coloration." Unafraid to hide his secrets in plain sight, he talks about extraterrestrials, calls himself a "total barbarian" and likes steaks so rare they're blue inside, a hint of his predatory nature, but Russ and Jan, who admit they find him intimidating, are fooled. It is unknown what he looked like originally, as an extraterrestrial. The changeling, hoping to find others like itself, spends years as different people with different appearances, in circuses, universities, and other settings. It investigates marine life and humans with biological oddities in case they are aliens, though these activities are only reported and not described in the novel.
- War: As one reviewer put it, Haldeman "is much more than just a military SF writer, but it's clear that Vietnam remains central to his existence and the nightmare inspiration for some of his best work." In Camouflage, the war that receives Haldeman's authorial disgust is World War II, and two particular periods are spotlighted: the Bataan Death March and the atrocities at the Auschwitz concentration camps, where the chameleon enjoys working with Mengele.
- Distrust of the United States government appears throughout the 2019-2021 sections, as though the characters fear it is approaching totalitarianism. Russ and Jack agree to work together on the stipulation that the U.S. is not involved; even the NASA team offers itself as a sort of semi-autonomous agency, with its own budget to spend and no strings attached. Even the changeling, when ambushed in Apia, tells the CIA agents, "You have no jurisdiction here."
- Cultural diversity: To the changeling, all human behavior needs studying; to the chameleon, any sort of human can need assaulting and destroying. Haldeman describes the differences between the Americans and the Samoans, but any hints of racism appear to be only on the part of white American government characters. Haldeman describes Samoa affectionately, spending paragraphs on its views, beauty, and variety of foods.

== Reception ==
=== Awards ===
Camouflage was granted the science fiction ("sf") James Tiptree, Jr. Award, a $1000 prize for "gender-bending fiction," in 2004. One juror, Ursula K. Le Guin, wrote in her decision, "An ageless, sexless entity who can take any form is at first indifferent to gender; as it grows more human, the choice becomes more important to it; it ends up a woman by preference. If gender isn't the central concern of this novel, it's near the center, and the handling of it is skillful, subtle, and finely unpredictable." Another juror, Cecilia Tan, wrote, "Haldeman is a Hemingway scholar, and it shows in the elegance of his minimalist prose in this thought-provoking book. In the best tradition of 'hard' sf, Haldeman mixes scientific speculation with purely human 'what if?' in wondering what would happen if a shape-shifting alien predator became, essentially, human? This book explores the human condition as thoroughly as any literary work, with understanding of gender at the crux of that understanding. For me it was one of the best science fiction books I have read in years."

The novel also earned the Nebula Award for Best Novel in 2005.

=== Critical reception ===
Library Journal wrote, "With his customary economy of words, Haldeman (The Forever War) examines the differences and similarities between human and nonhuman nature as his protagonists face possible destruction. Superb storytelling and a panoramic view of history recommend this novel to most sf collections." Booklist wrote, "Award-winning sf veteran Haldeman proves as engaging a storyteller as ever, especially given this book's irresistible premise and page-turning action."

Entertainment Weekly gave the book a B+ grade: "Haldeman trips through history wearing alien goggles, but his message is all about human nature." (The writer suggested that the book be read as Terminator 3 meets Brother From Another Planet.)

Gerald Jonas of The New York Times Book Review said, "Haldeman handles this complicated scheme effortlessly, and the ending is satisfying whether or not you have figured out who is who. If this smoothly written entertainment has a flaw, it is in the take-it-or-leave-it premise. I had no more trouble accepting two shape-changers than one. What gave me pause was the assumption that while some shape-changing aliens are capable of being changed by their experiences, others are simply born bad."

The San Diego Union-Tribune wrote, "Sometimes grim, always interesting, Camouflage is written with all of Haldeman's characteristic toughness, care and clarity." The Kansas City Star said, "Sometimes the most satisfying tale is the one most simply told. So it is with Joe Haldeman's Camouflage... Haldeman is a Vietnam vet, and he brings his experience and military history to the front. For example, the Bataan Death March makes an indelible impression upon the shape-shifter; as it learns, we learn, and the lessons are ugly truths. There's a vapid movie in the cinemas now [referring to Alien vs. Predator] about aliens and predators that, for millennia, have used Earth as a proving ground. Better to use your imagination and read Haldeman's book."

The Rocky Mountain News wrote that Camouflage "makes fresh and original use of an old and overused plot... Camouflage is an addictive read, one of the strangest love stories around." The Denver Post said, "Joe Haldeman writes a classic tale of aliens with a smooth, simple brilliance that is a joy to read."

The Kansas City Star listed the novel among its 10 Top Speculative Fiction Titles of 2004, and the Long Beach Press-Telegram listed Camouflage among its "Noteworthy Books of 2004."

The Contra Costa Times was unimpressed: "The setup is interesting - an immortal alien on Earth - but the follow-through is pedestrian at best. Haldeman throws in an extra alien for no apparent reason, and the love affair that supposedly wraps up the action is neither solidly developed nor particularly believable." Similarly, Publishers Weekly wrote, "Joe Haldeman's Camouflage, a near-future SF thriller that alternates between the experiences of two different aliens who land on Earth, skillfully weaves its disparate plot threads until the cop-out, deus ex machina ending. This is a more sophisticated, if less than satisfying, handling of a similar situation in Hal Clement's Needle (1950)." Kirkus Reviews also had a mixed reaction: "Well-constructed and intriguingly set up, but ultimately a disagreeable surprise: the story slips away, and you're left holding an empty coat."

== See also ==
- List of underwater science fiction works
