= Study War No More =

- First edition
- Author: Various
- Cover artist: Rick Sternbach
- Language: English
- Genre: Science fiction anthology
- Publisher: St. Martin's Press
- Publication date: 1977
- Publication place: United States
- Media type: Print (Hardcover)
- Pages: 323

Study War No More is a science fiction anthology edited by science fiction author and Vietnam War veteran Joe Haldeman. All of the short stories concern war, and were previously published in other publications. The title is derived from a line in the traditional gospel song "Down by the Riverside": "I ain't gonna study war no more". It was published by St. Martin's Press in 1977, and reprinted by Avon Books in 1978. It has also been published in the United Kingdom, and translated into German and French.

== Contents ==
- Introduction by Joe Haldeman
- "Basilisk" by Harlan Ellison
- "The Dueling Machine" by Ben Bova
- "A Man To My Wounding" by Poul Anderson
- "Commando Raid" by Harry Harrison
- "Curtains" by George Alec Effinger
- "Mercenary" by Mack Reynolds
- "Rule Golden" by Damon Knight
- "The State of Ultimate Peace" by William Nabors
- "By the Numbers", an essay by Isaac Asimov
- "To Howard Hughes: A Modest Proposal" by Joe Haldeman
