= Worlds (novel) =

1981 novel by Joe Haldeman

Worlds is a novel written by Joe Haldeman published in 1981.

== Plot summary ==
Worlds is a novel in which Marianne O'Hara takes an educational trip from New New York in orbit to visit the surface of old Earth, and a worldwide terrorist plot kills almost everyone.

== Reception ==
Colin Greenland reviewed Worlds for Imagine magazine, and stated that "It feels perverse to say that a series about the near extinction of the human race seems uneventful, but somehow it does. The futuristic detail is fascinating, but Haldeman relates it in a casual, rambling way that dilutes much of its drama."

== Reviews ==
- Review by Jeff Frane (1981) in Locus, #242 March 1981
- Review by Algis Budrys (1981) in The Magazine of Fantasy & Science Fiction, August 1981
- Review by Spider Robinson (1981) in Analog Science Fiction/Science Fact, August 17, 1981
- Review by Andrew Andrews (1982) in Science Fiction Review, Spring 1982
- Review by Gene DeWeese (1982) in Science Fiction Review, Fall 1982
- Review by Chris Henderson (1982) in Whispers #17-18, August 1982
- Review by Tom Easton (1982) in Analog Science Fiction/Science Fact, November 1982
- Review by David Pettus (1983) in Thrust, #19, Winter/Spring 1983
- Review by uncredited (2002) in Vector 224
