= The Hemingway Hoax =

1990 novella by Joe Haldeman

First edition (publ. William Morrow) Cover artist: Gary Ruddell

The Hemingway Hoax is a 1990 short novel by the American science fiction writer Joe Haldeman. It weaves together a story of an attempt to produce a fake Ernest Hemingway manuscript with themes concerning time travel and parallel worlds. A shorter version of the book won both a Hugo Award and a Nebula Award for Best Novella in 1991 (for stories in 1990). The shorter version, a condensation of the novel, was originally published in the April 1990 issue of Isaac Asimov's Science Fiction Magazine.

The author wrote: "I've been a student of Hemingway's writing and life for about twenty-five years; sooner or later I had to mine the old man for material."

A literary scholar decides to create a forged copy of Hemingway's missing first novel. He unwittingly interferes with a destined nuclear war which was influenced by Hemingway's stories. The scholar consequently experiences multiple deaths as he keeps shifting between parallel timelines.

== Plot summary ==
In 1921, Hemingway's writing career suffered a setback when his first wife, Hadley Richardson, lost a bag containing the manuscript and all the carbon copies of his first novel as well as most of the short stories he had so far written on a Parisian train. Since that time there has been speculation about the nature of the novel and whether the manuscript survived and may turn up one day.

Seventy-five years later in 1996, John Baird, a Hemingway scholar with a completely eidetic memory, is persuaded by Sylvester "Castle" Castlemaine, a grifter in Key West, to create a fake manuscript to be passed off as one of the lost copies. Initially reluctant, he goes along with this because, with some legal trickery, it may be possible to do it without attracting the attention of the authorities.

However, instead he attracts attention from an altogether different quarter. Somewhere, or somewhen, there are entities who control the paths of destiny in the multiple parallel versions of our world that exist. Anything that affects the cultural influence of Hemingway is a threat to them. We eventually learn that many of the timelines are supposed to end in 2006 with a catastrophic nuclear war when two macho superpower leaders, both influenced by Hemingway's stories, refuse to back down in a crisis. If even a few timelines fail to reach this point, then the reverberations across the Omniverse will be fatal.

Baird carries out research in the Hemingway collection at the John F. Kennedy Library in Boston, and attempts to get aged paper and the exact model of typewriter that Hemingway used. He gets three surprises. First, Hemingway appears to him on a train back from Boston to Florida, and warns him to give up on the scheme. Second, the Hemingway, as he comes to call it, kills him by inducing a massive stroke when he refuses. Third, he wakes up on the same train - or is it the same? He is slightly different himself, with two sets of similar but conflicting memories. The Hemingway entity is surprised as well. Humans are supposed to stay dead. Instead this one shifted to a parallel timeline.

Back in Florida, life continues roughly as before. Castle brings in a seductress to bedazzle the scholar even as he has an affair with his wife Lena. Here the themes of the novel begin to parallel those of Hemingway's own stories. Through multiple encounters with the Hemingway entity, and multiple deaths, Baird stays with the scheme, as much to defy this mysterious tormentor as anything else. Each new world, however, seems a little worse than the last, especially when it comes to Castle's personality. In the final universe, Castle is a psychotic killer whom they attempt to have arrested on an out-of-state warrant.

The Hemingway entity comes to Baird and offers to show him what happened to Hadley's bag, in exchange for giving up on the hoax. Travelling back in time, they see the thief is Hemingway himself, but he speaks to Baird and the entity before vanishing.

Without knowing how, Baird finds himself back in his own time, with the bag. At that point Castle, having escaped arrest, violently kills all his co-conspirators with shotgun blasts. The scholar's awareness persists, and he is able to reverse the flow of time and rearrange events so that the women survive, even as he shoots the grifter and takes a shotgun blast in the mouth, imitating the real Hemingway's suicide.

Now freed from his body, Baird has become like the entity that pursued him. He experiences Hemingway's memories, backwards from the end. Reaching the point where the young Hemingway, devastated and enraged by the loss of the manuscripts, crystallizes his masculine outlook and turns to face his future, Baird's awareness separates and comes to consciousness of his abilities. He moves back in time, steals Hadley's bag, allowing himself to be seen doing it in the person of Hemingway. He drops it off for himself to find in the present, before abandoning time for the spaces between. Thus, the "Baird entity" creates himself out of Hemingway's psychic trauma, and it is implied that he actually creates all the other entities we have encountered in the story.

The novel ends with Hemingway writing the short story "Up in Michigan" in Paris in the 1920s, and suddenly experiencing an odd premonition of doom.

== Author's description of the book ==
Around 1991, Haldeman wrote: ""What is the book about? The subtitle A 'Short Comic Novel of Existential Terror' is accurate. In a way, it's a horror novel tinged with ghastly humor, as the apparently insane ghost of Ernest Hemingway murders a helpless scholar over and over; the scholar slipping from one universe to the next each time he dies, in what is apparently a rather unpleasant form of serial immortality. The tongue-in-cheek explanations for how this could happen qualify the book as a science fiction novel.

... It may be the most 'literary' of my books, but it also has the most explicit sex and the most gruesome violence I've ever written. Nobody will be bored by it."
