= Worlds Apart (novel) =

1983 novel by Joe Haldeman

Worlds Apart is a novel written by Joe Haldeman published in 1983.

== Plot summary ==
Worlds Apart is a novel in which Marianne O'Hara and others survive in New New York after a virus has killed many millions, everyone over the age of twenty, causing the human race to go nearly extinct. New New York and other space colonies are located above the Earth, which has been devastated by the virus, while O'Hara and the other survivors struggle with the aftermath. A parallel plotline deals with the adventures of her nominal husband on Earth who is immune to the virus because of his acromegaly.

== Reception ==
Colin Greenland reviewed Worlds Apart for Imagine magazine, and stated that "It feels perverse to say that a series about the near extinction of the human race seems uneventful, but somehow it does. The futuristic detail is fascinating, but Haldeman relates it in a casual, rambling way that dilutes much of its drama."

== Reviews ==
- Review by Dan Chow (1983) in Locus, #272 September 1983
- Review by Algis Budrys (1984) in The Magazine of Fantasy & Science Fiction, March 1984
- Review by Tom Easton (1984) in Analog Science Fiction/Science Fact, March 1984
- Review by Patrick McGuire (1984) in Fantasy Review, May 1984
- Review by Frank Catalano (1984) in Amazing Stories, July 1984
- Review by C. J. Henderson (1984) in Whispers #21-22, December 1984
- Review by Don D'Ammassa (1984) in Science Fiction Chronicle, #63 December 1984
- Review by Doug Fratz (1984) in Thrust, #21, Fall 1984/Winter 1985
