= The Late Philip J. Fry =

- Futurama episode
- Episode no.: Season 6 Episode 7
- Directed by: Peter Avanzino
- Written by: Lewis Morton
- Production code: 6ACV07
- Original air date: July 29, 2010

Episode features
- Opening caption: If you don't watch it, someone else will

Episode chronology
← Previous "Lethal Inspection"	Next → "That Darn Katz!"
- Futurama season 6

"The Late Philip J. Fry" is the seventh episode in the sixth season of the American animated television series Futurama, and the 95th episode of the series overall. It originally aired on Comedy Central on July 29, 2010. In the episode, Fry attempts to make it on time to a birthday dinner date for Leela. He is sidetracked by Professor Farnsworth and Bender, who force him to test out the Professor's time machine, which only goes forward in time. After overshooting and thus going forward to the year 10,000 AD, they must keep traveling forward in time until a backwards time machine has been invented.

It was written by Lewis Morton and directed by Peter Avanzino. From June 16 to June 23, as part of its "Countdown to Futurama" event, Comedy Central Insider, Comedy Central's news outlet, released various preview materials for the episode, including a storyboard of the time machine and character designs for the aged Planet Express crew. The episode was met with acclaim from critics and won an Emmy Award for Outstanding Animated Program in 2011. In 2013, fans ranked it the fourth best episode in the history of the series.

== Plot ==
Leela and Fry's growing relationship is marred by Fry's constant tardiness. After arriving late for work and standing her up at her birthday lunch date, Fry is determined to make it up to Leela by skipping a party hosted by Hedonismbot and meeting Leela for a birthday dinner date at "Cavern on the Green," a fancy restaurant situated in a deep cave with naturally occurring stalagmites. As Fry prepares to leave for the date, Professor Farnsworth forces him to test his newly invented one-way time machine, which is only able to travel to the future (to prevent changing the past and the creation of paradoxes), by moving one minute forward in time. As the Professor, Bender, and Fry prepare the machine, Fry records a message in a video birthday card for Leela, apologizing for being one minute late and explaining the situation. As he is about to finish, the Professor accidentally pulls the lever too far, sending them forward into the year 10,000 AD. During the trip, Fry loses the card in the time stream. Meanwhile, a nuclear accident at Hedonismbot's party kills all but Hedonismbot, leading Leela and the rest of the crew, who think Fry and the others had gone there, to believe the trio are now dead.

Fry, Bender, and the Professor decide that their only hope of returning to the 31st century is to continue forward in time until they reach a period in which a time machine that can travel to the past has been invented. However, they are repeatedly sidetracked during their travels, encountering numerous periods of Earth civilization (at one point managing to find a time period populated by beautiful and intelligent women who have mastered backwards time-travel, but are sent forward by an angered Bender, who was not let off in an era where robots were conquering humanity), until they arrive at the year One Billion when Earth is barren and all life extinct. Back in the 31st century, Leela takes over Planet Express and turns it into a successful company for over forty years, but still harbors some nostalgia and hurt toward Fry for standing her up before his "death". In the year 3050, she finds the lost birthday card as it emerges from the time stream and learns that Fry did not mean to abandon her. She goes to the empty Cavern on the Green and fires her laser at the ceiling in a way that results in mineral water dripping to form stalagmites that create a message Fry discovers one billion years later, reading that although their time together was short, it was the best time of her life.

Having lost their opportunity to return home, Fry, Bender, and the Professor resign themselves to going to the end of time. After the last existing proton decays, they are amazed to discover that the now empty universe undergoes another Big Bang, and furthermore that it replicates the same universe and its exact events, as opposed to having unique inhabitants and history. They realize that they can continue forward in time and eventually reach the moment that they left in the new copy of the universe (although the Professor takes the opportunity to assassinate Adolf Hitler). They succeed after overshooting their first attempt (with the Professor accidentally killing Eleanor Roosevelt whilst attempting to assassinate Hitler a second time), though the new universe is about 10-feet lower than the previous one, causing the time machine to crush their duplicates in the new universe to death as they enter their machine (avoiding a time travel paradox). Fry rushes to meet Leela and manages to make it to their date on time. After dinner, Fry apologizes for losing his birthday card to her, but Leela dismisses it and tells him that she will always remember their time together. Bender can be seen under the bridge they stand on, burying the bodies of the dead duplicates.

== Production ==
"The Late Philip J. Fry" was written by Lewis Morton and directed by Peter Avanzino. The table reading for this episode took place on October 21, 2009. From June 16 to June 23, as part of its "Countdown to Futurama" event, Comedy Central Insider, Comedy Central's news outlet, released various preview materials for the episode, including a storyboard of the time machine and character designs for the aged Planet Express crew. Comedy Central also released a preview clip of the episode online on July 23, featuring Fry's tardiness to the initial lunch date with Leela.

== Cultural references ==
The episode takes its main inspiration from the Poul Anderson novella Flight to Forever. The short story shares largely the same plot as the episode where two men get stuck in a time machine that only moves forward. The episode contains many other cultural references, particularly to time-travel related fiction, including Planet of the Apes, The Terminator, H.G. Wells' famous novel The Time Machine, Anderson's Tau Zero, and Olaf Stapledon's classic future-history novel Last and First Men. Depictions of the past also include several callbacks to events in previous Futurama episodes. Farnsworth takes advantage of the time travel to kill Adolf Hitler, a classic temporal paradox, but misses and kills Eleanor Roosevelt instead. When the Professor asks the year ten million soldier about the machine revolt, the soldier's response, "We built them to make our lives easier, but they rebelled," is taken from the intro text to Battlestar Galactica. The sound of the time machine is that of the Enterprise in Star Trek: The Original Series. A parody of the 1969 Zager & Evans song "In the Year 2525" accompanies the scenes of Fry, the Professor, and Bender traveling through the various eras of the future. During the song, a castle from the year "one million and a half" may have been visually inspired by the real Broadway Tower, Worcestershire. The episode has also been interpreted as a light homage to Douglas Adams' series The Hitchhiker's Guide to the Galaxy, particularly a scene in which Fry, Bender, and the Professor "casually drink beer and watch the end of the universe".

The episode as whole alludes to the "Big Bounce" model for the origin of the universe, which posits that the Big Bang was actually a reflection of the collapse of a previous universe.

== Broadcast and reception ==
"The Late Philip J. Fry" originally aired on July 29, 2010 on Comedy Central. In its original American broadcast, "The Late Philip J. Fry" drew 100,000 more viewers from the previous week to 2.046 million viewers. It received a 1.3 rating/2% share in the Nielsen ratings and a 1.0 rating/3% share in the 18-49 demographic, up a tenth of a point from the previous week's episode.

The episode received critical acclaim. Zack Handlen from The A.V. Club was enthusiastic about the episode, stating that the episode's jokes and humor were solid throughout. He was pleased that the relationship between Leela and Fry was "finally" addressed, also feeling that up until this episode, "[t]he writing on Leela hasn't been as solid this season". Praising the episode's full use of science fiction and the smart structure of the episode, concluding: "It feels like we're back in the sweet spot here, mixing high and low comedy with sharp ideas, and a surprisingly uncynical sincerity. Everything old is new again, I guess, and that's a very good thing." Robert Canning of IGN gave the episode a 7.5 out of 10, citing it as another example of Futurama's "smart takes" on time travel. He felt that "it showed that there's still a lot of thought going into plotting out these time trips", although he also stated that the episode did not have enough laughs. Later in a list of the 25 best Futurama episodes, IGN named the episode fourth best in 2019. Merrill Bar of Film School Rejects praised the episode, describing it as "[e]very joke hits, every line was sweet, every emotion is true, every visual was eye popping, this episode is Futurama at its finest. If there is any complaint, it's that it took this long for the show to regain this level of quality." He concluded that "[t]his combined with last week's episode has restored my full confidence in the production team". Sean Gandert of Paste rated the episode a 9.4 out of 10, writing: "'Late' was definitely the best episode of the season so far, and ranks with the best the show's ever done. Nearly every episode of this season has been better than the last, and it looks like it's finally reached the peaks it's hit in the past. As of now, I think any doubt about the Futurama's reboot should be pretty damn well silenced."

Series creator Matt Groening considers this episode his favorite episode of the season. On his Facebook account, Maurice LaMarche commented that he found this episode "[h]ilarious, touching, meaningful, philosophical, even metaphysical". He also felt that the episode would be a contender for an Emmy Award. The episode would go on to win the Primetime Emmy Award for Outstanding Animated Program (for Programming Less Than One Hour) at the 63rd Primetime Emmy Awards in 2011.

In 2013, it was ranked #4 "as voted on by fans" for Comedy Central's Futurama Fanarama marathon.

== Tie-in ==
In the Disenchantment episode "Dreamland Falls", when Luci is rewinding the magical crystal ball, for a brief frame, Fry, Farnsworth, and Bender appear in the time machine from this episode, implying that the two series take place in the same universe.

== Awards ==
- Primetime Emmy Award for Outstanding Animated Program (for Programming Less Than One Hour) (2011)

== See also ==
- "The Deconstruction of Falling Stars"
- The Accidental Time Machine
- Flight to Forever
- Timeline of the far future
