= Flight to Forever =

1950 novella by Poul Anderson

- First book edition
- Author: Poul Anderson
- Cover artist: Stanley Pitt
- Language: English
- Genre: Science fiction
- Published: November 1, 1950
- Publication place: United States
- ISBN: 978-1-60239-967-9

Flight to Forever is a science fiction novella by American writer Poul Anderson, first published in serial form in Super Science Stories in November 1950, and then published again in paperback in 1955. This is one of many science fiction works written during the 1950s that involved time travel.

== Plot summary ==
In 1973, physicist Martin Saunders test drives a time machine that Saunders, his girlfriend Eve, and his colleague McPherson have constructed. Martin and his friend Sam Hull set the time machine to the year 2073. Arriving in the year 2073, Martin finds his house in ruins and the nearby village completely gone. The men attempt to return to 1973, only to find that the time machine does not have the energy required to move backwards in time further than 2008. In desperation, they begin to go forward in time in the hope of finding technology that can help them travel back in time.

Arriving in the year 2500, the men visit a futuristic village. They are confronted by a militia that murders Sam and chases Martin back to the time machine. Martin travels to the year 3000, where he meets a tavern keeper named Belgotai, who confirms he must travel forward to a more advanced civilization to find the technology he needs. In exchange for this information, Martin agrees to take Belgotai with him in the time machine.

The men make several stops in various centuries trying to find a backwards time machine. The time machine, which is unable to materialize inside solid matter, gets stuck inside a massive stone pyramid for 20,000 years. The time machine finally materializes in the year 25,296, and the men find that the Earth has been annexed as part of a vast multi-galactic empire.

The two men arrive in the year 50,000 and are granted asylum at a nearby castle. Here they meet Empress Taurey, the last remaining monarch of the empire, and Vargor, a prince and head of the Empress's bodyguard. She explains that the empire has crumbled to the point where the Earth is the only planet remaining. Martin is convinced to help the Empress in her war to reconquer the galaxy. He is able to modify her largest warship to jump through time and surprise the enemy. After the battle, Martin spends a year helping to build a second galactic empire and getting closer to Taurey. He is later drugged by a jealous Vargor, and placed back in the time machine as it is sent forward through time.

For four million years, the time machine is covered by a vast ocean, and when it recedes, Martin appears in an impossible city with godlike beings. They modify his time machine, and send him forward in time. He makes several more stops before finally reaching the end of the universe.

Eventually, after several billion years, the universe begins to reform around the time machine. Martin sees the formation of the universe, the Earth and the Moon and realizes that the universe is cyclical. He eventually is able to pilot forward in time to 1973, where the time machine self-destructs after Martin exits.

== Characters ==
Martin Saunders: The main character of the novella. He is a physicist who is stuck in a time machine that can only go forward. Despite only wanting to travel 100 years into the future, he ends up traveling throughout the whole of time until the end of the Universe. Along the way, he helps to found the second galactic empire, and falls in love with Taurey.

Belgotai: A bartender and mercenary that Martin travels with after the year 3000. He is enlisted as a soldier in the galactic army. He is abandoned when Martin leaves the year 50,000.

Sam Hull: The initial partner with whom Martin sets out from 1973. He is killed in the year 2500 by a militia.

Empress Taurey: The last remaining monarch of the first galactic empire, and later the first monarch of the second galactic empire. She is a love interest of Martin.

Prince Vargor: A prince, and the head of the Taurey's bodyguard. He is in love with Taurey. He drugs Martin, and banishes Martin from the year 50,000 in the time machine.

McPherson: Martin's colleague, who helps him invent the time machine.

Eve: Martin's girlfriend, who helps him invent the time machine.

== Re-releases ==
Flight to Forever has been re-released in several different collections outside of Poul's work. These include Flight to Forever and Other Stories, and The End of the World: Stories of the Apocalypse. It has regularly been re-released within Poul's work in collections of his stories.

== In popular culture ==
Flight to Forever is the main inspiration for the Futurama episode "The Late Philip J. Fry". In this episode, Fry, Bender and Professor Farnsworth get stuck in the professor's time machine, that only moves forward. The plot is largely the same as the novella.

== Reception ==
Flight to Forever was placed on several lists of the best science fiction in 1952 and 1953. It was called a "classic story" by FantasticFiction.com. Amazon hailed it as a "memorable time travel adventure" from one of the "most heralded sci-fi authors of all time".

== See also ==
- The Accidental Time Machine
- Tau Zero
- The Late Philip J. Fry
