= Forever Free =

Forever Free can refer to:

- Forever Free (non-fiction) or Forever Free: Elsa's Pride, third in the Born Free series of books written by Joy Adamson, published in 1962
- Forever Free (novel), a science fiction novel by Joe Haldeman, published in 1999
- Forever Free (Saxon album), an album by Saxon, released in 1992
- Forever Free (sculpture), a sculpture created by Edmonia Lewis in 1867
- "Forever Free", a song by W.A.S.P from The Headless Children, released in 1989
- "Forever Free", a song by Stratovarius from Visions, released in 1997
