= Graves (short story) =

- Short story by Joe Haldeman
- Genre(s): military science fiction

Publication
- Published in: The Magazine of Fantasy & Science Fiction
- Publisher: Mercury Press
- Media type: Print (Magazine)
- Publication date: October 1992

"Graves" is a military science fiction short story by Joe Haldeman about haunted military morticians. It was originally published in October 1992 in The Magazine of Fantasy & Science Fiction and appears in The Year's Best Science Fiction (1993), New Masterpieces of Horror (1996) and The Best of Joe Haldeman (2013).

== Reception ==
"Graves" won the 1994 Nebula Award for Best Short Story and World Fantasy for Best Short Fiction.
