= Tool of the Trade =

1987 science fiction novel by Joe Haldeman

- First edition (publ. William Morrow); Cover artist: Vittoria Semproni
- Author: Joe Haldeman
- Language: English
- Publication date: 1987

Tool of the Trade is a 1987 science fiction/espionage novel by Joe Haldeman.

== Plot ==
In the waning years of the Cold War, Nicholas Foley, a Soviet sleeper agent and a survivor of the World War II siege of Leningrad, is a scientist and technological genius quietly working in American academia. He develops an ultrasonic gadget with which he can indetectably control the minds of others. His wife knows his secrets, but loves him too much to turn him over to Federal authorities. When both the Americans and the Soviets find out what Foley has invented, his wife is kidnapped, and he is forced to flee the CIA and the KGB. He must save his wife, elude capture in a massive manhunt and, at a summit meeting between the President of the United States and the Soviet premier, make a daring masterstroke for peace in our time, and for all time.
