= The Forever War (board game) =

Board game

The Forever War is a board game published by Mayfair Games in 1983. It is based on the novel The Forever War by Joe Haldeman.

== Gameplay ==
The Forever War is a two-player board game of space-based tactical infantry squad combat in future millennia between humans and Taurans. The combats take place on icy planetoids that orbit strategically important collapsars.

In the turn sequence, the attacker moves first with a four-phase turn:

- Rally: officers (if any) move, and attempts can be made to rescue pinned units
- Resolve attacks by Planetary Fighters (if any)
- Move units
- Resolve combat

The defender then has the same turn sequence. Both sides can attack during each combat phase, in effect fighting twice per turn. Combat can be either ranged (opponents are not in the same hex) or melee (opposing units are in the same hex.)

The game components are 250 card stock counters representing human and Tauran troops, officers and weapons; and map pieces that can be laid out in various configurations, producing different maps. The game includes ten scenarios and a point-value chart to enable players to design their own scenarios.

== Reception ==
In the May–June 1984 edition of Space Gamer (Issue No. 69), Ed Rotondaro gave a favorable review, saying, "I thoroughly enjoyed The Forever War. The game plays fast, and really captures the spirit of the novel upon which it is based. Mayfair has a winner here and gamers who buy it will get their money's worth."

In the August 1984 edition of Dragon (Issue #87), Steve List was less positive, pointing out that in addition to the land-based infantry combat found in this game, Haldeman's novel also covered spaceship combat, which this game does not. List also noted that a considerable focus of the novel was on the negative effects of time dilation due to relativistic space travel, something that has very little effect in this game. He also didn't like that all of the supplied scenarios are "frustratingly similar and do not really reflect any of the specific actions described in the novel." List thought the price was too high for what the buyer got: "It is reasonably fun to play, and action moves quickly. But neither the quality of the components nor the design justifies the $17 price tag." He concluded, "As a reflection of the novel on which it was based, The Forever War falls short. To be sure, this is a difficult thing to do well, but the lack of 'book accuracy' in the scenarios makes one wonder if the attempt was even made in earnest."

Russell Clarke reviewed The Forever War for White Dwarf #56, giving it an overall rating of 7 out of 10, and stated that "Forever War is an enjoyable, simple SF ground combat game for those who want a good battle without and extra problems to bother with (like logistics for example). For those who require more detail Starship Troopers is probably better value (it's cheaper too!!)."

== Reviews ==
- Analog Science Fiction and Fact
