= The Forever War series =

Series of science fiction novels by Joe Haldeman

The Forever War series is a series of science fiction novels by Joe Haldeman. Not all of them take place in the same future universe.

The Forever War and Forever Peace both received the Hugo and Nebula Awards for Best Novel.

== The Forever War series ==
- The Forever War (1974) (Nebula Award winner, 1975; Hugo and Locus SF Awards winner, 1976)
- "A Separate War" (1999, short story; appeared first in 1999 in the anthology Far Horizons; collected in 2006 in War Stories and A Separate War and Other Stories) (The story of Marygay Potter after she parts with William Mandella in The Forever War)
- Forever Free (1999) (a direct sequel to the first novel)

== The Forever Peace series ==
- Forever Peace (1997) (while thematically linked to the previous novel, Forever Peace is not set in the same universe: it is an entirely separate work, although published in a combined volume titled Peace and War with The Forever War and Forever Free)
- "Forever Bound" (2010, short story; appears in the anthology Warriors) (a prequel to Forever Peace, it tells the story of Julian Class being drafted and trained as a soldierboy while falling in love with Carolyn)

== Publication ==
Sections of The Forever War were originally published in Analog Magazine as four novellas: "Hero", "We Are Very Happy Here", "This Best of All Possible Worlds", and "End Game". "You Can Never Go Back" was published in Amazing Stories and eventually became part of the paperback version of the novel.

== Graphic Novel adaptations ==
- In 1988, The Forever War was adapted with art by comic artist Marvano into a three-part graphic novel also titled The Forever War. It was originally published in Dutch in Belgium and The Netherlands in 1988, then released in an American edition in 1991. Translations have appeared in French, Spanish, Portuguese, German, Italian, Swedish, Polish and Romanian. It was reprinted with bonus content in 2017.
- A graphic novel adaptation of Forever Free was made as A New Beginning, and then reprinted in 2018 as The Forever War: Forever Free.

== Short stories ==
- "A Separate War", a 1999 Haldeman short story which follows the adventures of Marygay Potter after she and Mandella are separated in the last years of the Forever War, appeared in Far Horizons (edited by Robert Silverberg) and in Haldeman's short-story collection A Separate War and Other Stories (2006).
- "Forever Bound", a 2010 short story which appears in the anthology Warriors. It is a prequel to Forever Peace, and it tells the story of Julian Class being drafted and trained as a soldierboy while falling in love with Carolyn.

== See also ==
- Starship Troopers
- Armor (novel)
