= Marvano =

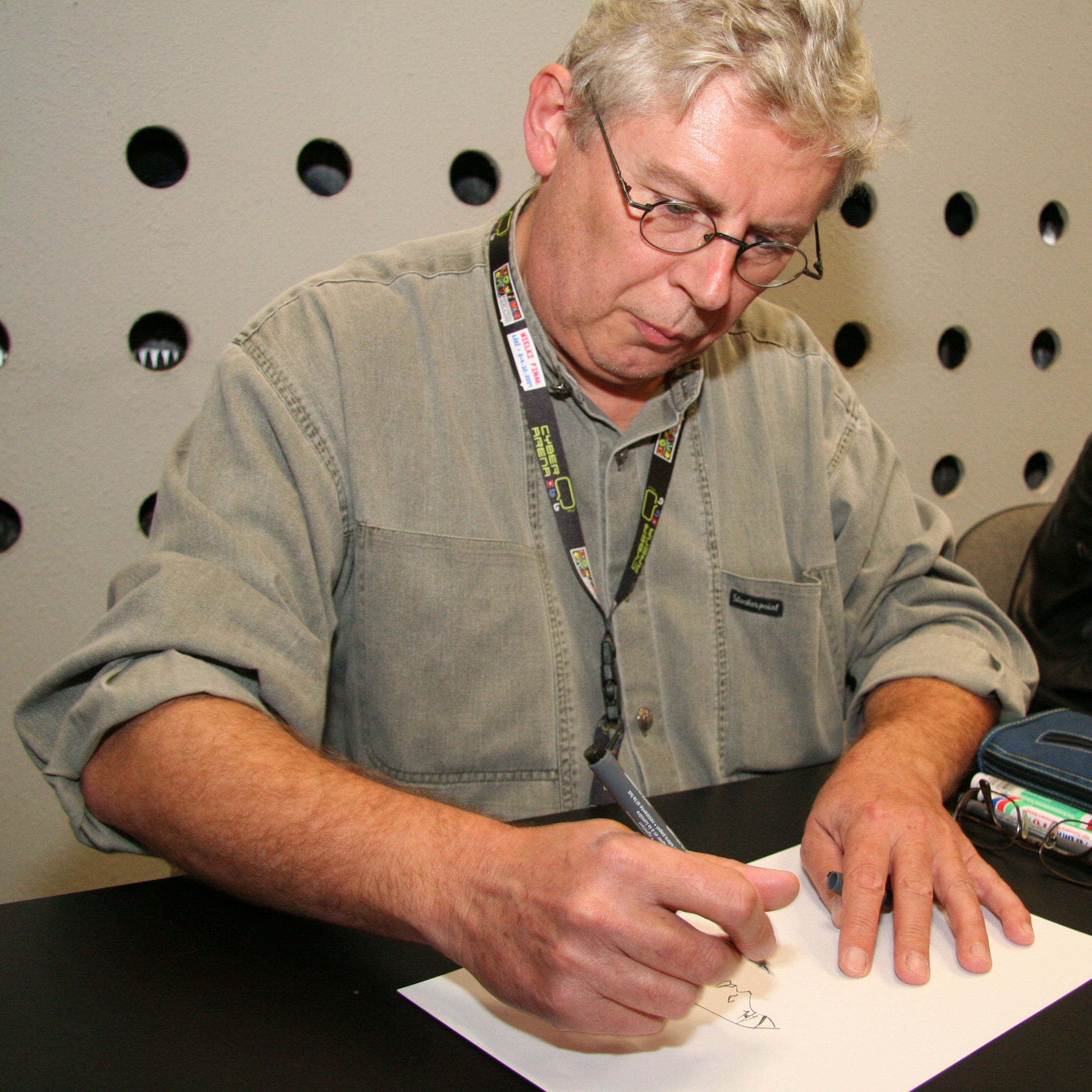
- Marvano at International Comics Festival in Lodz, Poland
- Born: Mark van Oppen; 29 April 1953 (age 73) Zolder, Belgium
- Areas: Cartoonist, Writer, Artist
- Notable works: The Forever War

Mark van Oppen (Zolder, Belgium, 29 April 1953) better known as Marvano, is a Belgian comic artist. He is most famous for the Forever War, in collaboration with Joe Haldeman.

== Biography ==
Born in 1953 in Belgium, he studied interior architecture before working as an illustrator and starting to draw graphic novels. Probably his best-known work is the collaboration with Joe Haldeman on the Forever War graphic novel, an adaptation of the award-winning The Forever War novel. Marvano and Haldeman also worked together on comic adaptations of its direct sequel Forever Free and of the novel Buying time called Dallas Barr. Afterwards he did comics in a historical setting, like Berlin (Berlin in Germany during and after World War II) and Grand Prix (about grand prix racers during the 1930s).
