= Forever Peace =

1997 novel by Joe Haldeman

- Cover of first edition (hardcover)
- Author: Joe Haldeman
- Cover artist: Bruce Jensen
- Language: English
- Series: The Forever War series
- Genre: Science fiction novel
- Publisher: Ace Books
- Publication date: 1997
- Publication place: United States
- Media type: Print (hardback & paperback)
- Pages: 326
- ISBN: 0-441-00406-7
- OCLC: 36133306
- Dewey Decimal: 813/.54 21
- LC Class: PS3558.A353 F6 1997
- Preceded by: The Forever War (1974)
- Followed by: Forever Free (1999)

Forever Peace is a 1997 science fiction novel by Joe Haldeman. It won the Nebula Award, Hugo Award and John W. Campbell Memorial Award in 1998.

== Plot ==
Though its title is similar to The Forever War, and both novels deal with soldiers in the future, Forever Peace is not a direct sequel and takes place on a different future of Earth in 2048.

Using remotely controlled, nearly invincible robots called "soldierboys", the Alliance military fights third-world guerrillas in an endless series of economy-driven wars. As only first-world nations possess the nanoforge technology that can produce anything from basic materials, conflict is largely asymmetric.

The novel is told partly in first-person narration by the main character, Julian Class, and partly by an anonymous third-person narrator, who comments on aspects of Julian's personality and background.

The main protagonist, Julian Class, is a physicist and a mechanic who operates a soldierboy. Thanks to electronic "jacks" implanted in their skulls, mechanics are remotely linked to the machinery as well as to each other, being able to experience battle through the machines and read the thoughts of other mechanics who are simultaneously jacked in.

After attempting suicide, Julian and his lover, Amelia "Blaze" Harding, are made aware of a problem with an automated particle physics project that could trigger a new Big Bang that would destroy the universe. The pair speculate that a given universe exists only until its first civilization attempts such a project. When Julian, Blaze, and another physicist submit their paper to a journal's review board, they find themselves the target of "The Hammer of God", a Christian cult bent on hastening an anticipated end of the universe. As the Hammer of God has a secret presence throughout the government, Julian and Blaze narrowly miss being assassinated.

Marty Larrin, one of the inventors of jacking technology, recruits Julian and Blaze in an attempt to use the technology to end war; a little-known secret is that jacking with someone else for about two weeks will psychologically eliminate the ability to kill another human being. By "humanizing" the entire world, dangerous technology would not be a problem for human survival. They do so, stop the particle accelerator's construction, and the war is eventually ended.

== Reception ==
- Hugo Award winner, 1998
- Nebula Award winner, 1998
- John W. Campbell Memorial Award winner, 1998
- Locus Award nominee, 1998
