= The Forever War (comics) =

1988 Belgian science fiction graphic novel trilogy drawn by Marvano

- Cover of Volume I.

Publication information
- Publisher: Dupuis (Belgium); NBM Publishing (USA)
Title(s)
Volume 1: Private Mandella
Volume 2: Lieutenant Mandella
Volume 3: Major Mandella
- Formats: Original material for the series has been published as a set of graphic novels.
- Original language: Dutch
- Genre: Military science fiction
- Publication date: 1988
- Number of issues: 3

Creative team
- Writer(s): Joe Haldeman
- Artist(s): Marvano
- Colourist(s): Bruno Marchand

Reprints
- The series has been reprinted, at least in part, in English, French, German, Polish, and Spanish.
- Collected editions
- Volume 1: ISBN 1-56163-004-7
- Volume 2: ISBN 1-56163-025-X
- Volume 3: ISBN 1-56163-045-4
- French omnibus: ISBN 2-8001-2640-X

The Forever War is a 1988 Belgian science fiction graphic novel trilogy drawn by Marvano and closely based on the award-winning The Forever War novel by Joe Haldeman, who has noted that he "supplied all of the dialogue and scripted [the comic] like a movie".

Drawn in the ligne claire style and originally published in Dutch as De Eeuwige Oorlog, it tells the story of William Mandella, an elite soldier fighting for Earth in a centuries-long interstellar war against the 'Taurans'. The series focuses mainly on the dehumanising effects of war and its attendant bureaucracy.

== Themes ==
Staying very faithful to the novel in describing the life of the soldiers and their involvement in various military actions, the graphic novel touches upon themes such as the inhumanity of war (both during combat and in the administration of it) and the change of a society faced with centuries of war footing against an almost totally unseen enemy. Most importantly, it portrays personal experiences of a soldier who, due to pure luck and the Einsteinian time dilation of interstellar travel, fights in and survives the whole length of the war, to end up in a world he does not recognize anymore.

Like the novel, the series is based heavily on Haldeman's experiences in, and thoughts about, the Vietnam War, which are mirrored in the conduct of the military actions and propaganda operations of Earth's military government, especially in its treatment of enemies and the casualties / veterans on its own side. Like its protagonists, the series shows more resignation than outright cynicism at what are depicted as very human failings unchanged throughout history. Haldemann has noted that Marvano managed to include much more of the novel's "first-person ruminations" by Mandella in the graphic novel than the author had originally thought practical.

== Plot synopsis ==
The three volumes of the series span the whole of almost one millennium of war between humanity and the Taurans, an extraterrestrial species that stays enigmatic throughout the series. Due to time dilation, the two main characters experience the whole of the war, biologically appearing to be in their early thirties at the end of the hostilities.

=== Volume 1: Private Mandella ===
The first volume mainly describes the training of the Earth elite force, and their first combat with Taurans, focusing on how military ideology is used to form humans into fighting machines, and in how typical the results end up being.

The story starts on Earth in the early 21st century, where Mandella and about a hundred other young men and women of especially promising physical and mental capabilities have been drafted into a special force designed to combat the extraterrestrial threat. All soldiers are of genius-level IQ, and most have degrees in advanced subjects, such as Mandella, who was studying to become a Doctor of Physics. The Taurans are at this stage almost fully unknown to humanity, except for the apparently unprovoked destruction of some of the first Earth colonization ships sent to another star system - an act witnessed only by an automated drone probe.

Sent out both to gather information and as a show of force to reassure a vengeful Earth population, the force first goes through an extremely grueling training period on Earth and on the planet Cerberus (a fictitious planet beyond Pluto, not the satellite of Pluto which had not been discovered at the time the original novel was written). The exercises involve military and technical training under extreme circumstances and with live weapons, including the use of nuclear weapons and various other advanced armaments. They are designed to make Mandella and his compatriots into the most powerful infantry forces ever, to combat a foe whose physiology is still totally unknown. During a lecture to the soldiers, it is noted that they now know many different ways to kill humans - such as with a shovel blow to the kidneys - but are not even aware if Taurans possess kidneys.

After the training period, during which almost 1 out of 10 is killed in accidents and simulated attacks that are fully accepted by the military as part of a realistic training environment, the already quite chastened military force sets off on their journey to the nearest known Tauran base. Their spaceship journeys via a collapsar-jump, a portal through a black hole-like collapsed star - with the crew knowing that due to relativity time dilation, their journey may feel like it takes several months only, yet decades will go by on Earth before their return.

Eventually arriving at the collapsar 'portal planet' Aleph, many light years away, the force lands near a Tauran planetary base, which remains unaware of their presence. With their small force, the soldiers advance over the foreign planet to eventually reach the base. Activating psychological conditioning that had been implanted earlier, their officers command them to attack the base. Suddenly turned into frenzied, hateful attackers - far different from their much less aggressive and more contemplative normal personalities – the soldiers raze the base and kill all but one Tauran, who successfully escapes the planet.

It later turns out that the Taurans (now for the first time shown as a roughly humanoid species, somewhat in-between a quadrupedal and bipedal species) on the base had been totally unarmed, and that all of the casualties sustained during the firefight were caused by frenzied friendly fire. The realisation that humans had in the recent past done worse things to their own fellow humans - and without psychological conditioning - leads Mandella to a resignatory conclusion about human nature.

=== Volume 2: Lieutenant Mandella ===
The second volume deals with the effects of time dilation on the veterans and on human society involved in the war, as well as with the cold-hearted way in which the military bureaucracy ignores human feelings.

On board of the combat vessel Anniversary, heading out to another collapsar-mission, Mandella and his compatriots, including Marygay Potter, a woman he has become romantically involved with, are attacked by a Tauran cruiser "from the future" – while on a mission involving collapsar jumps, so many decades or even centuries may go by in the rest of the universe that ships from different time periods may end up meeting each other. The consequences are disastrous for Mandella's ship, with a large part of the vessel being destroyed and many of his fellow soldiers dying during the engagement, which is fully fought under computer control as the ship tries to escape new missiles accelerating at several hundred gravities.

Returning to Earth after their combat with the Taurans, the veterans slowly realise how much Earth has changed in the decades since they set out. Friends have grown old beyond their age, parents have died, younger brothers are now much older than they are. Earth's society has also changed strongly, and is now under the control of a militaristic world government leading the fight against the Taurans.

Though feted as heroes, being the first ever soldiers to fight Taurans, Mandella and his compatriots find their sceptical views on the war and on their own military mission edited by all-present censorship - their own complaints during talk shows are digitally replaced by positive, propaganda-inspired comments. Later, when his mother lies dying, Mandella finds that medical services are unavailable for 'Code Zero' people. In the same vein, homosexuality is officially encouraged to also combat overpopulation (some elements of a 'decaying society', such as all-pervasive lawlessness and roving bands of criminals in the countryside - present in the novel - are not depicted in the graphic novels, where the Earth's military government reigns over a more or less subtly oppressed, but apparently quite prosperous society).

Though having left the military, Mandella and many other veterans, including Marygay Potter, by that time his partner, eventually decide to return. Soldier’s life is now the only life they know, and contains the only people from their own time. Earth has changed so much that few things hold them there. They take up offered positions training new recruits on the Moon. However, the military almost immediately breaks its promises - both new lieutenants are transferred to combat roles. During an attack mission on another Tauran base they come under heavy fire while approaching in their shuttles, and are shot down. Both Mandella and Marygay end up having wounded limbs amputated by automatic 'guillotine' systems in their space suits, and only recover in a hospital, shaken and traumatized.

Allowed to recover on Heaven, a hidden colony planet used for the recovery of war veterans, they spend a few brief months of tense bliss while their bodies are regrown. Chronologically over 200 years old, unsure what to do with their future and their growing love for each other, they eventually find that the military has not forgotten them - and is still uncaring about their feelings. Instead of both being assigned to the same force, Marygay is assigned on another collapsar mission, and Mandella to a training battalion, to also eventually lead a different mission. The different locations of their goals - Mandella's mission is to be the greatest series of sequential collapsar jumps ever made - make an eventual reunion almost impossible. On their return they will have aged so differently, that it is unlikely both will be alive - even if they both survive the combat.

Mandella protests about the cold-hearted split the military forces on them, arguing that the recruits he is to train and lead will not be born for a century. He is told that nonetheless, they will be ready for him, and both are sent on their missions. Mandella contemplates committing suicide by jumping from the cliff from where he watches Marygay's spaceship lift off. In the end he decides that he has given the military his life, and will not give them his death as well.

=== Volume 3: Major Mandella ===
Panel from Volume III, German edition. Commodore Antopol sending out fighter craft (lower panel) to intercept the two Tauran cruisers approaching Sade 138.

The third volume concerns itself mainly with the difficulties of a reluctant leader (Mandella) being the officer for a group of soldiers totally estranged from his version of humanity - still human, but genetically engineered and both created and born in vitro. Involving more combat (especially in space) than the other volumes, it also resolves the end of the Terran-Tauran war.

Heading out on the Masaryk (a large Terran cruiser named after the Czech politician Tomáš Garrigue Masaryk of the 20th century), Mandella has now reached a level of command he feels unsuited for due to his remaining pacifist leanings. Also, his troops – genetically engineered individuals born many hundreds of years after his own 21st century – are distrustful of him and his heterosexual nature (Earth having long since made homosexuality the norm, originally for population control), which they perceive as barbaric.

After over 350 years of absolute travel time, the ship arrives near the portal planet Sade 138. The infantry force that Mandella commands builds a military base on the surface and settles in. However, boredom soon starts, and tensions come to a head when one of the soldiers attacks Mandella with a knife during a court martial hearing. Mandella survives by virtue of quick reflexes and long training - but is now faced with the difficulty of making a command decision: Should he execute the soldier for attacking his officer, or can he show leniency without losing the remaining respect of his charges? He is saved from the hard decision by an 'accident' during medical treatment of the soldier (it is implied that his medical officer, Diana Alsever, took the decision into her own hands) and then by a Tauran attack on the Solar System.

The Taurans are soon engaged in a running battle with the Terran space forces, while the infantry watches helplessly from their planetary bunkers. With the deadly ballet of space combat unfolding, the grim realities of war are exemplified by a computer screen shown calculating the Terran survival chances, underlined by the note:

"These figures assume that you are willing to sacrifice all your fighters." The fighters are manned.

One of the two Tauran cruisers is overwhelmed later in the fight, while troopships drop Tauran soldiers to engage the human forces on the ground. The second Tauran cruiser eventually manages to overwhelm the Masaryk's defenses with missiles. Knowing they are doomed, the commander of the Terran cruiser decides on a kamikaze mission by having her ship detonate close to the remaining Tauran cruiser. This in turn leads to the Tauran ship impacting on the tiny planet, causing extreme earthquake shocks, above 9 on the Richter magnitude scale.

Mandella and some of his troops survive only by taking refuge in a stasis field device which slows down all movement to a crawl, including that of all energy – and thus makes them immune to all modern weapons and most outside forces. However, the Taurans have encountered the device before, and enter the stasis bubble with melee weapons, leading to a short fight with the similarly armed humans - a reduction to archaic fighting methods unseen for millennia.

Eventually, the humans remove one of their nuclear weapons from the shuttle and detonate it just outside their field, destroying the remaining aliens outside. A few days later, they shut off the stasis field - in the middle of a giant thermonuclear crater, they are the only living beings left in the Solar System. Yet thankfully, an emergency shuttle left behind by the Masaryk before her demise, enables them to return home.

Arriving centuries later at Stargate, a large asteroid used as the main human staging base for the war, the veterans find it almost deserted. It turns out that in their absence, the war has ended, and the two species are now living in mutual, total peace. The war ended only after human soldiers had been evolved into clones - allowing first meaningful contact with the Taurans, who turned out to be a natural group consciousness clone species (an idea further explored in the sequel trilogy).

The whole war turns out to have been a mistake and a misunderstanding. Mandella is deeply shocked by the developments, and also by the change in his own species - which has evolved into a joined group consciousness with the Taurans, lacking true individualism. While Mandella has never developed any real hate for the Taurans, this is depicted as an at least faintly sad ending to his, and humanity's, journey. He is finally, totally, an outcast.

Robbed of his last purpose, war, he however finds out that Marygay has also survived the fighting, having returned hundreds of years before, as predicted. However, instead of dying in the meantime, she has used the funds accumulated during centuries of duty to purchase an old spaceship to use as a 'time capsule' to wait for him, via continual time dilation travel. Mandella is finally reunited with her and several other veterans and relocates to Middle Finger, the only planet in the universe where humans are still allowed to live the type of life they did before the war, as individuals, conceiving and raising children in the old-fashioned way.

== Sequels ==
The comic series was well received, and has spawned a follow-up trilogy series ('A New Beginning') set in the same universe, mainly after the war has finished. It is told primarily from the viewpoint of Marygay Potter, one of the main characters of the original comic trilogy. Unlike the first trilogy, this series is not directly based on the original novel (taking place mainly several decades after the end of the Forever War and the arrival of the veterans on Index), though it is strongly connected to the follow-up novel Forever Free, and the novella A Separate War, describing the time of separation between the two main characters from Marygay's perspective. It is also heavier on metaphysical themes and features combat only rarely except in the first volume, during Marygay's last combat mission in the war. The Forever War comics were reprinted in 2017 and A New Beginning was reprinted in 2018 as The Forever War: Forever Free.

== Translations ==
The series has been translated into Czech (Věčná válka) by Crew, English (The Forever War) by NBM Publishing, French (La Guerre Eternelle) by Dupuis, German (Der Ewige Krieg), Polish (Wieczna wojna), Italian (La Guerra Eterna) and Spanish (La Guerra Interminable). A new English translation was published by Titan Comics in 2017 with a translation of A New Beginning being published from April 2018 under the title Forever Free.

- Volume 1 (46 pages, French, Dupuis, 2001, ISBN 2-8001-1629-3; English, NBM Publishing, 1990, ISBN 0-918348-95-1, 1991, ISBN 1-56163-004-7)
- Volume 2 (52 pages, French, Dupuis, 2001, ISBN 2-8001-1664-1; English, NBM Publishing, 1994, ISBN 1-56163-025-X)
- Volume 3 (44 pages, French, Dupuis, 2001, ISBN 2-8001-2640-X; English, NBM Publishing, 1994, ISBN 1-56163-045-4)

Dupuis has also collected the three books into one 165-page volume (2002, ISBN 2-8001-2640-X). This was published in English by Titan Comics in 2017.

The sequel trilogy (Een Nieuw Begin - A New Beginning), was translated into French (Libre à Jamais), Polish (Wieczna wolność) and Italian (Missione eterna).
