= Joe Haldeman =

American science fiction writer (born 1943)

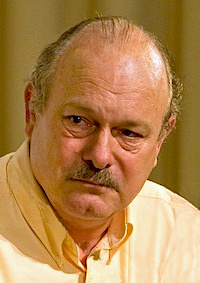
- Haldeman at Finncon 2007
- Born: Joe William Haldeman; June 9, 1943 (age 83); Oklahoma City, Oklahoma, U.S.
- Education: University of Maryland (BS)
- Occupation: Writer
- Spouse: Mary Gay Potter (m. 1965)
- Relatives: Jack C. Haldeman II, brother
- Writing career
- Pen name: Robert Graham
- Period: 1972–2015
- Genre: Science fiction
- Notable work: The Forever War
- Movement: Military sci-fi
- Website: joehaldeman.com

Joe William Haldeman (born June 9, 1943) is an American science fiction author and former college professor. He is best known for his novel The Forever War (1974), which was inspired by his experiences as a combat soldier in the Vietnam War. That novel and other works, including The Hemingway Hoax (1991) and Forever Peace (1997), have won science fiction awards, including the Hugo Award and Nebula Award. He received the SFWA Grand Master for career achievements. In 2012, he was inducted as a member of the Science Fiction Hall of Fame. From 1983 to 2014, he was a professor teaching writing at the Massachusetts Institute of Technology (MIT).

== Life ==
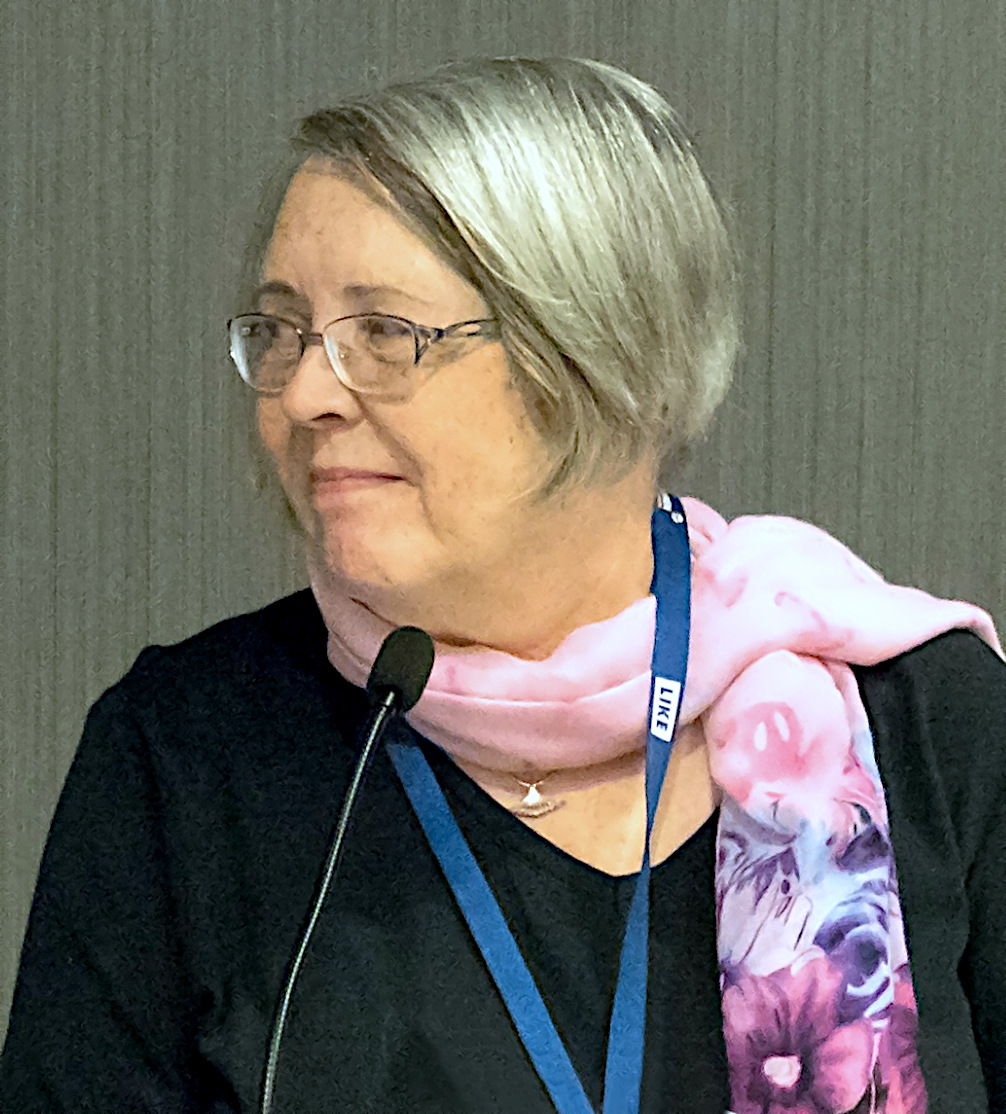
Gay Haldeman at Worldcon 75 in Helsinki in 2017

Haldeman was born in Oklahoma City, Oklahoma. His father was Jack Carroll Haldeman, who was a career officer in the United States Public Health Service and he lived in Puerto Rico, New Orleans, Washington, D.C., Bethesda (Maryland) and Anchorage (Alaska) as a child. He had to repeatedly start classes as a new kid in local schools.

In 1965, Haldeman married Mary Gay Potter, known as Gay Haldeman. He received a Bachelor of Science degree in Physics and Astronomy from the University of Maryland in 1967.

He was immediately drafted into the United States Army. Serving as a combat engineer in the Vietnam War, he was wounded in combat and received a Purple Heart. He struggled to adjust to civilian life after returning home. His wartime experience inspired his debut novel, War Year; his later novels such as The Hemingway Hoax and The Forever War, continued to explore the experience of soldiers in wartime and after returning home.

In 1975, he received a Master of Fine Arts degree in Creative Writing from the University of Iowa Writers' Workshop.

Haldeman has resided alternately in Gainesville, Florida, and Cambridge, Massachusetts. From 1983 until his retirement in 2014, he was an adjunct professor of writing at the Massachusetts Institute of Technology (MIT). He set his 2007 novel, The Accidental Time Machine at MIT. Haldeman is also a painter.

In 2009 and 2010, Haldeman was hospitalized for pancreatitis.

== Work ==
Haldeman's first book was a 122-page novel, War Year, published by Holt, Rinehart and Winston in May 1972. The novel was sold with the help of fellow writer Ben Bova. It was based on his letters home from Vietnam and was marketed as mainstream and young adult. His most famous novel is his second, The Forever War (St. Martin's Press, 1974), which was inspired by his Vietnam experiences and originated as his MFA thesis for the Iowa Writers' Workshop. It won the year's "Best Novel" Hugo, Nebula and Locus Awards. He later wrote sequels.

In 1975, two Attar novels were published as Pocket Books paperback originals under the pen name Robert Graham. Haldeman also wrote two of the earliest original novels based on the 1960s Star Trek television series universe, Planet of Judgment (August 1977) and World Without End (February 1979).

In a college creative writing class in 1967, Haldeman wrote the first two SF stories which he (later) sold. "Out of Phase" was published in the September 1969 Galaxy magazine, and "the other worked its way down to a penny-a-word market, Amazing Stories, and netted me all of $15 – but then years later it was adapted for The Twilight Zone, for fifty times as much. Not bad for a story banged out overnight to meet a class deadline."

Haldeman has written at least one produced Hollywood movie script. The film, a low-budget science fiction film called Robot Jox, was released in 1990. He was not entirely happy with the product, saying "to me it's as if I'd had a child who started out well and then sustained brain damage".

In a 2016 interview, Haldeman said, "Jack of all trades, master of none I think. It's a way to go. Not all writers go that way, but many of them do. On a day-to-day basis I wake up in the morning and I can do anything I feel like doing. I don't say, uh oh, I've gotta get back to that damn novel again. I can always write a poem or something. ... "

== Major awards ==
Haldeman at Worldcon 2026

The Science Fiction Writers of America officers and past presidents selected Haldeman as the 27th SFWA Grand Master in 2009, and he received the corresponding Damon Knight Memorial Grand Master Award for lifetime achievement as a writer during Nebula Awards weekend in 2010. The Science Fiction Hall of Fame inducted him in June 2012.

He has also won numerous annual awards for particular works.

He is a lifetime member of the Science Fiction and Fantasy Writers of America (SFWA), and past president.

His filk song "The Ballad of Stan Long (a sexist epic)" received a Pegasus Award in 2005.

He received the Inkpot Award in 1991.

=== Hugo Award ===
- The Forever War (1976) – novel
- "Tricentennial" (1977) – short story
- The Hemingway Hoax (1991) – novella
- "None So Blind" (1995) – short story
- Forever Peace (1998) – novel

=== John W. Campbell Memorial Award for Best Science Fiction Novel ===
- Forever Peace (1998)

=== Nebula Award ===
- The Forever War (1975) – novel
- The Hemingway Hoax (1990) – novella
- "Graves" (1993) – short story
- Forever Peace (1998) – novel
- Camouflage (2004) – novel

=== Locus Award ===
- The Forever War (1976) – SF novel
- None So Blind (1995) Locus Award for Best Short Story
- None So Blind (1997) Locus Award for Best Collection

=== Rhysling Award ===
- "Saul's Death" (1984) – long poem
- "Eighteen Years Old, October Eleventh" (1991) – short poem
- "January Fires" (2001) – long poem

=== World Fantasy Award ===
- "Graves" (1993) – Short Fiction

=== James Tiptree, Jr. Award ===
- Camouflage (2004)

=== Pegasus Award ===
- "The Ballad of Stan Long (a sexist epic)" (2005) – Best Space Opera Song

== Bibliography ==
=== Non-series novels ===
- War Year (1972) – nongenre Vietnam War novel, hardcover and paperback endings differ
- Mindbridge (1976) – Hugo nominee, placed second in annual Locus Poll
- All My Sins Remembered (1977)
- There Is No Darkness (1983) – cowritten with Jack C. Haldeman II
- Tool of the Trade (1987)
- Buying Time (1989) – published in the UK as The Long Habit of Living
- The Hemingway Hoax (1990)
- 1968 (1994) (novel) – Vietnam War novel
- The Coming (2000) – Locus SF nominee, 2001
- Guardian (2002)
- Camouflage (2004) – Nebula Award winner, 2005
- Old Twentieth (2005)
- The Accidental Time Machine (2007) – Nebula Award nominee, 2007; placed fifth in annual Locus Poll
- Work Done for Hire (2014)

=== Forever War series ===
- The Forever War (1974) (Nebula Award winner, 1975; Hugo and Locus Awards winner, 1976)
- "A Separate War" (1999, short story; appeared first in 1999 in the anthology Far Horizons; collected in 2006 in War Stories and A Separate War and Other Stories. The story of Marygay Potter after she parts with William Mandella in The Forever War.)
- Forever Free (1999) (a direct sequel to the first novel)

=== Attar (the Merman) series ===
- Attar's Revenge (1975) (published under the pseudonym Robert Graham)
- War of Nerves (1975) (published under the pseudonym Robert Graham)

=== Star Trek novels ===
- Planet of Judgment (1977)
- World Without End (1979)

=== Worlds series ===
- Worlds (1981)
- Worlds Apart (1983)
- Worlds Enough and Time (1992)

=== Forever Peace series ===
- Forever Peace (1997) (Nebula Award winner, 1998; John W. Campbell Memorial Award for Best Science Fiction Novel winner, 1998; Hugo Awards winner, 1998) (while thematically linked to Haldeman's The Forever War series, Forever Peace is not set in the same universe)
- "Forever Bound" (2010, short story; appears in the anthology Warriors) (a prequel to Forever Peace, it tells the story of Julian Class being drafted and trained as a soldierboy while falling in love with Carolyn)

=== Marsbound trilogy ===
- Marsbound (2008) (also serialized in Analog Science Fiction and Fact) – placed fifth in annual Locus Poll)
- Starbound (2010)
- Earthbound (2011)

=== Short fiction collections ===
- Infinite Dreams (1978)
- Dealing in Futures (1985)
- Vietnam and Other Alien Worlds (1993)
- None So Blind (1996)
- A Separate War and Other Stories (2006)
- The Best of Joe Haldeman (2013)

=== Anthologies edited ===
- Cosmic Laughter (1974)
- Study War No More (1977)
- Nebula Award Stories Seventeen (1983)
- Body Armor: 2000 (1986) (with Charles G. Waugh and Martin H. Greenberg)
- Supertanks (1987) (with Charles G. Waugh and Martin H. Greenberg)
- Space-Fighters (1988) (with Charles G. Waugh and Martin H. Greenberg)
- Future Weapons of War (2007) (with Martin H. Greenberg)

=== Comics ===
- The Forever War drawn by Mark van Oppen (better known as Marvano) (original edition La Guerre éternelle (1988–1989))
- Forever Free drawn by Marvano (original edition Libre à jamais (2002))
- Dallas Barr drawn by Marvano based on Buying Time (1996–2005)

=== Poetry ===
Collections

- Saul's Death and Other Poems. 1997.

List of poems

Title	Year	First published	Reprinted/collected
Rounder	2013	Haldeman, Joe (March 2013). "Rounder". Asimov's Science Fiction. 37 (3): 105.	
Ecopoiesis (NIAC Symposium 2015)	2015	Haldeman, Joe (November 2015). "Ecopoiesis (NIAC Symposium 2015)". Analog Science Fiction and Fact. 135 (11): 59.	
