= Forever Free (novel) =

1999 science fiction novel by Joe Haldeman

- First edition
- Author: Joe Haldeman
- Cover artist: Bruce Jensen
- Language: English
- Series: The Forever War series
- Genre: Science fiction novel
- Publisher: Ace Books
- Publication date: 1999
- Publication place: United States
- Media type: Print (hardback & paperback)
- Pages: 277
- ISBN: 978-1-85798-931-1
- Preceded by: Forever Peace (1997)

Forever Free is a science fiction novel by American author Joe Haldeman, the sequel to The Forever War. It was published in 1999.

== Plot summary ==
William Mandella, protagonist of The Forever War, lives with his wife Marygay on the icy world Middle Finger, a planet of the Mizar system. Dissatisfied with the state of their society, they eventually decide to jump forward in time, using the time dilation of interstellar travel. Their intention is to travel for 10 subjective years, at relativistic speeds, into the future, during which 40,000 Earth years will have passed on Middle Finger. They, along with other Forever War veterans and other disenchanted humans on Middle Finger, hope that whatever they will find upon their return will be more to their liking. This requires the consent of the posthuman group mind now known as 'Man', and of the alien group mind Tauran race. When permission is denied, William and allies hijack the ship. One Man and one Tauran join the journey.

After Marygay and William head away from their planet, a series of unexplained occurrences happen and the ship starts to lose antimatter mysteriously. They abandon the ship and return home. Instead of the intended 40,000 years, they have only been away 24 Earth years. Upon arrival, they find the planet still intact, but seemingly vacant; everyone having literally disappeared at the same time as the incident on their ship. They then return to Earth, and realize that all other humans, Man and Taurans have disappeared, but robots and wildlife remain.

On Earth, a shape-shifting being, an Omni, reveals itself. This being has been on Earth and the other inhabited planets for millennia and is not certain of its own origin. The Omni reveals that its race had given the humans and Taurans language and controlled their level of technology, but did not know what caused recent mass disappearances. The Omni and the lone surviving Tauran discuss the possibility of 'nameless' beings causing the unexplainable phenomena. Meanwhile, more Omni appear, but some of the remaining humans and other Omni spontaneously explode inexplicably. The Omni conclude that William and Marygay provoked the 'nameless' and must convince the 'nameless' to leave the universe alone.

Then, the 'nameless' appears—a god who evidently created the universe as an experiment to observe. The god compares the action of William's group leaving the galaxy on a 40,000-year round-trip as similar to a laboratory mouse escaping its cage, prompting it to take drastic action. The god announces its control over physics, life, death, and ability to time travel. The god discusses timelines as not linear, but an infinite "table" of possible events, reveals the existence of other "tables", but declines to answer if there is a higher power above them. The god declares this experiment "over", declaring that it would leave for another galaxy and only return to observe resultant events in 1,000,000 years. The god departs, returning to life the exploded beings, and restoring the vanished beings, whom the god stored in stasis.

After the god's departure, the Omni peacefully reveal themselves to humanity, Man and the Taurans, and all worked together to overcome the detrimental effects caused by the mass disappearance. Religion was strengthened due to proof of a god, while science required rechecking of fundamental laws and universal constants, with the god having altered the speed of light. William and Marygay return to live on Middle Finger, reuniting with their son Bill.

== Reception ==
F&SF reviewer Charles de Lint praised the novel, declaring "Forever Free is everything good science fiction should be but so often isn't: a grand adventure into what it means to be human, told through rich characterization and thoughtful scientific (not to mention religious) speculation that doesn't lag for a moment." Kirkus Reviews panned the book as a "belated, and truly terrible, sequel" to The Forever War.

== See also ==
- Simulated reality
