= The Forever War =

1974 military science fiction novel by Joe Haldeman

- Cover of first edition (hardcover)
- Author: Joe Haldeman
- Language: English
- Genre: Military science fiction
- Publisher: St. Martin's Press
- Publication date: 1974
- Publication place: United States
- Media type: Print (hardback & paperback)
- Pages: 236
- Awards: Nebula Award for Best Novel (1975); Locus Award for Best Novel (1976); Hugo Award for Best Novel (1976)
- ISBN: 0-312-29890-0
- Followed by: Forever Free

The Forever War is a 1974 military science fiction novel by American author Joe Haldeman, telling the contemplative story about human soldiers fighting an interstellar war against an alien civilization known as the Taurans. It won the Nebula Award for Best Novel in 1975 and the Hugo and Locus awards in 1976. The book was the first use of the term "forever war". Forever Free (1999) and Forever Peace (1997) are, respectively, direct and thematic sequel novels. The novella A Separate War (1999) is another sequel of sorts, occurring simultaneously with the final portion of The Forever War. Informally, the novels comprise The Forever War series; the novel also inspired a comic book and a board game. The Forever War is the first title in the SF Masterworks series.

== Plot summary ==
William Mandella is a physics student conscripted for an elite task force in the United Nations Exploratory Force being assembled for a war against the Taurans, an alien species discovered when they apparently attacked human colonists' ships. The UNEF ground troops are sent out for reconnaissance and revenge. The elite recruits have IQs of 150 and above, are highly educated, healthy, and fit. Training is grueling – first on Earth and later on a planet called "Charon" beyond Pluto. (Note: Not Pluto's moon Charon, which had yet to be discovered) Several of the recruits die during training due to the extreme environments and the use of live weapons. The new soldiers complete training and immediately depart for action via connected "collapsars" that allow ships to cover thousands of light-years in a split second. Crucially, traveling to and from the collapsars at near-lightspeed has enormous relativistic time effects.

On their first encounter with Taurans, on a planet orbiting Epsilon Aurigae, their post-hypnotic training is triggered, which causes them to massacre the Taurans despite their lack of resistance. This first expedition, beginning in 1997, lasts only two years from the soldiers' point of view but due to time dilation, they return to Earth in 2024. During the expedition's second battle, the soldiers experience future shock first-hand, as the Taurans have much more advanced weaponry. Mandella, with fellow soldier and lover Marygay Potter, returns to civilian life, only to find humanity drastically changed. He and the other discharged soldiers have difficulty fitting into a society that has altered almost beyond their comprehension. The veterans learn that, to curb overpopulation, which led to class wars around the world caused by inequitable rationing, homosexuality has become officially encouraged by many of the world's nations. The world has become a very dangerous place due to mass unemployment and the easy availability of weapons. Alienated, Mandella and many other veterans re-enlist, despite the extremely high casualty rate and their recognition that the military is a soulless construct. Mandella and Potter receive promised postings as instructors on Luna, but upon arrival are immediately reassigned to a combat command.

Almost entirely through luck, Mandella survives four years of military service, while several centuries elapse for humanity. He soon becomes the objectively oldest surviving soldier in the war, attaining high rank through seniority rather than ambition. He and Potter (who is his last link with the Earth of his youth) are eventually given different assignments, meaning that even if they both survive the war they will likely never meet again due to time dilation. After briefly contemplating suicide, Mandella assumes the post of commanding officer of a "strike force", commanding soldiers who speak a language largely unrecognizable to him, whose ethnicity is now nearly uniform ('vaguely Polynesian' in appearance) and who are exclusively homosexual. He is disliked by his soldiers and he assumes this is because they had to learn 21st century English to communicate with him and other senior staff and because he is heterosexual.

Engaging in combat thousands of light–years away from Earth, Mandella and his soldiers need to resort to medieval weapons to fight inside a stasis field which neutralizes all electromagnetic radiation in anything not covered with a protective coating. Upon return, the strike force learns this is the last battle of the war. Humanity has begun to clone itself, resulting in a new, collective species calling itself simply Man. Man is able to communicate with the Taurans, who are also clones. It is discovered that the war started due to a misunderstanding; the colony ships were lost to accidents and those on Earth with a vested interest in a new war used these disappearances as an excuse to begin the conflict. The futile, meaningless war, which had lasted for more than a thousand years, ends.

Man has established several colonies of old-style, heterosexual humans, just in case the evolutionary change proves to be a mistake. Mandella travels to one of these colonies (named "Middle Finger" in the definitive version of the novel) where he is reunited with Potter, who had been discharged much earlier and had taken trips in space to use time dilation to age at a much slower rate, hoping for Mandella's return. The epilogue is a news item from the year 3143 announcing the birth of a "fine baby boy" to Marygay Potter-Mandella.

== Reception and interpretation ==
The novel is widely perceived to be a portrayal of the author's military service during the Vietnam War, and has been called an account of his war experiences written through a space opera filter. Other hints of the autobiographical nature of the work are the protagonist's surname, Mandella, which is a near-anagram of the author's surname; Mandella being a physics student, like Haldeman, as well as the name of the lead female character, Marygay Potter, which is nearly identical to Haldeman's wife's maiden name. If one accepts this reading of the book, the alienation experienced by the soldiers on returning to Earth – here caused by the time dilation effect – becomes a metaphor for the reception given to US troops returning to the United States from Vietnam, including the way in which the war ultimately proves useless and its result meaningless. He also subverts typical space opera clichés (such as the heroic soldier influencing battles through individual acts) and "demonstrates how absurd many of the old clichés look to someone who had seen real combat duty".

=== Connection to Starship Troopers ===
Haldeman has stated that The Forever War is a result of his experiences in the Vietnam War, although he has also said that he was influenced by Robert Heinlein's Starship Troopers. Haldeman said that he disagreed with Starship Troopers because it "glorifies war" but added that "it's a very well-crafted novel and I believe Heinlein was honest with it".

The Forever War contains several parallels to Starship Troopers, including its setting and the powered armor that Heinlein's novel first popularized. Commentators have described it as a reaction to Heinlein's novel, a suggestion Haldeman denies; the two novels are different in terms of their attitude towards the military. The Forever War does not depict war as a noble pursuit, with the sides clearly defined as good and evil; instead, the novel explores the dehumanizing effect of war, influenced by the real-world context of the Vietnam War.

Heinlein wrote a letter to Haldeman, congratulating Haldeman on his Nebula Award; Haldeman has said that Heinlein's letter "meant more than the award itself". According to author Spider Robinson, Heinlein approached Haldeman at the awards banquet and said the book "may be the best future war story I've ever read!"

== Editions ==
The Forever War was originally written as Haldeman's MFA thesis for the Iowa Writer's Workshop. It was first published as a serial in Analog Magazine before its first book publication in 1974. Since then, many editions of The Forever War have been published. Editions published prior to 1991 were abridged for space by the original editor (omitting the middle section, a novella titled You Can Never Go Back). These early paperback editions have "a white cover showing a man in a spacesuit with a sword, with symbolic clocks all around", according to the author, with alternatively the first hardcover edition featuring a large hourglass with planets falling through it.

The 1991 edition restored many expurgated sections, primarily dealing with the changes that befall human civilization over the course of William Mandella's life. This version's cover "has a futuristic soldier who looks like Robin Williams in a funny hat", as Haldeman notes, "But alas, not all of the changes got in, and the book has some internal contradictions because of things left over from the [earlier version]."

In 1997, Avon published the version that Haldeman called "definitive", with "everything restored" and "a less funny cover illustration". This version was republished twice, first in October 2001 as a hardback with a cover showing spaceships in battle over a planet, and again in September 2003, with the cover art depicting a device worn over the eye of a soldier.

In 1999, it was republished by Millennium, an imprint of the Orion Publishing Group, as part of the SF Masterworks series. It featured as the first novel re-printed in the series, and the cover shows a close-up of Marygay Potter with soldiers and spaceships in the background. This is the same version as the 1997 Avon publication and has the same Author's Note.

In 1999, Haldeman, at the request of Robert Silverberg, wrote Marygay's first-person account of her time of separation from Mandella. It included not only the military details but also the difficulty of coping as a lone heterosexual woman with a society where same-sex relations are the inflexible norm. The story was included in Silverberg's anthology Far Horizons (1999), and later was the title story in the collection of Haldeman stories A Separate War and Other Stories (2006). In his "Notes on the Stories" for that collection, Haldeman commented that "it was fun to write her story, both as a bridge to the sequel (Forever Free) and as an oblique commentary on The Forever War, twenty years later."

In 2006, an omnibus edition containing the books Forever War, Forever Free, and Forever Peace (under the title Peace and War) was published by Gollancz. The cover depicts a futuristic gun barrel stuck into the ground with a smashed spacesuit helmet placed on top, a science-fiction version of a battlefield cross. The author's note at the start of the book describes the edition as containing the definitive versions. The most recent print edition was released in 2009 (ISBN 978-0-31-253663-3) with an additional foreword by John Scalzi. The cover art depicts a soldier in a spacesuit in a jungle environment. Haldeman describes it as "the definitive version" in the author's note preceding the text of the novel. An ebook version was released in July 2011 by Ridan Publishing and also contained the foreword by Scalzi and introductions by Haldeman and Robin Sullivan (President of Ridan Publishing). The cover art depicts a soldier in a war-torn setting looking down at the helmet of a fallen comrade.

== Adaptations ==
=== Stage play ===
Stuart Gordon adapted the novel for Chicago's Organic Theater Company in 1983, in part as a reaction to what Gordon considered the "ultra-sanitized video game" style Star Wars brought to science fiction. The play starred Bruce A. Young as William Mandella.

=== Game ===
Mayfair Games published a board game based on the novel in 1983.

=== Graphic novel ===
Belgian comic artist Marvano has, in cooperation with Haldeman, created a graphic novel trilogy of The Forever War. With some very minor changes and omissions to storyline and setting, it faithfully adapts the same themes in visual style. The series was translated into various languages, and had a follow-up trilogy connected to Forever Free.

=== Film ===
In 1988, Richard Edlund (who won Visual Effects Oscars for Star Wars, The Empire Strikes Back, Raiders of the Lost Ark, and Return of the Jedi) began to option the rights to The Forever War. In October 1994, he bought the rights to the property. In 2008, he optioned the rights to Ridley Scott, who announced that, after a 25-year wait for the rights to become available, he was making a return to science fiction with a film adaptation of The Forever War. In March 2009, Scott stated that the film would be in 3D, citing James Cameron's Avatar as an inspiration for doing so. In the summer of 2010, Scott revealed that State of Play writer Matthew Michael Carnahan was currently on the fourth draft of a screenplay originally written by David Peoples. In May 2015, following the apparent expiration of a development agreement with 20th Century Fox and Scott Free, Warner Bros. won the rights to the novel and planned to develop the project with writer Jon Spaihts and with Channing Tatum in a starring role.
