= Robert Silverberg bibliography =

List of works by Robert Silverberg

List of the published work of Robert Silverberg (b. 1935), American science fiction author and editor. A complete list would include over 500 books.

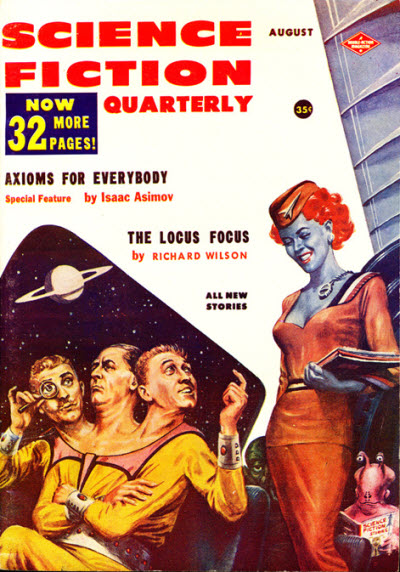
Writing as "Calvin M. Knox", Silverberg provided "En Route to Earth", the cover story on the August 1957 issue of Science Fiction Quarterly

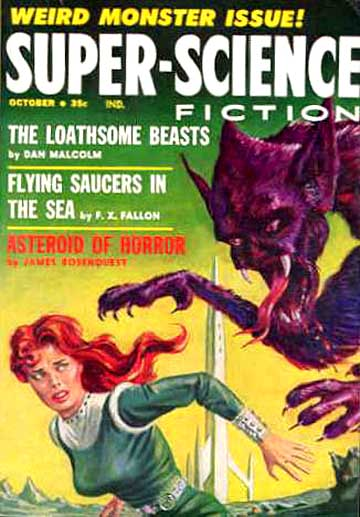
Silverberg wrote "The Loathsome Beasts", the cover story for the final issue of Super-Science Fiction, under his "Dan Malcolm" pseudonym

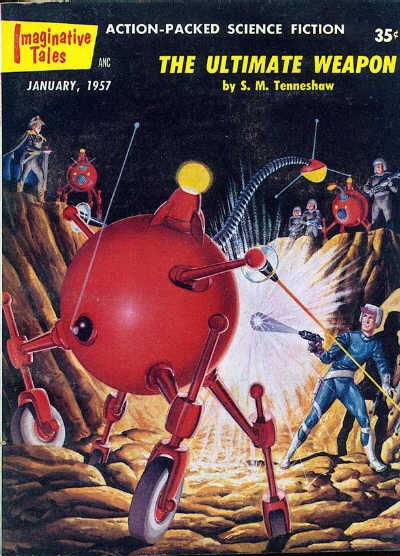
Under the "S. M. Tenneshaw" house name, Silverberg and Randall Garrett wrote "The Ultimate Weapon" for Imaginative Tales

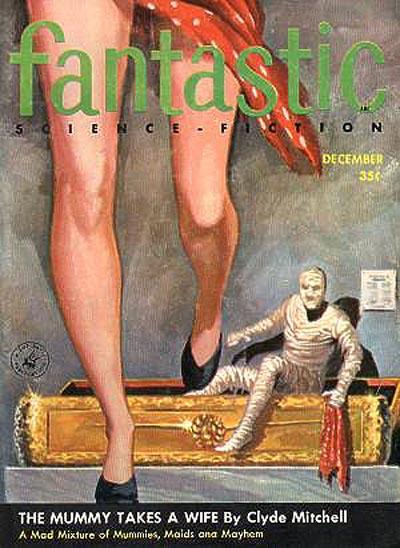
Under the "Clyde Mitchell" house name, Silverberg and Randall Garrett wrote "The Mummy Takes a Wife" for Fantastic

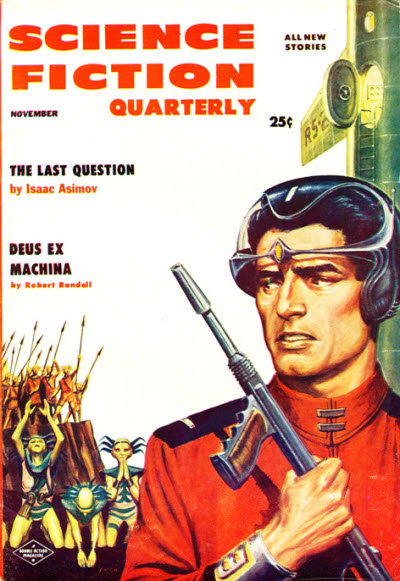
Another Silverberg-Garrett collaboration, "Deus Ex Machina", credited to "Robert Randall", took the cover of the November 1956 issue of Science Fiction Quarterly

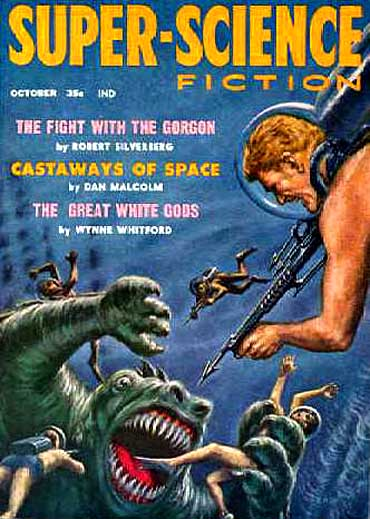
Silverberg's "The Fight with the Gorgon" took the cover of the October 1958 issue of Super-Science Fiction

== Novels ==
=== Series ===
Nidorian

1. The Shrouded Planet (1957), with Randall Garrett, as Robert Randall
2. The Dawning Light (1959), with Randall Garrett, as Robert Randall

Regan

1. Regan's Planet (1964)
2. World's Fair 1992 (1970)

Majipoor (Note: The short story collection Tales of Majipoor is also part of the Majipoor series.)

1. Lord Valentine Cycle: (Note: The short story collection Majipoor Chronicles is also part of the Lord Valentine Cycle.)
  1. Lord Valentine's Castle (1980)
  2. Valentine Pontifex (1983)
2. The Mountains of Majipoor (1995)
3. Lord Prestimion Cycle (prequel):
  1. Sorcerers of Majipoor (1997)
  2. Lord Prestimion (1999)
  3. The King of Dreams (2001)

Gilgamesh

1. Gilgamesh the King (1984)
2. To the Land of the Living (1989)

New Springtime (Note: The short story "A Piece of the Great World" is also part of the New Springtime series.)

1. At Winter's End (1988)
2. The New Springtime (1990)

=== Standalone novels ===
- Revolt on Alpha C (1955)
- The 13th Immortal (1957)
- Master of Life and Death (1957)
- Invaders from Earth (1958)
- Lest We Forget Thee, Earth (1958), as Calvin M. Knox
- Stepsons of Terra (1958)
- Aliens from Space (1958), as David Osborne
- Invisible Barriers (1958), as David Osborne
- Starhaven Avalon (1958), as Ivar Jorgenson
- Starman's Quest (1958), revised version 1969
- Recalled to Life (1958), revised version 1972
- The Plot Against Earth (1959), as Calvin M. Knox
- The Planet Killers (1959)
- Lost Race of Mars (1960)
- The Hot Beat (1960), as Stan Vincent
- Collision Course (1961)
- The Seed of Earth (1962)
- Blood on the Mink (1962), first published as "Too Much Blood on the Mink"
- The Judge's Mistress (1962), as Dan Malcolm
- The Silent Invaders (1963)
- Time of the Great Freeze (1964)
- One of Our Asteroids Is Missing (1964), as Calvin M. Knox
- Conquerors from the Darkness (1965)
- The Mask of Akhnaten (1965)
- The Gate of Worlds (1967)
- Thorns (1967), Nebula Award nominee, 1967; Hugo Award nominee, 1968
- Those Who Watch (1967)
- The Time Hoppers (1967)
- To Open the Sky (1967)
- Hawksbill Station (1968)
- The Masks of Time (1968), Nebula Award nominee, 1968
- The Man in the Maze (1969)
- Nightwings (1969)
- Across a Billion Years (1969)
- Three Survived (1969)
- To Live Again (1969)
- Up the Line (1969), Nebula Award nominee, 1969; Hugo Award nominee, 1970
- Downward to the Earth (1970), Locus SF Award nominee, 1971
- Tower of Glass (1970), Nebula Award nominee, 1970; Hugo and Locus SF Award nominee, 1971
- Son of Man (1971)
- The Second Trip (1971)
- The World Inside (1971), Hugo Award nominee, 1972
- A Time of Changes (1971), Silverberg's first Nebula Award winner, 1972; Hugo and Locus SF Awards nominee, 1972
- The Book of Skulls (1971), Nebula Award nominee, 1972; Hugo and Locus SF Awards nominee, 1973
- Dying Inside (1972), Nebula Award nominee, 1972; Hugo and Locus SF Awards nominee, 1973
- The Stochastic Man (1975), Nebula Award nominee, 1975; Hugo, Locus SF, and John W. Campbell Memorial Awards nominee, 1976
- Shadrach in the Furnace (1976), Hugo Award nominee, 1977
- Lord of Darkness (1983)
- Tom O'Bedlam (1985)
- Star of Gypsies (1986)
- Project Pendulum (1987)
- The Mutant Season (1989), with Karen Haber
- Nightfall (1990), expansion of the 1941 novelette "Nightfall" by Isaac Asimov
- The Face of the Waters (1991)
- Child of Time (1991), also published as The Ugly Little Boy, expansion of the 1958 novelette "The Ugly Little Boy" by Isaac Asimov
- Kingdoms of the Wall (1992)
- The Positronic Man (1992), expansion of the 1976 novelette "The Bicentennial Man" by Isaac Asimov
- Hot Sky at Midnight (1994)
- Starborne (1996)
- The Alien Years (1998), Locus SF Award nominee, 1999
- The Longest Way Home (2002)
- Roma Eterna (2003)

=== Omnibus editions ===
- Times Three (2011)

- Hawksbill Station
- Up the Line
- Project Pendulum

- Among Strangers (2022)

- Those Who Watch
- The Man in the Maze
- Tom O'Bedlam
- The Way to Spook City

== Short fiction ==
=== Novellas (selection) ===
- Planet of Death (1967)
- Hawksbill Station (1968), Nebula and Hugo Awards nominee, 1968
- Nightwings (1969), Nebula Award nominee, 1969; Hugo Award winner, 1969
- Born with the Dead (1974), Nebula and Locus Awards winner, 1975; Hugo Award nominee, 1975
- Homefaring (1982), Hugo and Nebula Awards nominee, 1984
- Sailing to Byzantium (1985), Nebula Award winner, 1986; Hugo Award nominee, 1986
- Gilgamesh in the Outback (1986), Nebula Award nominee, 1987; Hugo Award winner, 1987
- The Secret Sharer (1987), Nebula and Hugo Awards nominee, 1988; Locus Award winner, 1988
- Lion Time in Timbuctoo (1990)
- Letters from Atlantis (1990)
- Thebes of the Hundred Gates (1992)
- The Last Song of Orpheus (2010)

=== Collections ===
- Campus Hellcat (1960)
- Illicit Affair and Other Stories (1961)
- Next Stop, the Stars (1962)
- Godling, Go Home (1964)
- To Worlds Beyond (1965)
- Needle in a Timestack (1966)
- The Calibrated Alligator (1969)
- Dimension Thirteen (1969)
- Parsecs and Parables (1970)
- The Cube Root of Uncertainty (1970)
- Moonferns & Starsongs (1971)
- The Reality Trip and Other Implausibilities (1972)
- Valley Beyond Time (1973)
- Earth's Other Shadow (1973)
- Unfamiliar Territory (1973)
- Born with the Dead (1974)
- Sundance and Other Science Fiction Stories (1974)
- The Feast of St. Dionysus: Five Science Fiction Stories (1975)
- Sunrise on Mercury and Other Science Fiction Stories (1975)
- The Best of Robert Silverberg (1976)
- Capricorn Games (1976)
- The Shores of Tomorrow (1976)
- The Best of Robert Silverberg, Volume Two (1978)
- The Songs of Summer (1979)
- Needle in a Timestack (1979), differs from the 1966 collection of the same name
- Majipoor Chronicles (1982)
- World of a Thousand Colors (1982)
- Sunrise on Mercury (1983), differs from the similarly named 1975 collection
- The Conglomeroid Cocktail Party (1984)
- Beyond the Safe Zone (1986)
- Secret Sharers (1992)
- Sailing to Byzantium (2000)
- In Another Country and Other Short Novels (2002)
- Phases of the Moon (2004)
- In the Beginning: Tales from the Pulp Era (2006)
- A Little Intelligence (2009), with Randall Garrett
- Dangerous Dimensions (2011)
- Hunt the Space-Witch! (2011)
- Around the Continuum (2012)
- Beyond the Beyond (2012)
- The Best of Robert Silverberg: Stories of Six Decades (2012)
- Tales of Majipoor (2013)
- Sailing to Byzantium: Six Novellas (2013)
- The Robert Silverberg Science Fiction Megapack (2016)
- Early Days: More Tales from the Pulp Era (2016)
- First-Person Singularities (2017)
- Rough Trade (2017)
- Time and Time Again (2018)
- Needle in a Timestack and Other Stories (2019), differs from the similarly named 1966 and 1979 collections
- Alien Archives (2019)
- Voyagers: Twelve Journeys Through Space and Time (2021)
- Exotic Adventures of Robert Silverberg (2021)
- Robert Silverberg's Monsters and Things (2023)
- A Multitude of Worlds (2025)

The Collected Stories (Grafton / HarperCollins)

- Pluto in the Morning Light: The Collected Stories of Robert Silverberg, Volume 1 (1992)
- The Secret Sharers: The Collected Stories of Robert Silverberg, Volume 2 (1993), differs from the similarly named 1992 collection
- Beyond the Safe Zone: The Collected Stories of Robert Silverberg, Volume 3 (1994), identical to the similarly named 1986 collection
- The Road to Nightfall: The Collected Stories of Robert Silverberg, Volume 4 (1996)
- Ringing the Changes: The Collected Stories of Robert Silverberg, Volume 5 (1997)
- Lion Time in Timbuctoo: The Collected Stories of Robert Silverberg, Volume 6 (2000)

The Collected Stories (Subterranean Press)

- To Be Continued: The Collected Stories Volume 1 (2006)
- To the Dark Star: The Collected Stories Volume 2 (2007)
- Something Wild Is Loose: The Collected Stories Volume 3 (2008)
- Trips: The Collected Stories Volume 4 (2009)
- The Palace at Midnight: The Collected Stories Volume 5 (2010)
- Multiples: The Collected Stories Volume 6 (2011)
- We Are for the Dark: The Collected Stories Volume 7 (2012)
- Hot Times in Magma City: The Collected Stories Volume 8 (2013)
- The Millennium Express: The Collected Stories Volume 9 (2014)

== Anthologies edited ==
=== The Science Fiction Hall of Fame ===
- The Science Fiction Hall of Fame, Volume One, 1929–1964 (1970) ISBN 978-0-765-30537-4

=== Alpha ===
- Alpha 1 (1970) ISBN 978-0-345-22014-1
- Alpha 2 (1971) ISBN 978-0-345-02419-0
- Alpha 3 (1972) ISBN 978-0-345-02883-9
- Alpha 4 (1973) ISBN 978-0-345-23564-0
- Alpha 5 (1974) ISBN 978-0-345-24140-5
- Alpha 6 (1976) ISBN 978-0-425-03048-6
- Alpha 7 (1977) ISBN 978-0-425-03530-6
- Alpha 8 (1977) ISBN 978-0-425-03561-0
- Alpha 9 (1978) ISBN 978-0-425-03838-3

=== New Dimensions ===
- New Dimensions 1 (1971)
- New Dimensions II (1972) ISBN 978-0-380-21436-5
- New Dimensions 3 (1973)
- New Dimensions IV (1974)
- New Dimensions Science Fiction 5 (1975) ISBN 978-0-060-13870-7
- New Dimensions Science Fiction 6 (1976) ISBN 978-0-575-02173-0
- New Dimensions Science Fiction 7 (1977) ISBN 978-0-060-13864-6
- New Dimensions Science Fiction 8 (1978)
- New Dimensions Science Fiction 9 (1979)
- The Best of New Dimensions (1979)
- New Dimensions Science Fiction 10 (1980)
- New Dimensions 11 (1980) (with Marta Randall)
- New Dimensions 12 (1981) (with Marta Randall)

=== Nebula Award anthologies ===
- The Nebula Awards #18 (1983)
- Nebula Awards Showcase 2001 (2001)

=== Universe anthologies (with Karen Haber) ===
- Universe 1 (1990)
- Universe 2 (1992)
- Universe 3 (1994)

=== Legends ===
- Legends (1998)
- Legends II (2003)

=== Others ===
- Earthmen & Strangers (1966)
  - Terrestres e estranhos (1968), Portuguese version of Earthmen & Strangers including new Portuguese scifi texts organized by Portuguese writer and publisher Lima Rodrigues
- Men and Machines (1968)
- Voyagers in Time (1967)
- How It Was When the Past Went Away (1969) in: Three For Tomorrow (3 short stories by Silverberg, Roger Zelazny, James Blish, foreword Arthur C. Clarke) (1970, Victor Gollancz; 1972, Sphere Books, p. 11-80)
- Great Short Novels of Science Fiction (1970} SBN 345-01960-1-095 Six novellas by A. Bertram Chandler, C.M. Kornbluth, Jack Vance, Charles V. DeVet and Katherine MacLean, Wyman Guin, Roger Zelazny
- Deep Space: Eight Stories of Science Fiction (1973)
- Other Dimensions: Ten Stories of Science Fiction (1973)
- Infinite Jests: The Lighter Side of Science Fiction (1974)
- Mutants (1974)
- Epoch (with Roger Elwood) (1975)
- Strange Gifts (1975)
- Dawn of Time (with Martin H. Greenberg and Joseph Olander) (1979)
- The Edge of Space (1979)
- The Arbor House Treasury of Modern Science Fiction (1980) (with Martin H. Greenberg)
- The Arbor House Treasury of Great Science Fiction Short Novels (1980) (with Martin H. Greenberg)
- The Best of Randall Garrett (1982)
- The Science Fictional Dinosaur (1982) (with Martin H. Greenberg & Charles G. Waugh)
- The Fantasy Hall of Fame (with Martin H. Greenberg) (1983)
- The Arbor House Treasury of Science Fiction Masterpieces (1983) (with Martin H. Greenberg)
- The Time Travelers: A Science Fiction Quartet (1985) (with Martin H. Greenberg)
- Robert Silverberg's Worlds of Wonder (1987), republished as Science Fiction 101: Exploring the Craft of Science Fiction (2001)
- Neanderthals (1987) (with Martin H. Greenberg & Charles G. Waugh)
- Time Gate (1989) (with Bill Fawcett)
- Dangerous Interfaces (1990)
- The Horror Hall of Fame (1991) (with Martin H. Greenberg)
- The Ultimate Dinosaur (1992) (with Byron Preiss)
- A Century of Science Fiction 1950-1959 (1997)
- The Fantasy Hall of Fame (1998)
- Far Horizons (1999)
- Robert Silverberg Presents the Great SF Stories: 1964 (with Martin H. Greenberg) (2001)
- Science Fiction: The Best of 2001 (2002) (with Karen Haber)
- Fantasy: The Best of 2001 (2002) (with Karen Haber)
- Fantasy: The Best of 2002 (2003) (with Karen Haber)
- Science Fiction: The Best of 2002 (2003) (with Karen Haber)
- Great Fantasy (2004)
- Between Worlds (2004)
- Tales from Super-Science Fiction (2011)
- When the Blue Shift Comes (2012) (with Alvaro Zinos-Amaro)
- This Way to the End Times: Classic Tales of the Apocalypse (2016)
- Robots Through the Ages (with Bryan Thomas Schmidt) (2023, Blackstone Publishing, ISBN 979-821238483-4)

== Non-fiction ==
=== For adults ===
- Sex and the Armed Services (1960, as L. T. Woodward, M.D.)
- Sex and Hypnosis (1961, as L. T. Woodward, M.D.)
- 90% of What You Know About Sex Is Wrong (1962, as L.T. Woodward, M.D.)
- Drummond, Walter (pseud.) (1962). Philosopher of evil.
- — (1963). How to spend money.
- Silverberg, Robert (1965). The Great Wall of China. Chilton Books.
- Cook, Roy (pseud.) (1966). Leaders of labor. Philadelphia: Lippincott.
- Kublai Khan: Lord of Xanadu (1966, as Walker Chapman)
- The Loneliest Continent: The Story of Antarctic Discovery (1964, as Walker Chapman)
- Antarctic Conquest: The Great Explorers in Their Own Words (1966, as Walker Chapman)
- The Golden Dream: Seekers of El Dorado (1967, as Walker Chapman)
- Sophisticated Sex Techniques in Marriage (1967, as L. T. Woodward, M.D.)
- Mound Builders of Ancient America: The Archeology of a Myth (New York Graphic Society, 1968); Silverberg's fourth-most widely held work in WorldCat libraries
- The Realm of Prester John (1972)
- Drug Themes in Science Fiction (1974)
- Other Spaces, Other Times: A Life Spent in the Future (2009)
- Reflections and Refractions: Thoughts on Science Fiction, Science and Other Matters (1997; revised & expanded edition 2016)
- Musings and Meditations (2011)
- Living in the Future (2024)

=== For children ===
- Silverberg, Robert (1960). Treasures beneath the sea. Illustrated by Norman Kenyon. Racine: Whitman.
- Black, Edgar (pseud.) (1961). Sir Winston Churchill: the compelling life story of one of the towering figures of the 20th Century. Derby, Conn.: Monarch Books.
- Silverberg, Robert (1961). First American into space. Derby, Conn.: Monarch Books.
- — (1962). Lost cities and vanished civilizations. Philadelphia: Chilton.
- — (1963). The fabulous Rockefellers.
- — (1963). Sunken history: the story of underwater archaeology.
- — (1963). Fifteen battles that changed the world.
- — (1963). Empires in the dust: ancient civilizations brought to light.
- — (1963). Home of the Red Man: Indian North America before Columbus.
- Woodward, L. T. (pseud.) (1963). The history of surgery.
- Silverberg, Robert (1964). The great doctors.
- Man Before Adam: The Story of Man in Search of His Origins (1964)
- Akhnaten: The Rebel Pharaoh (1964)
- 1066 (1964, as Franklin Hamilton)
- The Man Who Found Nineveh: The Story of Austen Henry Layard (1964)
- Great Adventures in Archaeology (1964)
- Socrates (1965)
- Scientists And Scoundrels: A Book of Hoaxes (1965)
- Men Who Mastered the Atom (1965)
- Niels Bohr: The Man Who Mapped the Atom (1965)
- The Old Ones: Indians of the American Southwest (1965)
- The World of Coral (1965)
- The Crusades (1965, as Franklin Hamilton)
- The Long Rampart: The Story of the Great Wall of China (1966)
- Rivers: A Book to Begin On (1966, as Lee Sebastian)
- Forgotten by Time: A Book of Living Fossils (1966)
- Frontiers in Archeology (1966)
- Bridges (1966)
- To the Rock of Darius: The Story of Henry Rawlinson (1966)
- The Hopefuls: Ten Presidential Campaigns (1966, as Lloyd Robinson)
- The Morning of Mankind: Prehistoric Man in Europe (1967)
- The Auk, the Dodo and the Oryx (1967)
- The World of the Rain Forests (1967)
- The Dawn of Medicine (1967)
- The Adventures of Nat Palmer (1967)
- Challenge for a Throne: The Wars of the Roses (1967, as Franklin Hamilton)
- Men Against Time: Salvage Archeology in the United States (1967)
- Light for the World: Edison and the Power Industry (1967)
- The Search for Eldorado (1967, as Walker Chapman)
- The World of the Ocean Depths (1968)
- The Stolen Election: Hayes vs. Tilden, 1876 (1968, as Lloyd Robinson)
- Four Men Who Changed the Universe (1968)
- Sam Houston (1968, as Paul Hollander)
- The South Pole: A Book to Begin On (1968, as Lee Sebastian)
- Stormy Voyager (1968)
- Ghost Towns of the American West (1968)
- Vanishing Giants: The Story of the Sequoias (1969)
- Wonders of Ancient Chinese Science (1969)
- The Challenge of Climate: Man and His Environment (1969)
- Bruce of the Blue Nile (1969)
- The World of Space (1969)
- If I Forget Thee, O Jerusalem (1970)
- The Seven Wonders of the Ancient World (1970)
- Mammoths, Mastodons and Man (1970)
- The Mound Builders (1970, abridged version of Mound Builders of Ancient America (1968) for children); Reprint (Ohio University Press, 1986)
- The Pueblo Revolt (1970)
- Clocks for the Ages: How Scientists Date the Past (1971)
- To The Western Shore: Growth of the United States 1776-1853 (1971)
- Before The Sphinx: Early Egypt (1971)
- Into Space: A Young Person's Guide to Space (1971, with Arthur C. Clarke)
- The Longest Voyage: Circumnavigation in the Age Of Discovery (1972)
- John Muir, Prophet Among the Glaciers (1972)
- The World Within the Ocean Wave (1972)
- The World Within the Tide Pool (1972)

=== Reflections columns in Asimov's Science Fiction ===
- Silverberg, Robert (August 2012). "Big-Endians/Little-Endians". Asimov's Science Fiction. 36 (8): 6–8.
- — (September 2012). "Anthologies". Asimov's Science Fiction. 36 (9): 7–10.
- — (October–November 2012). "Decline and fall". Asimov's Science Fiction. 36 (10&11): 6–8.
- — (December 2012). "Libraries". Asimov's Science Fiction. 36 (12): 6–8.
- — (January 2013). "The Raft of the Medusa". Asimov's Science Fiction. 37 (1): 6–8.
- — (February 2013). "Looking for Atlantis". Asimov's Science Fiction. 37 (2): 6–8.
- — (March 2013). "The year's best science fiction". Asimov's Science Fiction. 37 (3): 6–9.
- — (April–May 2013). "My desk". Asimov's Science Fiction. 37 (4&5): 6–8.
- — (June 2013). "... Not even wrong". Asimov's Science Fiction. 37 (6): 6–8.
- — (July 2013). "John Frum, he come". Asimov's Science Fiction. 37 (7): 6–9.
- — (August 2013). "Rereading Simak". Asimov's Science Fiction. 37 (8): 5–8.
- — (September 2013). "Translations". Asimov's Science Fiction. 37 (9): 6, 8–9.
- — (October–November 2013). "Translations II". Asimov's Science Fiction. 37 (10–11): 8–11.
- — (December 2013). "The plurality of worlds". Asimov's Science Fiction. 37 (12): 6–8.
- — (January 2014). "The plularility of worlds: a contrarian view". Asimov's Science Fiction. 38 (1): 8–11.
- — (February 2014). "Rereading Philip José Farmer". Asimov's Science Fiction. 38 (2): 6–9.
- — (March 2014). "Blues and Greens". Asimov's Science Fiction. 38 (3): 6–9.
- — (April–May 2014). "Borges, Leinster, Google". Asimov's Science Fiction. 38 (4&5): 6–8.
- — (June 2014). "Another transition". Asimov's Science Fiction. 38 (6): 7–9.
- — (July 2014). "Was Jules Verne a science fiction writer?". Asimov's Science Fiction. 38 (7): 6–9.
- — (August 2014). "Longevity". Asimov's Science Fiction. 38 (8): 6–9.
- — (September 2014). "Flashing before my eyes". Asimov's Science Fiction. 38 (9): 6–9.
- — (October–November 2014). "Robert A. Heinlein, author of The Martian Chronicles". Asimov's Science Fiction. 38 (10–11): 7–10.
- — (December 2014). "Rereading S. Fowler Wright". Asimov's Science Fiction. 38 (12): 6–9.
- — (January 2015). "The Richard Hakluyt of space". Asimov's Science Fiction. 39 (1): 6–8.
- — (February 2015). "One-hit wonders". Asimov's Science Fiction. 39 (2): 6–8.
- — (March 2015). "Lost in translation II". Asimov's Science Fiction. 39 (3): 6–9.
- — (April–May 2015). "Praising or banning". Asimov's Science Fiction. 39 (4–5): 6–8.
- — (June 2015). "The world to end last month". Asimov's Science Fiction. 39 (6): 6, 8–9.
- — (July 2015). "Leechdoms, wortcunning, starcraft". Asimov's Science Fiction. 39 (7): 6–9.
- — (August 2015). "Reunite Gondwanaland!". Asimov's Science Fiction. 39 (8): 6–8.
