= Alpha (anthology series) =

Alpha is a series of reprint science fiction anthologies edited by Robert Silverberg, published as paperback originals from 1970 to 1978 by Ballantine Books and Berkley Publishing. Ballantine published volumes annually from 1970 through 1974, while Berkley resumed the series with four volumes from 1976 through 1978. All five of the Ballantine volumes placed in the top ten in an anthology category in the annual Locus Poll, as did the final Berkley volume. Theodore Sturgeon and Gerald Jonas reviewed books in the series for The New York Times Book Review.

- Alpha 1 - Ballantine, September 1970; Corgi, December 1971 (UK)
- Alpha 2 - Ballantine, November 1971
- Alpha 3 - Ballantine, October 1972
- Alpha 4 - Ballantine, October 1973
- Alpha 5 - Ballantine, August 1974
- Alpha 6 - Berkley, April 1976
- Alpha 7 - Berkley, July 1977
- Alpha 8 - Berkley, November 1977
- Alpha 9 - Berkley, October 1978
