= List of awards and nominations received by Robert Silverberg =

Robert Silverberg (born January 15, 1935) is a prolific American science fiction author and editor. He is a multiple winner of both Hugo and Nebula Awards, a member of the Science Fiction and Fantasy Hall of Fame, and a Grand Master of SF since 2004.

Year & Award	Category	Result	Ref.
1956 Hugo Award	Most Promising New Author	Won	
1984 Edward E. Smith Memorial Award		Won	
1985 Forry Awards	Lifetime Achievement	Won	
1987 Inkpot Award		Won	
1989 Interzone Readers Poll	All-Time Best SF Author	9th Place	
1999 Science Fiction Hall of Fame	Living Inductee	Inducted	
2001 Hugo Award	Retro Hugos 1951: Best Fan Writer	Won	
2004 Damon Knight Memorial Grand Master Award		Won	
2018 First Fandom Hall of Fame award		Won	

Work	Year and Award	Category	Result	Ref.
"Hawksbill Station"	1968 Hugo Award	Novella	Finalist	
"Hawksbill Station"	1968 Nebula Award	Novella	Nominated	
Thorns	1968 Nebula Award	Novel	Nominated	
Thorns	1968 Hugo Award	Novel	Nominated	
The Masks of Time	1969 Nebula Award	Novel	Nominated	
"Nightwings" (Novella)	1969 Hugo Award	Novella	Won	
"Nightwings" (Novella)	1969 Nebula Award	Novella	Nominated	
"To Jorslem"	1970 Nebula Award	Novella	Nominated	
"To Jorslem"	1970 Hugo Award	Novella	Nominated	
Up the Line	1970 Nebula Award	Novel	Nominated	
Up the Line	1970 Hugo Award	Novel	Nominated	
Up the Line	1975 Seiun Award	Translated Long Work	Won	
"Passengers"	1970 Nebula Award	Short Story	Won	
"Passengers"	1970 Hugo Award	Short Story	Nominated	
"The World Outside"	1971 Hugo Award	Novella	Nominated	
Science Fiction Hall of Fame Volume One	1971 Locus Award	Anthology/Collection	Won	
Great Short Novels of Science Fiction	1971 Locus Award	Anthology/Collection	Nominated	
Alpha One	1971 Locus Award	Anthology/Collection	Nominated	
"The Throwbacks"	1971 Locus Award	Short Fiction	Nominated	
Tower of Glass	1971 Nebula Award	Novel	Nominated	
Tower of Glass	1971 Hugo Award	Novel	Nominated	
Tower of Glass	1971 Locus Award	Novel	Nominated	
Tower of Glass	1971 Ditmar Award	International Fiction	Nominated	
Tower of Glass	2013 Geffen Award	Translated Science Fiction Novel	Won	
Downward to the Earth	1971 Locus Award	Novel	Nominated	
Nightwings (Novel)	1972 Seiun Award	Translated Long Work	Won	
Nightwings (Novel)	1976 Prix Apollo Award		Won	
A Time of Changes	1972 Nebula Award	Novel	Nominated	
A Time of Changes	1972 Hugo Award	Novel	Nominated	
A Time of Changes	1972 Ditmar Award	International Fiction	Nominated	
A Time of Changes	1972 Locus Award	Novel	Nominated	
A Time of Changes	2005 Prometheus Award	Hall of Fame	Nominated	
Son of Man	1972 Locus Award	Novel	Nominated	
"Good News from the Vatican"	1972 Nebula Award	Short Story	Won	
The Second Trip	1972 Locus Award	Novel	Nominated	
New Dimensions 1	1972 Locus Award	Anthology	Nominated	
"In Entropy's Jaws"	1972 Locus Award	Short Fiction	Nominated	
"All the Way Up, All the Way Down"	1972 Locus Award	Short Fiction	Nominated	
The World Inside	1972 Locus Award	Novel	Nominated	
New Dimensions II	1973 Locus Award	Anthology	Nominated	
The Day the Sun Stood Still	1973 Locus Award	Anthology	Nominated	
The Book of Skulls	1973 Hugo Award	Novel	Nominated	
The Book of Skulls	1973 Nebula Award	Novel	Nominated	
The Book of Skulls	1973 Locus Award	Short Fiction	Nominated	
"When We Went to See the End of the World"	1973 Nebula Award	Short Story	Nominated	
"When We Went to See the End of the World"	1973 Hugo Award	Short Story	Nominated	
"When We Went to See the End of the World"	1973 Locus Award	Short Story	Nominated	
"(Now+n), (Now-n)"	1973 Locus Award	Short Fiction	Nominated	
Dying Inside	1973 Nebula Award	Novel	Nominated	
Dying Inside	1973 Hugo Award	Novel	Finalist	
Dying Inside	1973 Ditmar Award	International Fiction	Nominated	
Dying Inside	1973 Locus Award	Novel	Nominated	
Dying Inside	1975 Locus Award	Best All-time Novel	19th Place	
"Caliban"	1973 Locus Award	Short Fiction	Nominated	
"Ms. Found in an Abandoned Time Machine"	1974 Locus Award	Short Fiction	Nominated	
"The Feast of St. Dionysus"	1974 Locus Award	Novella	Nominated	
"The Feast of St. Dionysus"	1974 Jupiter Award	Novella	Won	
"Many Mansions"	1974 Locus Award	Short Fiction	Nominated	
New Dimensions 3	1974 Hugo Award	Professional Editor	Nominated	
New Dimensions 3	1974 Locus Award	Anthology	Nominated	
Chains of the Sea	1974 Locus Award	Anthology	Nominated	
"In the Group"	1974 Locus Award	Short Fiction	Nominated	
"In the Group"	2007 Premio Ignotus	Foreign Story	Nominated	
Threads of Time	1975 Locus Award	Anthology	Nominated	
New Dimensions IV	1975 Hugo Award	Professional Editor	Nominated	
New Dimensions IV	1975 Locus Award	Anthology	Nominated	
"Born with the Dead"	1975 Nebula Award	Novella	Won	
"Born with the Dead"	1975 Jupiter Award	Novella	Nominated	
"Born with the Dead"	1975 Hugo Award	Novella	Finalist	
"Born with the Dead"	1975 Locus Award	Novella	Won	
Born with the Dead (Collection)	1975 Locus Award	Collection	Nominated	
"Schwartz Between the Galaxies"	1975 Hugo Award	Short Story	Nominated	
"Schwartz Between the Galaxies"	1975 Locus Award	Short Story	Nominated	
"In the House of Double Minds"	1975 Locus Award	Short Story	Nominated	
New Dimensions 5	1976 Hugo Award	Professional Editor	Nominated	
New Dimensions 5	1976 Locus Award	Anthology	Nominated	
The New Atlantis	1976 Locus Award	Anthology	Nominated	
Epoch (with Roger Elwood)	1976 Locus Award	Anthology	Nominated	
The Feast of St. Dionysus (Collection)	1976 Locus Award	Collection	Nominated	
The Stochastic Man	1976 Hugo Award	Novel	Nominated	
The Stochastic Man	1976 Nebula Award	Novel	Nominated	
The Stochastic Man	1976 John W. Campbell Memorial Award	Science Fiction Novel	Nominated	
The Stochastic Man	1976 Locus Award	Novel	Nominated	
Shadrach in the Furnace	1977 Nebula Award	Novel	Nominated	
Shadrach in the Furnace	1977 Hugo Award	Novel	Finalist	
Shadrach in the Furnace	1977 Locus Award	Novel	Nominated	
The Crystal Ship	1977 Locus Award	Anthology	Nominated	
Capricorn Games	1977 Locus Award	Collection	Nominated	
New Dimensions 6	1977 Locus Award	Anthology	Nominated	
The Best of Robert Silverberg	1977 Locus Award	Collection	Nominated	
New Dimensions 8	1979 Locus Award	Anthology	Nominated	
Alpha 9	1979 Locus Award	Anthology	Nominated	
The Edge of Space	1980 Locus Award	Anthology	Nominated	
The Best of New Dimensions	1980 Locus Award	Anthology	Nominated	
New Dimensions 11	1981 Locus Award	Anthology	Nominated	
The Arbor House Treasury of Modern Science Fiction (with Martin H. Greenberg)	1981 Locus Award	Anthology	Nominated	
The Arbor House Treasury of Great Science Fiction Short Novels (with Martin H. Greenberg)	1981 Locus Award	Anthology	Nominated	
Lord Valentine's Castle	1981 Hugo Award	Novel	Nominated	
Lord Valentine's Castle	1981 Balrog Award	Novel	Nominated	
Lord Valentine's Castle	1981 Locus Award	Fantasy Novel	Won	
Lord Valentine's Castle	1987 Locus Award	All-Time Best Fantasy Novel	25th Place	
"Our Lady of the Sauropods"	1981 Hugo Award	Short Story	Nominated	
"Our Lady of the Sauropods"	1981 Locus Award	Short Story	Nominated	
New Dimensions 12 (with Marta Randall)	1982 Locus Award	Anthology	Nominated	
"The Regulars"	1982 Locus Award	Short Story	Nominated	
"The Palace at Midnight"	1982 Locus Award	Short Story	Nominated	
"Waiting for the Earthquake"	1982 Locus Award	Novelette	Nominated	
"A Thousand Paces Along the Via Dolorosa"	1982 Locus Award	Novelette	Nominated	
"A Thief in Ni-moya"	1982 Locus Award	Novelette	Nominated	
"The Desert of Stolen Dreams"	1982 Locus Award	Novella	Nominated	
"The Pope of the Chimps"	1983 Nebula Award	Short Story	Nominated	
"The Pope of the Chimps"	1983 Locus Award	Novelette	Nominated	
Majipoor Chronicles	1983 Locus Award	Collection	Nominated	
"Thesme and the Ghayrog"	1983 Locus Award	Novella	Nominated	
"Gianni"	1983 Locus Award	Short Story	Nominated	
The Nebula Awards 18	1984 Locus Award	Anthology	Nominated	
The Fantasy Hall of Fame (with Martin H. Greenberg)	1984 Locus Award	Anthology	Nominated	
The Arbor House Treasury of Science Fiction Masterpieces (with Martin H. Greenberg)	1984 Locus Award	Anthology	Nominated	
"Homefaring"	1984 Nebula Award	Novella	Nominated	
"Homefaring"	1984 SF Chronicle Award	Novella	Nominated	
"Homefaring"	1984 Locus Award	Novella	Nominated	
"Needle in a Timestack"	1984 Locus Award	Short Story	Nominated	
"Basileus"	1984 Locus Award	Short Story	Nominated	
"Amanda and the Alien"	1984 Locus Award	Short Story	Nominated	
"Multiples"	1984 Locus Award	Novelette	Nominated	
Valentine Pontifex	1984 Locus Award	SF Novel	Nominated	
The Conglomeroid Cocktail Party	1985 Locus Award	Collection	Nominated	
"Tourist Trade"	1985 Locus Award	Short Story	Nominated	
"The Affair"	1985 Locus Award	Short Story	Nominated	
Gilgamesh the King	1985 Locus Award	Fantasy Novel	Nominated	
Gilgamesh the King	2009 Tähtifantasia Award		Shortlisted	
"Sunrise on Pluto"	1986 Locus Award	Short Story	Nominated	
"Sailing to Byzantium"	1986 Hugo Award	Novella	Nominated	
"Sailing to Byzantium"	1986 Nebula Award	Novella	Won	
"Sailing to Byzantium"	1986 SF Chronicle Award	Novella	Nominated	
"Sailing to Byzantium"	1986 Locus Award	Novella	Nominated	
Tom O'Bedlam	1986 Locus Award	SF Novel	Nominated	
Beyond the Safe Zone	1987 Locus Award	Collection	Nominated	
"Blindsight"	1987 Locus Award	Short Story	Nominated	
"Against Babylon"	1987 Locus Award	Novelette	Nominated	
"Gilgamesh in the Outback"	1987 Hugo Award	Novella	Won	
"Gilgamesh in the Outback"	1987 Nebula Award	Novella	Nominated	
"Gilgamesh in the Outback"	1987 SF Chronicle Award	Novella	Nominated	
"Gilgamesh in the Outback"	1987 Asimov's Readers' Poll	Novella	5th Place	
"Gilgamesh in the Outback"	1987 Locus Award	Novella	Nominated	
Star of Gypsies	1987 Locus Award	Novel	Nominated	
"The Secret Sharer"	1988 Nebula Award	Novella	Nominated	
"The Secret Sharer"	1988 Hugo Award	Novella	Nominated	
"The Secret Sharer"	1988 SF Chronicle Award	Novella	Won	
"The Secret Sharer"	1988 Asimov's Readers' Poll	Novella	3rd Place	
"The Secret Sharer"	1988 Locus Award	Novella	Won	
Robert Silverberg's Worlds of Wonder	1988 Locus Award	Anthology	Nominated	
"The Iron Star"	1988 Locus Award	Short Story	Nominated	
"Gilgamesh in Uruk"	1989 Asimov's Readers' Poll	Novella	9th Place	
"At Winter's End"	1989 Asimov's Readers' Poll	Novella	5th Place	
"At Winter's End"	1989 Locus Award	SF Novel	Nominated	
"We Are for the Dark"	1989 Asimov's Readers' Poll	Novella	10th Place	
"We Are for the Dark"	1989 Locus Award	Novella	Nominated	
"House of Bones"	1989 Locus Award	Short Story	Nominated	
"The Dead Man's Eyes"	1989 Locus Award	Short Story	Nominated	
"Hannibal's Elephants"	1989 Locus Award	Novelette	Nominated	
"Tales from the Venia Woods"	1990 Locus Award	Short Story	Nominated	
"To the Promised Land"	1990 Locus Award	Novelette	Nominated	
"A Sleep and a Forgetting"	1990 Locus Award	Novelette	Nominated	
"Enter a Soldier. Later: Enter Another"	1990 Nebula Award	Novelette	Nominated	
"Enter a Soldier. Later: Enter Another"	1990 Hugo Award	Novelette	Won	
"Enter a Soldier. Later: Enter Another"	1990 Asimov's Readers' Poll	Novelette	3rd Place	
"Enter a Soldier. Later: Enter Another"	1990 Locus Award	Novelette	Nominated	
"Enter a Soldier. Later: Enter Another"	2001 Premio Ignotus	Foreign Short Story	Won	
"In Another Country"	1990 Asimov's Readers' Poll	Novella	9th Place	
"In Another Country"	1990 Locus Award	Novella	Nominated	
The Queen of Springtime (aka: The New Springtime)	1990 Locus Award	SF Novel	Nominated	
Universe 1 (with Karen Haber)	1991 Locus Award	Anthology	Nominated	
"Hot Sky"	1991 Locus Award	Novelette	Nominated	
"Lion Time in Timbuctoo"	1991 Asimov's Readers' Poll	Novella	9th Place	
"Lion Time in Timbuctoo"	1991 Locus Award	Novella	Nominated	
"Lion Time in Timbuctoo"	1995 Grand prix de l'Imaginaire	Foreign Short story/Collection of Foreign Short Stories	Nominated	
"An Outpost of the Empire"	1992 Locus Award	Short Story	Nominated	
"A Tip on a Turtle"	1992 Locus Award	Novelette	Nominated	
The Face of the Waters	1992 Grand prix de l'Imaginaire	Foreign Novel	Nominated	
The Face of the Waters	1996 Kurd Laßwitz Award	Foreign Work	Nominated	
Universe 2 (with Karen Haber)	1993 Locus Award	Anthology	Nominated	
"Thebes of the Hundred Gates"	1993 HOMer Awards	Novella	Nominated	
"Thebes of the Hundred Gates"	1993 Locus Award	Novella	Nominated	
The Collected Stories of Robert Silverberg, Volume 1: Secret Sharers	1993 Locus Award	Collection	Won	
"Looking for the Fountain"	1993 Locus Award	Novelette	Nominated	
"The Sri Lanka Position"	1994 Locus Award	Short Story	Nominated	
Universe 3 (with Karen Haber)	1995 Locus Award	Anthology	Nominated	
"Via Roma"	1995 Asimov's Readers' Poll	Novella	9th Place	
"Via Roma"	1995 Locus Award	Novella	Nominated	
"The Red Blaze is the Morning"	1996 Locus Award	Novelette	Nominated	
"Hot Times in Magma City"	1996 Locus Award	Novella	Nominated	
"Diana of the Hundred Breasts"	1997 Locus Award	Novelette	Nominated	
"The Tree That Grew from the Sky"	1997 Locus Award	Novella	Nominated	
"Death Do Us Part"	1997 Locus Award	Short Story	Nominated	
"Death Do Us Part"	1998 Asimov's Readers' Poll	Novelette	10th Place	
Reflections and Refractions: Thoughts on Science-Fiction, Science and Other Matters	1998 Hugo Award	Related Work	Nominated	
Reflections and Refractions: Thoughts on Science-Fiction, Science and Other Matters	1998 Locus Award	Non-Fiction	Nominated	
A Century of Science Fiction, 1950 - 1959	1998 Locus Award	Anthology	Nominated	
"On the Inside"	1998 Science Fiction Age Readers Poll	Short Story	Won	
"On the Inside"	1998 Locus Award	Short Story	Nominated	
"Waiting for the End"	1998 Sidewise Awards	Short Form	Nominated	
"Waiting for the End"	1999 Asimov's Readers' Poll	Novelette	7th Place	
"Waiting for the End"	1999 Locus Award	Novelette	Nominated	
Hot Sky at Midnight	1998 Kurd Laßwitz Award	Foreign Work	Nominated	
Child of Time (with Isaac Asimov)	1998 Kurd Laßwitz Award	Foreign Work	Nominated	
"Beauty in the Night"	1998 Locus Award	Novelette	Nominated	
Legends: Short Novels by the Masters of Modern Fantasy	1999 Alex Awards		Won	
Legends: Short Novels by the Masters of Modern Fantasy	1999 World Fantasy Award	Anthology	Nominated	
Legends: Short Novels by the Masters of Modern Fantasy	1999 Locus Award	Anthology	Won	
The Avram Davidson Treasury (as editor) (with Grania Davis)	1999 World Fantasy Special Award—Professional		Nominated	
The Avram Davidson Treasury (as editor) (with Grania Davis)	1999 Locus Award	Collection	Won	
"Getting to Know the Dragon"	1999 Sidewise Awards	Short Form	Nominated	
"Getting to Know the Dragon"	2000 Locus Award	Novelette	Nominated	
"A Hero of the Empire"	1999 Sidewise Awards	Short Form	Nominated	
"A Hero of the Empire"	2000 Locus Award	Novelette	Nominated	
"The Colonol in Autumn"	1999 Locus Award	Novella	Nominated	
The Alien Years	1999 Locus Award	SF Novel	Nominated	
The Alien Years	2001 Kurd Laßwitz Award	Foreign Work	Nominated	
Far Horizons: All New Tales from the Greatest Worlds of Science Fiction	2000 Locus Award	Anthology	Won	
Far Horizons: All New Tales from the Greatest Worlds of Science Fiction	2001 Premio Ignotus	Collected Work	Nominated	
The Positronic Man (with Isaac Asimov)	2001 Seiun Award	Translated Long Work	Won	
Sailing to Byzantium (Collection)	2001 Locus Award	Collection	Nominated	
"The Millenium Express"	2001 Locus Award	Short Story	Nominated	
Nebula Awards Showcase 2001	2002 Locus Award	Anthology	Nominated	
"With Caesar in the Underworld"	2002 Sidewise Awards	Short Form	Nominated	
"With Caesar in the Underworld"	2003 Asimov's Readers' Poll	Novella	3rd Place	
Robert Silverberg Presents the Great SF Stories: 1964 (with Martin H. Greenberg)	2003 Locus Award	Anthology	Nominated	
"Reign of Terror"	2003 Sidewise Awards	Short Form	Nominated	
"Reign of Terror"	2004 Asimov's Readers' Poll	Novelette	7th Place	
"The Second Wave"	2003 Asimov's Readers' Poll	Novelette	10th Place	
Science Fiction: The Best of 2002 (with Karen Haber)	2004 Locus Award	Anthology	Nominated	
Legends II: New Short Novels by the Masters of Modern Fantasy	2004 Locus Award	Anthology	Nominated	
Roma Eterna	2004 Locus Award	Collection	Nominated	
Between Worlds	2005 Locus Award	Anthology	Nominated	
Phases of the Moon: Stories from Six Decades	2005 Locus Award	Collection	Nominated	
"Against the Current"	2008 Locus Award	Novelette	Nominated	
"The Emperor and the Maula"	2008 Locus Award	Novella	Nominated	
Trips: The Collected Stories, Volume 4	2010 Locus Award	Collection	Nominated	
"The True Vintage of Erzuine Thale"	2010 Locus Award	Novelette	Nominated	
"A Piece of the Great World"	2011 Grand prix de l'Imaginaire	Foreign Short story/Collection of Foreign Short Stories	Nominated	
Musings and Meditations	2012 Locus Award	Non-Fiction	Nominated	
The Collected Stories of Robert Silverberg, Volume Seven: We Are for the Dark	2013 Locus Award	Collection	Nominated	
The Collected Stories of Robert Silverberg, Volume Eight: Hot Times in Magma City	2014 Locus Award	Collection	Nominated	
Tales of Majipoor	2014 RUSA CODES Reading List	Science Fiction	Shortlisted	
The Collected Stories of Robert Silverberg, Volume Nine: The Millennium Express	2015 Locus Award	Collection	Nominated	
Roma Eterna	2015 Italia Awards	International Novel	Won	
Traveler of Worlds: Conversations with Robert Silverberg (with Alvaro Zinos-Amaro)	2017 Hugo Award	Related Work	Nominated	
Time and Time Again	2018 Foreword INDIE	Science Fiction - Adult Fiction	Won/Gold	
