= Glass Tower =

Glass Tower may refer to:

- Glass Tower (video game), iOS tower collapse game
- The Glass Tower, 1957 West German drama film
- Tower of Glass, a 1970 novel by Robert Silverberg
- Glass Towers, Australian indie rock active since 2008
- A tower made with a glass curtain wall
- Glass Tower, the fictional 138-storey skyscraper in the 1974 disaster film The Towering Inferno
