= Alpha 2 =

Alpha 2 may refer to:

- Street Fighter Alpha 2, a 1996 fighting game
- Alpha 2 (anthology), a science fiction anthology edited by Robert Silverberg
- Alpha-2 adrenergic receptor, a protein family
- ISO 3166-1 alpha-2, two-letter country codes as assigned by the International Organization for Standardization
