= La Compagnie des Glaces (role-playing game) =

1986 French TTRPG

La compagnie des glaces is a 1986 French tabletop role-playing game published by Jeux Actuels. Its setting is based on the La Compagnie des glaces novel series by Georges-Jean Arnaud.

== Gameplay ==
La compagnie des glaces is a game in which the setting unfolds in a frozen post-apocalyptic world where humanity survives aboard colossal trains traversing the icy wastelands of trans-European tundra, ruled by powerful rail-based corporations.

== Reviews ==
- Casus Belli #32
- Casus Belli #33
- Jeux & Stratégie #39
