= Alpha 6 =

Alpha 6 may refer to:

- Alpha 6 (device), a device claimed to detect explosives and drugs
- Alpha 6 (Robert Silverberg anthology), a science fiction anthology edited by Robert Silverberg, first published in 1976
- Alpha 6 (Power Rangers), a Power Rangers character
- COL4A6, a human gene
- Integrin alpha 6, a human protein
- Ceti Alpha VI, a fictional planet mentioned in Star Trek II: The Wrath of Khan
