= Alpha 3 =

Alpha 3 may refer to:

- Street Fighter Alpha 3, a 1998 fighting game
- Alpha 3 (anthology), a science fiction anthology edited by Robert Silverberg
