= La Compagnie des glaces =

Science fiction novel series by Georges-Jean Arnaud

La Compagnie des glaces ("The Ice Company") is a series of 97 post-apocalyptic science fiction novels by the French writer Georges-Jean Arnaud, published between 1980 and 2005.

Its setting is the Earth of the far future, covered by ice and governed dictatorially by railroad companies. In addition to science fiction, the novels also exhibit elements of crime and spy fiction.

The series was adapted, in part, for television (Grand Star), and as a comics series. It also inspired a video game (Transarctica) and an anime series (Yoshiyuki Tomino's Overman King Gainer).

== Novels ==
All novels were published by Fleuve noir. The first volume received the 1988 Prix Apollo. It is the only one to have been translated into English. When the book was published as The Ice Company in 2010 (ISBN 978-1-935558-31-6), the foreword mentioned that the translators Jean-Marc & Randy Lofficier translated the novel into English in 1987 for Fleuve noir to find an American publisher. This translation also included a short list of plot summaries of all volumes that were released up to that point.

=== La Compagnie des glaces ===
The main series concluded in 1992 with the sixty-second volume.

1. La Compagnie des glaces (1980)
2. Le Sanctuaire des glaces (1980)
3. Le Peuple des glaces (1981)
4. Les Chasseurs des glaces (1981)
5. L'Enfant des glaces (1981)
6. Les Otages des glaces (1981)
7. Le Gnome halluciné (1982)
8. La Compagnie de la banquise (1982)
9. Le Réseau de Patagonie (1982)
10. Les Voiliers du rail (1982)
11. Les Fous du soleil (1983)
12. Network-Cancer (1983)
13. Station-fantôme (1983)
14. Les Hommes-Jonas (1983)
15. Terminus-amertume (1983)
16. Les Brûleurs de banquise (1983)
17. Le Gouffre aux garous (1984)
18. Le Dirigeable sacrilège (1984)
19. Liensun (1984)
20. Les Éboueurs de la vie éternelle (1984)
21. Les Trains-cimetières (1985)
22. Les Fils de Lien Rag (1985)
23. Voyageuse Yeuse (1985)
24. L'Ampoule de cendres (1985)
25. Sun Company (1986)
26. Les Sibériens (1986)
27. Le Clochard ferroviaire (1986)
28. Les Wagons -mémoires (1986)
29. Mausolée pour une locomotive (1986)
30. Dans le ventre d'une légende (1986)
31. Les Échafaudages d'épouvante (1986)
32. Les Montagnes affamées (1987)
33. La Prodigieuse agonie (1987)
34. On m'appelait Lien Rag (1987)
35. Train spécial pénitentiaire 34 (1987)
36. Les Hallucinés de la voie oblique (1987)
37. L'Abominable postulat (1988)
38. Le Sang des Ragus (1988)
39. La caste des Aiguilleurs (1988)
40. Les Exilés du ciel croûteux (1988)
41. Exode barbare (1988)
42. La Chair des étoiles (1988)
43. L'Aube cruelle d'un temps nouveau (1988)
44. Les Canyons du Pacifique (1989)
45. Les Vagabonds des brumes (1989)
46. La Banquise déchiquetée (1989)
47. Soleil blême (1989)
48. L'Huile des morts (1989)
49. Les Oubliés de Chimère (1989)
50. Les Cargos-dirigeables du soleil (1990)
51. La Guilde des sanguinaires (1990)
52. La Croix pirate (1990)
53. Le Pays de Djoug (1990)
54. La Banquise de bois (1990)
55. Iceberg-ship (1991)
56. Lacustra city (1991)
57. L'Héritage du Bulb (1991)
58. Les Millénaires perdus (1991)
59. La Guerre du peuple du froid (1991)
60. Les Tombeaux de l'Antarctique (1991)
61. La Charogne céleste (1992)
62. Il était une fois la compagnie des glaces (1992)

=== Chroniques glaciaires ===
The Chroniques glaciaires ("Glacier Chronicles") cover the period of Earth's glacification.

63. Les Rails d'incertitude (1995)
64. Les Illuminés (1997)
65. Le Sang du monde (1998)
66. Les Prédestinés (1999)
67. Les Survivants crépusculaires (1999)
68. Sidéral-Léviathan (1999)
69. L'Œil parasite (1999)
70. Planète nomade (2000)
71. Roark (2000)
72. Les Baleines Solinas (2000)
73. La Légende des Hommes-Jonas (2000)

=== La nouvelle Compagnie des Glaces ===
The La nouvelle Compagnie des Glaces (The New Ice Company) novels began publication in 2001 and continue the original plot fifteen years later.

74. La Ceinture de Feu (2001)
75. Le Chenal Noir (2001)
76. Le Réseau de l'Éternelle nuit (2001)
77. Les Hommes du Cauchemar (2001)
78. Les Spectres de l'Altiplano (2001)
79. Les Momies du massacre (2002)
80. L'Ombre du Serpent Gris (2002)
81. Les Griffes de la banquise (2002)
82. Les Forbans du Nord (2002)
83. Les Icebergs lunaires (2002)
84. Le Sanctuaire de légende (2002)
85. Les Mystères d'Altaï (2003)
86. La Locomotive-dieu (2003)
87. Pari cataclysme (2003)
88. Movane la chamane (2003)
89. Channel Drake (2003)
90. Le Sang des Aliens (2004)
91. Caste barbare (2004)
92. Parano River (2004)
93. Indomptable Fleur (2004)
94. Le Masque de l'autre (2004)
95. Passions rapaces (2005)
96. L'Irrévocable testament (2005)
97. Ultime Mirage (2005)

== Adaptations ==
=== Games ===
Jeux Actuels published the La Compagnie des Glaces pen-and-paper roleplaying game based on the series in 1986.

The video game Transarctica (1992) by Silmarils was inspired by the setting and plot of the novels.

=== Comics ===
Dargaud published a bande dessinée adaptation of the series, written by Philippe Bonifay. Originally projected to run for 100 volumes, the series ended after 15 volumes (covering roughly the first ten novels) because of its limited commercial success.

List of volumes

- Jdrien cycle
1. Lien Rag (2003)
2. Floa Sadon (2003)
3. Kurts (2004)
4. Frère Pierre (2004)
5. Jdrou (2005)
6. Yeuse (2005)
7. Pietr (2005)
- Cabaret Miki cycle
8. Le Peuple du sel (2006)
9. Otage des glaces (2006)
10. Zone Occidentale (2007)
11. Big Tube (2007)
12. La Fin d'un Rêve (2008)
- La Compagnie de la banquise cycle
13. Terror Point (2008)
14. Terre de feu, terre de sang (2009)
15. Le Feu de la Discorde (2009)

The setting of La compagnie des glaces also bears close similarity to that of the 1982 French comics series Le Transperceneige, adapted as the film Snowpiercer in 2013.

=== TV series ===
La Compagnie des glaces was adapted as a youth television series in 2006 in a low-budget French-Canadian co-production, titled Grand Star in English. The main character, Cal Ragg, was played by Tyler Johnston. The plot of the 26 episodes that were produced is substantially different from that of the novels.

=== Anime ===
La Compagnie des glaces also inspired the 26-episode anime series Overman King Gainer (2002) by Yoshiyuki Tomino, the creator of Gundam.
