= Transarctica =

1993 video game

- Cover art by Rodney Matthews
- Developer: Silmarils
- Publisher: Silmarils
- Designer: André Rocques
- Programmer: André Rocques; Louis-Marie Rocques; Michel Pernot
- Platforms: Amiga, Atari ST, Falcon, MS-DOS, Macintosh
- Release: 1993
- Genres: Action-adventure, strategy
- Mode: Single-player

Transarctica (or Arctic Baron) is a 1993 video game made by the French company Silmarils for the Amiga and ported to IBM PC compatibles, Atari ST, Macintosh and Atari Falcon.

== Plot ==
The story is based on the post-apocalyptic science fiction novel series La Compagnie des glaces by the French writer Georges-Jean Arnaud.

In the 21st century, mankind is being ravaged by the greenhouse effect. A last-ditch effort to counteract it is designed and executed. It works far too well.

Centuries if not millennia later, the planet is entirely covered in a thick, opaque cloud layer. Giant wolf packs roam the frozen wastes, and the mammoth has re-emerged from the elephant stock. Mankind ekes out a living in a few handfuls of settlements, connected by a network of massive armored trains. The network in turn is in the hands of the gargantuan Viking Union, which is merciless towards threats to its power. A few radicals, though, are willing to attempt a change, and managing to hijack a train of the Union, the Transarctica, they set out in search of the "sun".

== Gameplay ==
The game is divided into two modes; exploration and combat.

=== Exploration ===
The train roams Eurasia and North Africa using its various facilities and tools, gathering coal for currency and fuel, visiting towns to trade and to enhance the train, and searching for clues for its quest. The dystopic setting is well integrated, for instance, using slave labor is necessary to complete the game.

The interface is original but cumbersome. It was criticized for the inefficiency of trading in comparison to mining.

=== Combat ===
The Viking Union is out for blood, and meeting with another train triggers a simple battle mode. Battles are real-time but slow-paced and may be dull at first. However, the amount of elements to handle in a battle multiplies over time - though this hardly helps the common mop-up period at the end.

The two sides are positioned on parallel tracks some distance away from each other. Maneuvering is limited to horizontal movement. Combat assets include cannons (to attack enemy wagons), machine guns (to mow down ground troops, on both sides if timed poorly), infantry (jacks of all trades to operate on and in between trains, attack ground troops, set charges on hostile wagons and clear them from friendly ones) and mammoth cavalry (to attack ground troops and to shield and transport infantry). All other wagons, save the locomotives, are dead weight.

Combat is won when the enemy is disarmed. The train is then looted for intact wagons and materials, and the contents of destroyed wagons are written off. The game is lost if the Transarctica loses a vital wagon. All engagements can be expected to take several minutes.

== Reception ==
Computer Gaming World in May 1994 criticized the train controls as both too simple and "intentionally annoying" and train combat as "painfully slow", and mentioned other "annoying, rough edges". The magazine concluded that the game's "blemishes derail an otherwise original and delightful premise".

== See also ==
- Snowpiercer (graphic novel series) and Snowpiercer - graphic novel and film respectively with a similar premise of environmental collapse and trains as primary travel.
