= Alpha 8 =

1978 anthology edited by Robert Silverberg

- Editor: Robert Silverberg
- Language: English
- Genre: Science fiction
- Publisher: Berkley Publishing Corporation
- Publication date: November 1977
- Publication place: United States
- Media type: Print (paperback)
- Pages: 242
- ISBN: 0425035611
- OCLC: 3712033
- Preceded by: Alpha 7
- Followed by: Alpha 9

Alpha 8 is a science fiction anthology edited by American writer Robert Silverberg, first published as a paperback original by Berkley Medallion in November 1977. No further editions have been issued.

== Contents ==
- Introduction by Robert Silverberg
- "A Dusk of Idols" by James Blish (Amazing 1961)
- "The Human Operators" by Harlan Ellison and A. E. van Vogt (F&SF 1971)
- "Think Only This of Me" by Michael Kurland (Galaxy 1973)
- "The Short Ones" by Raymond E. Banks (F&SF 1955)
- "Warm" by Robert Sheckley (Galaxy 1953)
- "When the Change-Winds Blow" by Fritz Leiber (F&SF 1964)
- "One Face" by Larry Niven (Galaxy 1965)
- "The Man Who Lost the Sea" by Theodore Sturgeon (F&SF 1959)
- "The Happiest Creature" by Jack Williamson (Star Science Fiction Stories No.2 1953)
- "Klysterman's Silent Violin" by Michael A. Rogers (Analog 1972)
- "The New Reality" by Charles L. Harness (Thrilling Wonder Stories 1950)

"The Man Who Lost the Sea" was nominated for the 1960 Hugo Award for Best Short Fiction. "When the Change-Winds Blow" is part of Leiber's "Change War" series.

== Reception ==
Writing in The New York Times Book Review, Gerald Jonas praised the anthology, saying "One would think that the back files of the pulp magazines had been so thoroughly combed by earlier anthologists that there is nothing of value left. One would be wrong. There are 11 stories in this collection. Seven seem first rate." Jonas singled out Blish's "A Dusk of Idols" as the best story in the anthology, describing it as a "brief excursion into nightmare, told with complete stylistic control by an author who knew what to put in and what to leave out".
