= Raymond E. Banks =

American writer

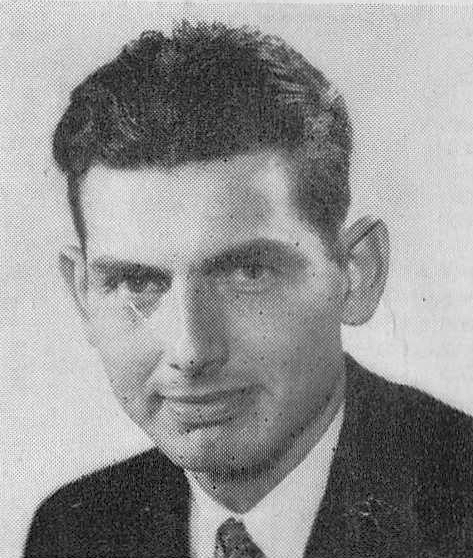
Raymond E Banks c. 1955

Raymond Eugene Banks (8 November 1918 – 3 August 1996) was an American science fiction writer active in the 1950s and 60s.

Most of his work was signed "Raymond E. Banks," but he also used slight variations of his name (such as "Ray Banks", "Ray E. Banks", "R. E. Banks", and "Ramond Banks"); he also (rarely) wrote under the pen names "Fred Freair" and "Ralph Burch".

In a brief biographical note in the 1977 anthology Alpha 8, Robert Silverberg described him as "one of the most promising of the postwar crop [of SF writers]", but also noted that "his name is rarely mentioned today." According to the note, Banks had sold a fantasy story to Esquire soon after his demobilization in 1946, and had begun writing full-time in 1952. During the next ten years, he published around forty SF stories, mostly in what Silverberg termed "fairly ephemeral magazines" (such as Dynamic Science Fiction); he also regularly appeared in the higher-profile Astounding and Galaxy.

The SF Encyclopedia characterized Banks' style as "sex-dominated planetary romances or space operas," though this was mainly in reference to his novels; his shorter fiction was more varied, and was described as somewhat reminiscent of the work of A. E. van Vogt. His stories often featured E. E. Smith-style grand-scale space battles, but also explored social and political themes, with occasional elements of horror.

Around 1960, Banks attempted to break into hardboiled crime fiction with a series of detective novels starring the Mike Hammer-like gumshoe Sam King. These were not successful, and his output decreased significantly after 1961, petering out almost completely by the seventies; his last three novels were sexually-explicit genre-exploitation pieces published by Hustler between 1978 and 1980.

== Bibliography ==
- "The Sad Room" (Esquire, 1946)
- Never Trust an Intellectual (Dynamic Science Fiction, 1953)
- Ixtl Igo, Son! (1953)
- The Happiness Effect (Astounding, 1953)
- This Side Up (1954) (as R. E. Banks)
- The Work-Out Planet (1954) (as R. E. Banks)
- Christmas Trombone (1954)
- Ticket to the Stars (1954)
- "The Littlest People" (Galaxy, 1954)
- Act of Passion (1954)
- The Watchers (1954)
- "This Side Up" (Galaxy, 1954)
- Life of a Salesman (1954) (as Fred Freair)
- Men of the Ocean (1955) (as R. E. Banks)
- The Earthlight Commandos (1955)
- Disaster Committee (1955)
- The Short Ones (1955)
- The Ear-Friend (1955) (as R. E. Banks)
- Genus: Little Monster (1955) (as R. E. Banks)
- The Critic (1955)
- The Instigators (1956) (as R. E. Banks)
- "Double Dome" (Galaxy, 1957)
- Hunt and Strike (1957)
- "Payload" (Galaxy, 1957)
- Natural Frequency (1959)
- More Like Home (1959)
- Rabbits to the Moon (1959)
- The Twenty Friends of William Shaw (1960)
- To Be Continued (1960)
- "Transstar" (Galaxy, 1960)
- The Revenant (1960)
- The Happiest Missile (1961)
- Buttons (1964)
- The Sea-Water Papers (1964)
- Deliver the Man! (1966) (as Ray E. Banks)
- The City That Loves You (1969) (as Ray Banks)
- Walter Perkins Is Here! (1970)
- Lust of the Swampmen (novel, as by Ralph Burch, 1978; aka Daryl: Skull Keep of the Primal Clan (1978); aka The Savage Princess (1980))
- Lust in Space (novel, as by Ralph Burch, 1978; aka Ultimate Transform (1978, as Ramond Banks); aka The Moon Rapers (1980, as Ramond Banks)
- Duplicate Lovers (novel, by Ralph Burch, 1980
