= Grand Star =

- Created by: Paolo Barzman, David Carayon
- Based on: La Compagnie des glaces by Georges-Jean Arnaud
- Starring: Tyler Johnston, Kyle Labine, Tammy Hui, Peter Hudson, Gerard James, Joe Sheridan
- Countries of origin: Canada; France; Belgium
- No. of episodes: 26

Production
- Running time: approx. 26 minutes

Original release
- Network: Space

Grand Star (La Compagnie des Glaces in France) is a 2007 Canadian / French / Belgian co-production science fiction television series loosely based on the novel series La Compagnie des glaces by the French writer Georges-Jean Arnaud. It was filmed in Wallers-Arenberg, France, and originally broadcast in Canada on Space and in France on France 2.

A multiplayer strategy game based on the TV series universe was launched in 2007. In the game, players compete by using their trains to gather money for energy source control.

== Synopsis ==
The series is set in a post-apocalyptic world 100 years after a cataclysmic event plunges the Earth into darkness and an ice age. The world consists of stations connected by a network of railway lines, and the inhabitants are governed by railway companies who tell them that the sun had turned supernova and became extinguished. The show centers on a community of people who lived on a station called Grand Star, as well as other people who still believe in the sun called Renewers, and people of the cold who can survive in the icy world outside. The story revolves around Cal Ragg, who believes he can bring the sun back, and his friends Suki and Kurt Masters.

== Cast ==
- Tyler Johnston – Cal Ragg
- Tammy Hui – Suki
- Kyle Labine – Kurt Masters
- James Gerard – Lieutenant Damien
- David Daouda – Special Pointman
- Joe Sheridan – CEO Palidor
- Peter Hudson – Liam Ragg
- Susan Gilmore – Tara Masters
- Sophie Ann Rooney – Margot
- John Flanders – Governor Cleary
- Marie Blanchet – Nara
- Jean-Pierre Stewart – Dr. Hamsun
- Jérémie Petrus – Jonah

== Episode list ==
1. L'immense lumière
2. L'origine de Cal
3. Un nouveau commandant
4. NARA
5. Les cobayes
6. Un canon pour le soleil
7. Un début de rébellion
8. Détenu dans le froid
9. Le prisonnier de Palidor
10. L'exode
11. La nouvelle station
12. La tempête de la vérité
13. A la recherche des rénovateurs
14. Coupure de courant
15. Le fugitif
16. Marcus
17. L'évasion
18. Jonah
19. Les masques blancs
20. Le jugement de Zel
21. Lavage de cerveau
22. Une nouvelle recrue
23. Les vestiges du passé
24. Les rénovateurs
25. La destinée de Cal
26. La lumière chaude
