= Hellstrom's Hive =

1973 science fiction novel by Frank Herbert

- Cover of the first edition
- Author: Frank Herbert
- Cover artist: David K. Stone
- Language: English
- Genre: Science fiction
- Publisher: Doubleday
- Publication date: 1973
- Publication place: United States
- Media type: Print (hardcover and paperback)
- Pages: 332 pp.

Hellstrom's Hive is a 1973 science fiction novel by Frank Herbert. It is about a secret group of humans who model their lives upon social insects and the unsettling events that unfold after they are discovered by a deep undercover agency of the U.S. government.

== Plot ==
Dr. Nils Hellstrom, an entomologist, is a successful film maker and influential scientific advisor with strong political ties. Living and working with a small staff on a farm in rural Oregon, he attracts the attention of an unnamed government organisation when documents are discovered that hint of cult-like activities and a secret weapon project.

An operative from the government is sent, but is quickly assassinated by Hellstrom's operatives. Further operatives are sent, and it is revealed that the farm is situated above a vast system of tunnels and caves, hosting a hive-like subterranean society of nearly 50,000 specialized hybrid human-insect workers. Hellstrom, thanks to advanced bioengineering, has been the appointed hive leader for more than 100 years. He is completely convinced of the superiority of the hive and its abandonment of conventional morals and ethics: sexuality or violence, indeed, any individual action, is rated strictly on whether it strengthens or weakens the hive as a whole. The government spies soon learn the hive has progressed to using sexual "stumps," both male and female—"the stump of a human body from about the waist to the knees" — as a method of harvesting "wild" genes or maintaining certain breeding lines when the individuals are no longer trustworthy members of the hive. The hive has also developed a secret weapon that it will use to displace humans as the dominant intelligent species on the planet.

The story is told from various perspectives of members of both the nameless organization investigating the farm and plotting against each other, as well as Hellstrom and several high-ranking hive members collectively dealing with the threat of being discovered and probably extinguished by "the wild ones". In the end, the hive's weapon project is ready to protect the hive and the upcoming 'swarming'—the gradual displacement of individual-based humanity.

== Inspiration ==
David L. Wolper's quasi-documentary film The Hellstrom Chronicle, released in 1971, was the inspiration for Herbert's novel. In an interview with Tim O'Reilly, Herbert stated: "I said, 'In terms of what we want now, as we think of our world now, what would be the most horrible kind of civilization you could imagine?' And then I said, 'Now I will make... [the members of that civilization] the heroes of the story, by taking negative elements of the surrounding society and treating them as the villain.' That creates a very peculiar kind of tension."

== Reception ==
David Pringle gave Hellstrom's Hive three stars out of four and called it "a powerful novel".

== Awards ==
In 1978, Hellstrom's Hive won the Prix Tour-Apollo Award for best science fiction novel published in French.
