= Overman King Gainer =

Japanese anime television series and its manga adaptation

OVERMANキングゲイナー (Ōbāman Kingu Geinā)
- Created by: Yoshiyuki Tomino inspired by La Compagnie des glaces by Georges-Jean Arnaud
- Anime television series
- Directed by: Yoshiyuki Tomino
- Produced by: Michiko Suzuki; Yoshitaka Kawaguchi; Jun Yukawa
- Written by: Ichirō Ōkouchi
- Music by: Kohei Tanaka
- Studio: Sunrise
- Licensed by: NA: Discotek Media
- Original network: Animax, WOWOW
- Original run: September 7, 2002 – March 22, 2003
- Episodes: 26
- Manga
- Written by: Yoshiyuki Tomino
- Illustrated by: Yoshihiro Nakamura
- Published by: Media Factory
- Magazine: Comic Flapper
- Original run: May 2, 2002 – March 5, 2008
- Volumes: 7

Overman King Gainer (OVERMAN(オーバーマン)キングゲイナー, Ōbāman Kingu Geinā) is a mecha anime television series, created and directed by Yoshiyuki Tomino, written by Ichirō Ōkouchi, and featuring character designs by Yoshihiro Nakamura, Kinu Nishimura and Ken'ichi Yoshida. The series ran from September 7, 2002, to March 22, 2003, on Japan's WOWOW network, spanning a total of 26 episodes. Following the 2012 closure of Bandai Entertainment, Sunrise announced at Otakon 2013, that Sentai Filmworks has acquired Overman King Gainer, along with a handful of other former BEI titles.

== Plot ==
The setting and plot of Overman King Gainer are a loose adaptation of the novel series La Compagnie des glaces by the French writer Georges-Jean Arnaud. After an environmental cataclysm, much of the world's population retreated into domed cities called Domepolis, which are run by an organization known as "London IMA" (International Management Authority) and its police arm, "Saint Regan". However, the Domepoli are maintained and supplied by privatized firms such as the "Siberian Railroad Company". Many years have passed since the cataclysm, and many have begun to believe that the world environment has recovered sufficiently enough for humans to begin living outside Domepoli. As such, some inhabitants begin planning Exoduses to leave these cities and to resettle their ancestral homelands. However, this does not sit well with the London IMA or the private firms that monopolize trade between the Domepoli, as the loss of people would not only lead to a loss in tax and trade revenue, but if the Exodus were to be successful, it would show the people that it was no longer necessary to rely on the London IMA or the private firms for survival. They fiercely oppose any Exoduses, spreading propaganda on the evils effects of Exoduses on the Earth's environment, and using military force to prevent any attempted Exodus.

Overmen are powerful biomechanical mecha with unique special abilities known as Overskills, which can range from mind control to stopping time. Overmen are typically reserved for elite soldiers and are rarely seen in private hands due to their scarcity, having been created with lost technology from before the cataclysm. Most military and private groups typically utilize the more primitive Silhouette Machines, which are entirely mechanical.

The story begins in a Domepolis in Siberia, where championship video game player Gainer Sanga is arrested by Siberian Railroad policewoman Adette Kistler on suspicion of being an Exodus member. Ironically he is not, but his friends Sara Kodama and Bello Korissha along with his schoolteacher Mamado Azaf are members of the Gauli team, a militia unit of the local Exodus group. At the same time, Exodus expert and coordinator Gain Bijou lets himself be arrested by the Siberian Railroad police as part of his plan to infiltrate the city and steal an Overman for use in defending the Exodus.

Gain is placed in the same prison cell as Gainer, and when Gain initiates his escape, only Gainer is willing to escape as well. They infiltrate the castle of Duke Medaiyu and steal an Overman in the Duke's secret museum collection, which Gainer logs into as his video game handle: "King Gainer". As Gainer gets the hang of piloting a real Overman, he and Gain encounter shut-in Princess Anna, the Duke's daughter, who supports the Exodus and wants to see the world and people other than her tutor, Lioubov Smettana. Using an annual festival presented by idol singer and co–Exodus leader, Meeya Laujin, as cover, the Exodus executes their plan: take much of the Domepolis, block by block, using heavy hauler machines called Silhouette Mammoths and move them over 3000 km across the Siberian tundra to their ancestral homeland, "Yapan". As the Exodus moves out, the Siberian Railroad police chief, Yassaba Jin, mobilizes his forces to stop them. Other obstacles to the Exodus are Kistler's and Jin's subordinates Jaboli Mariela, Kejinan Datto, and Enge Gam, Siberian Railroad president Kizz Munt, Saint Regan policemen Asuham Boone and Zakki Bronco, and Overman aces Cynthia Lane and Kashmir Valle.

== Characters ==
=== Yapan Exodus ===
Gainer Sanga

- Voiced by: Hirofumi Nojima (Japanese), Darrel Guilbeau (English)

Gainer is the headstrong main protagonist of the series. He lived his days as a high school truant and online gaming champion before meeting Gain Bijou, an Exodus specialist under the captivity of the Siberian Railway forces. Gainer initially opposes the Yapan Exodus, but through a series of coincidences and his connections with Gain and Sara, he suddenly finds himself soldiering for their cause. He pilots the long-haired Overman dubbed "King Gainer" after his online gaming handle. Despite being considered a "general purpose" Overman, King Gainer is frequently noted to be far faster and more powerful than an Overman of its class should be. This is eventually revealed to be because King Gainer is actually part of the same class of Overman as the legendary Overdevil, which makes it capable of using the Overfreeze and Overheat Overskills.

Sara Kodama

- Voiced by: Ai Kobayashi (Japanese), Olivia O'Connor (English)

Sara Kodama is a diligent high school student and member of the Gauli Squad, a rebel soldier faction which supports the Yapan Exodus. Her work ethic is matched only by her heart, which she devotes mainly to Gainer. Her plan upon completion of the Yapan Exodus is to cultivate a farm. She primarily pilots a Panther-type Silhouette Machine as a scout.

Gain Bijou

- Voiced by: Otoya Kawano (Japanese), Ron Allen (English)

A self-proclaimed 'Exodus specialist', Gain is an expert sniper and important member of the Yapan Exodus. His nickname, 'Black Southern Cross', was earned by his reputation for leaving bullet wounds in the shape of a cross within his fallen enemies. His affable demeanor outside the battlefield is pierced upon discussion of his mysterious past. He pilots the Silhouette Machine named Gottiko, which is mounted with a large railgun and has an Overman's left arm, later revealed to be one of the left arms of the legendary Early Overman Brunhilde. He later pilots the pseudo-Overman known as Emperanza, which is built from both Overman and Silhouette Machine parts, including the salvaged left arm of Brunhilde. Brunhilde's arm gives either machine limited control over gravity, typically used as a barrier against attacks.

Princess Ana Medaiyu

- Voiced by: Noriko Kito (Japanese), Michelle Ruff (English)

Princess Ana is the daughter of Duke Medaiyu. Her lively nature and insatiable curiosity lead her to join the Yapan Exodus under the guise of a hostage. She owns three intelligent pet squirrels that heed her every command.

Lioubov Smettana

- Voiced by: Ai Futamura (Japanese), Julie Ann Taylor (English)

Ana's kind, brave, and loyal retainer. She has trouble keeping up with the princess at times and wishes to protect her at all costs.

Adette Kistler

- Voiced by: Marika Hayashi (Japanese), Wendee Lee (English)

A commander of the Siberian Railway forces who mistakenly arrests Gainer just before the Yapan Exodus commences because of a case of mistaken identity. When the Yapan Exodus sets off, Adette infiltrates the traveling city units in order to capture Princess Ana. Gain quickly thwarts her attempt, and with nowhere else to go, she begrudgingly starts a new life on the Exodus as a high school teacher for Gainer and Sara's class. She also moves in with Gainer to his chagrin. She is a tough and shrewd woman, but childlike in her temper and affection toward men. She eventually begins commanding a troop of Exodus soldiers fanatically devoted to her, piloting a Dorbeck-type Silhouette Machine painted in her signature red.

Bello Korissha

- Voiced by: Shusaku Otake (Japanese), Derek Stephen Prince (English first), Dave Mallow (English second)

A fellow Gauli Squad member and classmate of Gainer and Sara. He has feelings for Sara, but never seems to show them outside random acts of jealously toward Gainer. Despite this, he remains good friends with Gainer and Sara and a helpful ally on the battlefield. He typically commands the Bachclone, the lead Silhouette Mammoth vehicle towing the city blocks, which is also typically where King Gainer is stored.

Meeya Laujin

- Voiced by: Yumiko Nakanishi (Japanese), Kate Davis (English)

A quasi-religious figure idolized by Exodus supporters, who is a key feature at festivals as she sings and dances. Despite her apparent status as an important figurehead, she is often treated more like a pop idol and has a ditzy and easily distracted nature.

Louvre Won Dara

- Voiced by: Masako Chiba (Japanese), Kate Davis (English)

Meeya's handler and manager.

Mamado Azaf

- Voiced by: Rintaro Nishi (Japanese), David Orozco (English)

Hughes Gauli

- Voiced by: Toru Kusano (Japanese), Tony Oliver (English)

Hughes is the commander of the Gauli Squad, trained in the way of the ninja. He'll stop at nothing to support the Yapan Exodus.

Cona Madaya

- Voiced by: Mayumi Honda (Japanese), Julie Maddalena (English)

Cona is the temperamental young mechanic who maintains the Yapan Exodus Silhouette Machines and King Gainer. Early on, she competes with Lioubov for Gain's affection, but quickly moves on to capture the attention of Gain's former comrade.

Nann

- Voiced by: Jun Irie (Japanese), Midge Mayes (English)

Toun

- Voiced by: Yohei Obayashi (Japanese), Dave Mallow (English first), Jim Taggert (English second)

Elizabeth

- Voiced by: Tomoko Hayashi (Japanese), Alexu Greene (English)

==== Five Wisemen ====
Gach Wige

- Voiced by: Kazuhiko Kishino (Japanese), William Frederick Knight (English)

Citran Vie

- Voiced by: Naoki Shirakami (Japanese), Jane Alan (English)

Manman Douton

- Voiced by: Mugihito (Japanese), Anthony Mozdy (English first), Joey Lotsko (English second)

Pelhar Pey

- Voiced by: Hiroaki Harakawa (Japanese), Steve Kramer (English)

=== Wulgusk Domepolis ===
Duke Medaiyu

- Voiced by: Harumi Munechika (Japanese), Russel Thor (English)

Ana Medaiyu's father and the leader of the Domepolis from which the Yapan Exodus departs. He is King Gainer's original owner, having kept it in a secret private collection before Gainer steals it during the Yapan Exodus' escape.

=== Siberian Railroad Authority ===
Cynthia Lane

- Voiced by: Rena Mizuki (Japanese), Tara Malone (English)

Initially Gainer's online gaming buddy with the handle "Queen," Cynthia is actually an elite Siberian Railway soldier, raised and favored by Kizz Munt. She is almost always eating candy and treats everything, including piloting and dating, as a game to conquer because of her sheltered upbringing. Her trademark whimsy and inability to take things seriously comes with major consequences, as she ends up hurting a Gainer later in the series during a friendly piloting competition between Overmen. Cynthia's natural piloting ability is said to have come from her mother, whose name is never mentioned; her only living relative appears to be Martina Lane. The shape-shifting Dominator is her Overman of choice.

Yassaba Jin

- Voiced by: Hisao Egawa (Japanese), Michael McConnohie (English)

A Siberian Railway squad commander who originally pilots the time-stopping Overman Rushrod and later the stealthy Overman Blackmail. He is the first major opposition the Yapan Exodus faces. After being defeated, Blackmail's Overcoat armor is salvaged and occasionally outfitted on King Gainer, allowing it to use Blackmail's stealth ability. During his escape from the Yapan Exodus, he meets a young fortune-telling girl in the city blocks and they decide to Exodus together to her homeland in the south. He is only 32 years old despite looking much older.

Kashmir Valle

- Voiced by: Keiji Fujiwara (Japanese), Chris Kent (English)

The operations director of the Siberian Railway, a flamboyant man obsessed with maintaining the perfect "diagram," meeting any deviations to his meticulous scheduling with unchecked rage. He primarily pilots Netter-type Overmen with Overskills that affect the minds of opponents and avoids direct combat whenever possible. He also once pilots the Antlion, a quadrupedal drilling Overman.

Jaboli Mariela

- Voiced by: Maki Tamura (Japanese), Mia Bradly (English)

A Siberian Railway officer who is initially Adette's direct subordinate. She is noted to become fanatically devoted to anyone in power, clinging to whoever is the highest authority at the time.

Kejinan Datto

- Voiced by: Hiroshi Kitazawa (Japanese), David Lelyveld (English)

A Siberian Railway officer obsessed with gaining ranks and status. He is partnered with Enge and is denoted by his ugly face and bad posture. He is usually controlling a Silhouette Machine, but is given an Under-Golame Overman when briefly under Asuham Boone's command and once pilots the Overman Mexbrute, which can create illusions.

Kizz Munt

- Voiced by: Seiji Sasaki (Japanese), James Lyon (English)

President of the Siberian Railway. Despite his eccentric personality, he is actually a fairly ruthless man who mercilessly stops any Exodus that could threaten his organization.

Enge Gam

- Voiced by: Tsuyoshi Koyama (Japanese), Richard George (English)

A Siberian Railway officer partnered with Kejinan, denoted by his eyepatch and slightly more professional demeanor compared to his partner. Though he is usually behind the controls of a Silhouette Machine, he is given an Under-Golame Overman when he is briefly under Asuham Boone's command.

Ariel Nielson

- Voiced by: Hiroshi Takahashi (Japanese), Kurt Strauss (English)

=== London IMA ===
Asuham Boone

- Voiced by: Takehito Koyasu (Japanese), Doug Erholtz (English)

A high-ranking member of the Saint Regan police force who is dispatched to help stop the Yapan Exodus. His only real objective is to capture Gain and force him to confront his sister, Karin, who has conceived and raised a child from a one-night stand with Gain. His obsession with Gain ultimately degrades into homicidal madness, culminating in him intentionally awakening the Overdevil to destroy the world. His plans are derailed after the Overdevil is defeated and Karin suddenly arrives to drag him home. He initially pilots a Golame-type Overman, which is a mass-produced London IMA model for high-ranking pilots. The Golame is later replaced by a Power Golame, a stronger variant with more armor. He later acquires the Overman Jinba, which features an Overskill allowing it to "steal" anything within a certain range. He steals the Dominator from Cynthia later on.

Zakki Bronco

- Voiced by: Takashi Nakamura (Japanese), Richard Hayworth (English)

Asuham's direct subordinate, who typically pilots a Golame-type Overman.

=== Others ===
Karin Boone

- Voiced by: Fumiko Orikasa (Japanese), Lynn Fischer (English)

Karin is Asuham's sister and Gain's former lover. After a one-night stand, she ends up conceiving a daughter. However, she has no lingering feelings for Gain and tracks Asuham down to drag him home.

Martina Lane

- Voiced by: Toshiko Sawada (Japanese), Barbara Goodson (English)

Cynthia Lane's grandmother, who was frozen by the Overdevil's Overfreeze several years ago. She is discovered in the Crystal of Agate fortress, which held the Overdevil in stasis, and freed, joining the Yapan Exodus to help them take down the Overdevil.

== Game appearances ==
Overman King Gainer is included in Another Century's Episode 3 for the PlayStation 2 and Another Century's Episode R for the PlayStation 3. The series made its debut into the long-running Super Robot Wars series in Super Robot Wars Z and has also appeared in Super Robot Wars K for the Nintendo DS.
