= Tyler Johnston =

Canadian actor (born 1987)

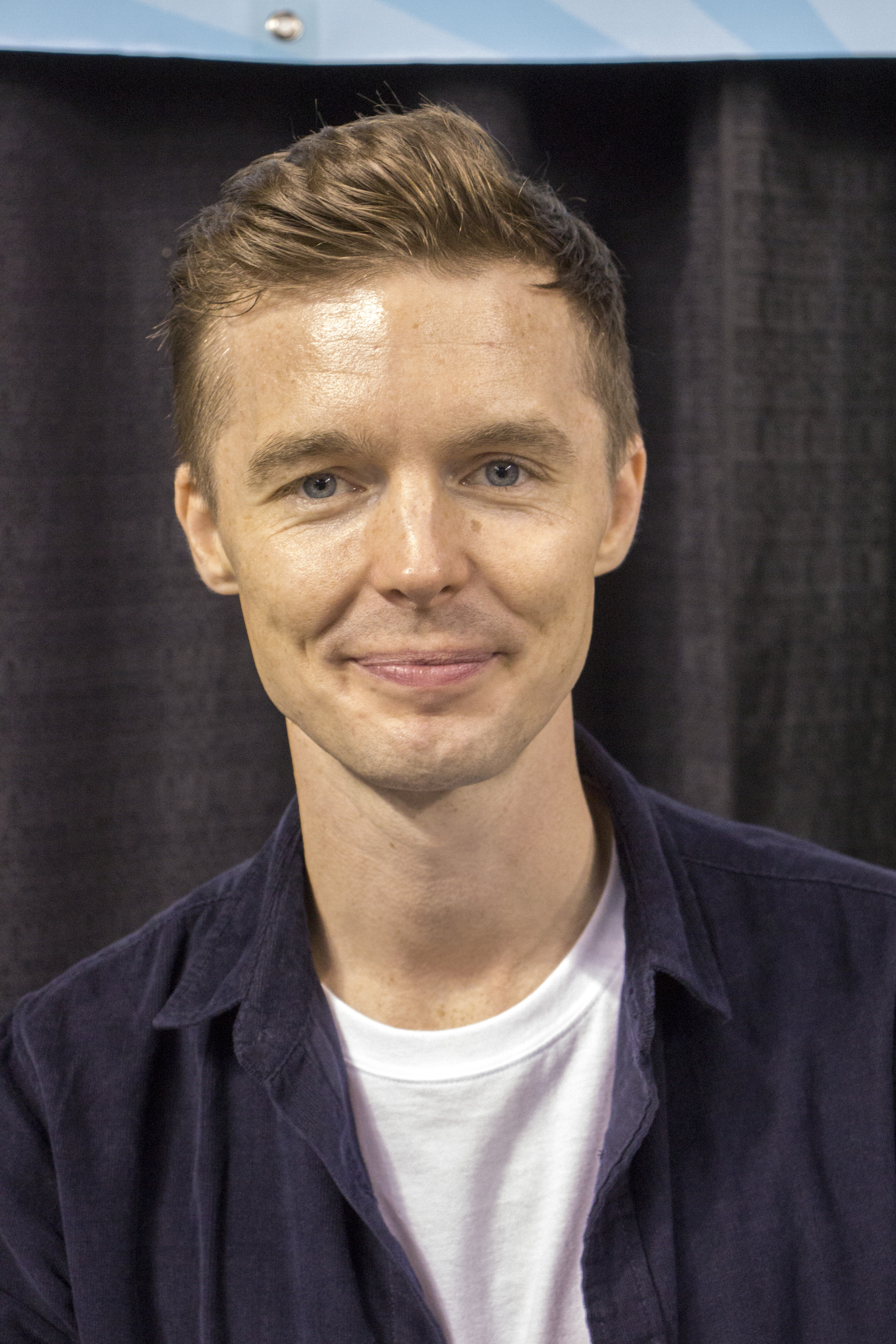
- Johnson at the 2023 O Con Expo
- Born: June 14, 1987 (age 39); New Westminster, British Columbia, Canada
- Occupation: Actor
- Years active: 2004–present

Tyler Johnston (born June 14, 1987) is a Canadian actor. He is best known for his role as Stewart on the comedy series Letterkenny and Danny Lubbe in Less Than Kind.

== Career ==
Johnston's credits include appearances in the television series The Killing, Grand Star, Supernatural, Motive, Saving Hope, and Godiva's, and the films The Odds, The Phantoms, and Decoys 2: Alien Seduction. In 2025, Johnston guest-starred as Graham Benning on the American action drama television series Tracker starring Justin Hartley, in the episode "Eat the Rich" of Season 3.

Johnston was nominated in the Best Supporting Actor in a Comedy Series category for Less Than Kind at both the 1st Canadian Screen Awards and the 2nd Canadian Screen Awards. In 2014, he was also nominated in the Best Lead Actor in a Television Film or Miniseries category for The Phantoms. In 2016, he was nominated by the Montreal International Wreath Film Festival Awards in the Best Actor category for his role as Edward K. Wehling, Jr. in the short film 2BR02B: To Be or Naught to Be, based on the story of the same name by Kurt Vonnegut.

== Filmography ==
=== Film ===
Year	Title	Role	Notes
2007	Decoys 2: Alien Seduction	Sam Compton	
2008	Slap Shot 3: The Junior League	Alex Gorrall	
2011	Pressed	Jesse	
2011	The Odds	Desson Orr	
2012	Becoming Redwood	Josh	
2014	Feed the Gods	Kris	
2016	2BR02B: To Be or Naught to Be	Edward K. Wehling Jr	
2018	The Age of Adulting	Blake	
2018	Rabbit	Mathew	
2024	Last We Left Off	Coro	

=== Television ===
Year	Title	Role	Notes
2004	Romeo!	Blake	Episode: "A Matter of Principal"
2004	Life as We Know It	Geek	Episode: "Pilot Junior"
2005	Zixx: Level Two	Markko	4 episodes
2005–2006	The L Word	Various roles	3 episodes
2005–2013	Supernatural	Various roles	4 episodes
2006	Godiva's	Adrian	5 episodes
2006	Reunion	Henry	2 episodes
2006	Totally Awesome	Student #2	Television film
2007	Blood Ties	Lee	Episode: "We'll Meet Again"
2007–2008	Grand Star	Cal Ragg	26 episodes
2008	Ogre	Matthew	Television film
2008	Smallville	Randy Klein	Episode: "Prey"
2008	Amber Alert: Terror on the Highway	Pate	Television film
2009	Polar Storm	Shane Mayfield	Television film
2009	V	College Kid #2	Episode: "Pilot"
2010	Flashpoint	Trent Butler	Episode: "Follow the Leader"
2010	Running Wilde	Young Steve	Episode: "Pilot"
2010–2012	Less Than Kind	Danny Lubbe	23 episodes
2011	The Haunting Hour: The Series	Jerry	2 episodes
2012	Wrath of Grapes: The Don Cherry Story II	Young Don Cherry	2 episodes
2012	The Killing	Alexi Giffords	5 episodes
2012	Saving Hope	Eddie Marks	Episode: "The Fight"
2012	The Phantoms	Corey Boucher	Television film
2013	Motive	Tom Caron	Episode: "Creeping Tom"
2013	Forever 16	Connor	Television film
2014	Grumpy Cat's Worst Christmas Ever	Gill Brockman	Television film
2014	Christmas Icetastrophe	TJ	Television film
2015	The Hillywood Show	Dancer	Episode: "Supernatural Parody"
2016	Aurora Teagarden Mysteries	Harley Dimmoch	Episode: "The Julius House"
2016	Shut Eye	Ted	7 episodes
2016–2023	Letterkenny	Stewart	74 episodes
2017	Story of a Girl	Tommy	Television film
2021	Two Sentence Horror Stories	Patrick	Episode: "Instinct"
2021	A Picture Perfect Wedding	Josh Taylor-Hall	Television film
2024	Hudson & Rex	Tucker Keefe	Episode: "Dogged Pursuit"
2025	Twisted Metal	Deacon	3 episodes
