= The Seed of Earth =

1962 novel by Robert Silverberg

First edition, cover art by Ed Valigursky.

The Seed of Earth is a science fiction novel by American writer Robert Silverberg, originally published in Galaxy Science Fiction in June 1962, and expanded as an Ace Double in 1962. The novel takes place in the near future, and tells the story of a group of individuals, selected randomly by a government-sponsored lottery, who are forced to leave Earth and establish a colony on a distant world. Once there, four of the colonists are abducted by the planet's native inhabitants, and must put aside their differences and work together in order to survive.

== Publication history ==
Silverberg originally published it as the short story "The Winds of Siros" in the September, 1957 issue of Venture Science Fiction. He first enlarged it into the novella The Seed of Earth for Galaxy magazine in 1962, before publishing it as a further enlarged standalone novel in 1962.

It is unrelated to another of Silverberg's stories which has also been published under the title The Seed of Earth in the April, 1958 issue of Super-Science Fiction, before it was re-published under the title Journey's End in the Silverberg collections Dimension Thirteen (1969) and World of a Thousand Colors (1982).
