= The Man Who Lost the Sea =

Science fiction short story by Theodore Sturgeon

- Short story by Theodore Sturgeon
- Country: USA
- Language: English
- Genre: Science fiction

Publication
- Published in: The Magazine of Fantasy and Science Fiction
- Publication type: Periodical
- Publisher: Mercury Publications
- Media type: Magazine
- Publication date: October 1959

"The Man Who Lost the Sea" is a science fiction short story by American writer Theodore Sturgeon. Originally published in the October 1959 issue of The Magazine of Fantasy and Science Fiction, it was nominated for (but did not win) the 1960 Hugo Award for Best Short Fiction.

Writing in The Encyclopedia of Science Fiction, John Clute described "The Man Who Lost the Sea" as "strong, immeasurably complex, word-perfect and deeply fixative to the reader's memory".

== Plot summary ==
When the story opens, the reader is introduced to a boy who is showing a model helicopter to a person described as a "sick man" on a beach. As the story progresses, the models shown by the boy increase in sophistication, first a rocket plane and then an interplanetary spacecraft. The reader also learns of significant events in the boy's life, including his fascination with the Sputnik satellite and a near-drowning experience while swimming in the ocean. Eventually, the reader is told that the boy and the sick man are the same person, an injured astronaut who is regaining consciousness after a crash landing on Mars.

The story is told as a second-person narrative (i.e., "You raised your head ...", "If you were the kid ...").

== Publication history ==
Shortly after its original appearance in The Magazine of Fantasy and Science Fiction, "The Man Who Lost the Sea" appeared in issue 74 (January 1960) of the French-language magazine Fiction (under the title "L'homme qui a perdu la mer"). Its first appearance in Britain was in the October 1963 issue of Venture Science Fiction.

"The Man Who Lost the Sea" appeared in two best-of-the-year anthologies—The Best from Fantasy and Science Fiction (Ninth Series, 1960) and The Best American Short Stories, 1960, as well as being reprinted in The Fifth Annual of the Year's Best SF (1960). Since then, it has been anthologized at least eight times and has been translated into French, Italian, German and Dutch. It also appears in three collections devoted to Sturgeon's work—The Golden Helix (1979), Selected Stories (2013) and The Man Who Lost the Sea (2013); the latter two are e-books. It is the title story of volume 10 of The Complete Works of Theodore Sturgeon (2005).

The foregoing was taken from the story's listing in the Internet Speculative Fiction Database (for which see the External links section below). More detail on its publication history can be found at that listing.
