= Across a Billion Years =

1969 novel by Robert Silverberg

- Cover of the first edition, published by The Dial Press. Cover art by Emanuel Schongut.
- Author: Robert Silverberg
- Language: English
- Publisher: The Dial Press
- Publication date: 1969
- LC Class: PZ7.S5858 Ac

Across a Billion Years is a 1969 science fiction novel by American writer Robert Silverberg.

== Plot ==
Set in the year 2375, it follows Tom Rice, a young archaeologist attached to a two-year dig on the planet of Higby V. He is searching for artifacts belonging to a long-lost and ancient race known simply as The High Ones. Throughout known space, details of this billion-year-old civilization have been uncovered on many planets. What seems like a fairly straightforward expedition becomes a galactic odyssey when an artifact never seen before is discovered. This device hints that perhaps the High Ones are not extinct at all.
