= Starborne =

1996 novel by Robert Silverberg

- First edition
- Author: Robert Silverberg
- Cover artist: Bruce Jensen
- Language: English
- Genre: Science fiction
- Publisher: Bantam Spectra
- Publication date: June 1996
- Publication place: United States
- Media type: Print (Hardcover and Paperback)
- Pages: 291
- ISBN: 0-553-10264-8
- OCLC: 33277388

Starborne is a 1996 science fiction novel by American writer Robert Silverberg, an expansion of his 1973 story "Ship-Sister, Star-Sister."

== Plot summary ==
Fifty men and women set out on the Wotan to discover new habitable worlds and break free of a stagnant utopia. They are connected with Earth via a telepathic link between a crew member and her sister. However, the link is broken, stranding the Wotan far from home, where they encounter an alien presence and begin to reconsider their assumptions about life and death and the universe.

== Literary significance and reception ==
Reviews of the novel were mixed: Publishers Weekly praised Silverberg's "compelling prose" but faulted its "meandering and talky" execution.

Kirkus Reviews found it "another polished and agreeable presentation" but ultimately felt that the scenario was "overly familiar."
