= Sunrise on Mercury =

1983 book by Robert Silverberg

First edition (publ. Gollancz)

Sunrise on Mercury is a collection by Robert Silverberg published in 1983.

== Plot summary ==
Sunrise on Mercury is a collection of thirteen stories that were written from 1954 to 1979.

== Reception ==
Dave Langford reviewed Sunrise on Mercury for White Dwarf #76, and stated that "All are exceedingly slick and competent, though I wonder whether Silverberg in 1986 feels twinges of guilt about his patronizing attitude to 'primitive' aliens back in the 50s. The whole book goes down smoothly and tastes pretty good throughout. Half an hour later you'll be hungry again."

== Reviews ==
- Review by Ken Lake (1986) in Paperback Inferno, #59
