= Lost Cities and Vanished Civilizations =

Book by Robert Silverberg

- First edition
- Author: Robert Silverberg
- Publisher: Chilton
- Publication date: 1962

Lost Cities and Vanished Civilizations is a 1962 book by Robert Silverberg that deals with the then-current archaeology studies of six past civilizations. The book is divided into six chapters, and each deals with a particular civilization: Pompeii, Troy, Nicola, Babylon, Chichen Itza, and Angkor Wat. Silverberg also deals with the historical search for the past through the life works of archaeologists such as Heinrich Schliemann and Henry Rawlinson.
