= Time of the Great Freeze =

1964 novel by Robert Silverberg

Cover of the first edition. Art by Brinton Turkle.

Time of the Great Freeze is a science fiction novel by American author Robert Silverberg, first published by Holt, Rinehart and Winston in 1964. The novel concerns a group of explorers, living in an underground city somewhere in North America three hundred years after an environmental catastrophe has triggered a new Ice Age. They decide to leave their haven after making contact with London via radio transmissions. Once on the surface, they set out across the mostly frozen wasteland of North America, and eventually across the icy surface of the Atlantic Ocean, and along the way encounter descendants of survivors of the original catastrophe who were unable to seek refuge underground.
