= Those Who Watch =

1967 novel by Robert Silverberg

Cover of the first edition.

Those Who Watch is a science fiction novel by American writer Robert Silverberg, first published by Signet in 1967. The novel concerns a trio of alien explorers, each one surgically altered so as to appear outwardly human, who find themselves separated, and permanently stranded on Earth, after their ship explodes while hovering in low orbit. Each of the aliens is injured during the accident, and all are taken in and nursed back to health by kindly human beings.
