= Glass Tower (video game) =

- Developer: Gadgetcrafts
- Publisher: iDevUA 2010-2012, Gadgetcrafts 2012 - now.
- Engine: Proprietary, Cocos 2D, Cocos 2D-X
- Platforms: iOS; Android
- Release: 2009
- Genres: Puzzle, Physics, Tower collapse

Glass Tower is a video game that was created by the Ukrainian studio, Gadgetcrafts. The game requires players to destroy a tower by tapping blue blocks in order to remove them, while simultaneously aiming to avoid the red blocks. The first version was released early 2009 on the Apple AppStore.

It was followed by Glass Tower 2 which is also available on iOS only, and a few months its release, the special version made for iPad tablets was launched as Glass Tower 2 HD. The game levels and graphics were completely redesigned from scratch to provide a better fit on the iPad screen.

In May 2010 Glass Tower 2, soon after release, had been ranked as the Top #1 free app in the US App Store charts, at the period between May and June 2010 also reached Top#1 position in the grossing apps list. Glass Tower 2 HD, released a few months later, also was ranked in the Top 10 apps for iPad.

Glass Tower 3 was released a year later as a paid app, but did not have near the success as GT2. However, it includes support for both iPhone and iPad.

The last and final version was released in early 2013 and was entitled Glass Tower World. The game is available for both iOS and Android platforms as a free app.

== Critical receptions ==
TouchArcade Review gave Glass Tower 3 a rank of 3.5 stars with conclusion: Whether you've played a Glass Tower game before or are new to the series and looking for a new puzzler, Glass Tower 3 should be a title worth looking into. It's taken the success from earlier games, incorporated a ton of requested features, and then fleshed it out with enough new levels to keep you busy for quite some time. Physics-based puzzles aren't for everyone, and this game certainly won't change your mind if you're not a fan. However, if you're looking for something new, Glass Tower 3 looks to be a clear choice to check out.

Apps Games Review said "Glass Tower 3+ is a very fun, addictive game that can be learned in seconds and enjoyed instantly. It starts off very simple to allow players to have a good time, and gets challenging later on without becoming frustrating. It's a must download game for those who enjoy puzzles or who just want some quick enjoyment on the go", and gave the game 4.5 stars.

AppSafari gave GT2 2.5 stars, writing "Glass Tower 2 is a great way to stretch your mind without losing any sweat, but for a more extensive puzzle game, you may have to fork over the extra cash". CommonSenseMedia rated the game 4 out of 5 stars, commenting "If you overlook the sneaky pricing on GLASS TOWER 2, it's a really great puzzle app. You are presented with stacks of differently-shaped glass blocks, and you must eliminate all the blue blocks (by tapping and shattering them) without letting any of the red blocks fall and break. It's an incredibly simple concept, but it's [sic] simplicity makes it addictive (which makes you all the more eager to buy the additional levels).

SlideToPlay gave GT3 a 3/5 score, writing "The Glass Tower series has always been great for challenging, yet easy-to-pick-up puzzle action, and Glass Tower 3 is no different. It mostly offers more of the same, but with a few notable enhancements that make it a better overall experience than its peers." TouchArcade gave it 3.5 stars, writing "Whether you've played a Glass Tower game before or are new to the series and looking for a new puzzler, Glass Tower 3 should be a title worth looking into. It's taken the success from earlier games, incorporated a ton of requested features, and then fleshed it out with enough new levels to keep you busy for quite some time".
