= Georges-Jean Arnaud =

French writer (1928–2020)

Georges-Jean Arnaud (July 3, 1928 – April 26, 2020) was a French author.

== Biography ==
Arnaud was born in Saint-Gilles-du-Gard, Camargue, Gard. He was first published in 1971 in the science fiction magazine Anticipation from the French publisher Fleuve Noir with his story Les Croisés de Mara [The Crusaders Of Mara]. This is the first volume of a trilogy entitled Chroniques de la Longue Séparation [Chronicles of the Long Separation], in which a group of characters from the lost human colony of Mara, which had reverted to feudalism, rediscovered their origins and then embarked on a quest through space to find Earth.

Arnaud is the author of more than three hundred novels of different genres, including espionage thrillers, detective fiction, science fiction, horror, erotic fiction, and mainstream literature. His espionage fiction includes two series of note: Luc Ferran (16 novels), written under the pseudonym of "Gil Darcy" for the publisher L'Arabesque between 1963 and 1969; and Le Commander for Fleuve Noir's magazine Espionnage, with about thirty novels written between 1967 and 1980. Arnaud also wrote non-series espionage novels under the pseudonyms of "Saint-Gilles" and "Georges Murey" for Ferenczi (1958–60) and L'Arabesque (1957–65), and another fifty-odd novels under his own name for Fleuve Noir's Espionnage (1961–86).

Arnaud's best known work is La Compagnie des glaces ("The Ice Company"), a post-apocalyptic science fiction novel series set in a new ice age where railway companies rule the world. La Compagnie des glaces was adapted during 2007 into a Canadian television series entitled Grand Star, and inspired the Japanese anime and manga series Overman King Gainer, which was distributed for 26 episodes from 2002 to 2003. The series also served as the basis for the computer game Transarctica (North American title: Arctic Baron). The first novel was translated into English in 2010 as The Ice Company (ISBN 978-1-935558-31-6).

== Awards ==
His work earned a number of awards, including:

- 1952 : Prix du Quai des Orfèvres for Ne tirez pas sur l'inspecteur
- 1966 : Palme d'Or du roman d'espionnage for Les égarés
- 1977 : Prix Mystère de la critique for Enfantasme
- 1988 : Prix Apollo for La Compagnie des glaces
