= The Science Fictional Dinosaur =

1982 science fiction anthology book

The Science Fictional Dinosaur is a 1982 anthology edited by Robert Silverberg, Charles G. Waugh, and Martin H. Greenberg.

== Contents ==
The Science Fictional Dinosaur is an anthology of nine science fiction stories is centered around dinosaurs. The collection opens with Isaac Asimov's humorous "A Statue for Father" and Paul Ash's "The Wings of a Bat." Asimov's second contribution, "Day of the Hunters," carries a message about extinction and modern parallels. Harry Harrison's "The Ever-Branching Tree" reflects on childhood's detachment from history, while Brian Aldiss's "Poor Little Warrior!" delivers a critique of time-traveling hunters and the futility of escapist dreams. Poul Anderson's "Wildcat," written during the Cold War, is an indictment of ecological destruction and political paranoia. F. D. Gottfried's "Hermes to the Ages" and Silverberg's own "Our Lady of the Sauropods" suggest that dinosaurs may have possessed a wisdom or intelligence surpassing that of humanity. Robert F. Young's "When Time Was New," is a love story that bends reality to underscore its emotional truth.

== Reception ==
C. J. Henderson reviewed The Science Fictional Dinosaur for Pegasus magazine and stated that "Worth the price of the book all by itself [...] is Robert F. Young's 'When Time Was New.' Like most of Young's work, it is basically a love story, but that is not meant to demean the tale. 'When Time Was New' is a touching and clever piece of modern fiction. Although it bends the laws of probability slightly to achieve its conclusion, since that is one of the hidden points of the story, it does not matter much."

== Reviews ==
- Review by Steve Carper (1982) in Science Fiction & Fantasy Book Review, #4, May 1982
- Review by Judith Hanna (1982) in Paperback Inferno, Volume 6, Number 1
