= Prix Apollo Award =

Literary award

The Prix Tour-Apollo was an annual French juried award established in 1972 by Jacques Sadoul with the assistance of Jacques Goimard. Its name was chosen in reference to the Apollo 11 rocket. The award was given to the best science fiction novel published in France during the preceding year. Awards were given for the years 1972-1990, inclusive, and usually went to a work first published in English in the US or UK. After the award ended in 1991, the Grand Prix de l'Imaginaire added a category for best Foreign-Language Novel (translated into French) to continue this category of award.

== Winners ==
Past winners of the Prix Tour-Apollo
| Year | Title | Author | Publisher |
|---|---|---|---|
| 1972 | L'Île des morts (Isle of the Dead) | Roger Zelazny | OPTA |
| 1973 | Tous à Zanzibar (Stand on Zanzibar) | John Brunner | Robert Laffont |
| 1974 | Rêve de fer (The Iron Dream) | Norman Spinrad | OPTA |
| 1975 | L'Enchâssement (The Embedding) | Ian Watson | Calmann-Lévy |
| 1976 | Les Ailes de la nuit (Nightwings) | Robert Silverberg | J'ai lu |
| 1977 | Cette chère humanité (Brave Old World) | Philippe Curval | Robert Laffont |
| 1978 | La Ruche d'Hellstrom (Hellstrom's Hive) | Frank Herbert | Albin Michel |
| 1979 | La Grande Porte (Gateway) | Frederik Pohl | Calmann-Lévy |
| 1980 | Persistance de la vision (The Persistence of Vision) | Short story collection by John Varley | Denoël |
| 1981 | Le Temps des genevriers (Juniper Time) | Kate Wilhelm | Denoël |
| 1982 | L'Idiot-roi (Symbiote's Crown) | Scott Baker | J'ai lu |
| 1983 | L'Orbe et la roue | Michel Jeury | Robert Laffont |
| 1984 | Les Semeurs d'abîmes | Serge Brussolo | Fleuve noir |
| 1985 | La Citadelle de l'Autarque (The Citadel of the Autarch) | Gene Wolfe | Denoël |
| 1986 | La Musique du sang (Blood Music) | Greg Bear | la Découverte |
| 1987 | Les Voies d'Anubis (The Anubis Gates) | Tim Powers | J'ai lu |
| 1988 | La Compagnie des glaces (The Ice Company) | Georges-Jean Arnaud | Fleuve noir |
| 1989 | Le Pays du fou rire (The Land of Laughs) | Jonathan Carroll | J'ai Lu |
| 1990 | Argentine | Joël Houssin | Denoël |

The 1988 award was for the entire series of 36 books that began with La Compagnie des glaces in 1980; the series carries the same name. The full series includes 98 books, the first 36 of which were published in the Anticipation series by Fleuve Noir in 1980-87. (Books 37-62 were published by Fleuve Noir in their own series starting in 1988.) The first book in this series is available in English and French, but (according to WorldCat) the later books in the series are available only in French.

Aside from the later books in the La Compagnie des glaces series, all but three of these winning books are available in English as well as French, and most are available in other languages as well (see the ISFDB external link for details). As of 2013-12-28, Argentine is available only in French, Les semeurs d'abimes only in French and Italian, and L'Orbe et la roue only in French and Spanish.
