= Thorns (novel) =

Novel by Robert Silverberg

- First edition
- Author: Robert Silverberg
- Cover artist: Robert Foster
- Language: English
- Genre: Science fiction
- Publisher: Ballantine
- Publication date: August 1967
- Publication place: United States
- Media type: Print (Hardcover and Paperback)
- Pages: 222
- OCLC: 2190667

Thorns is a science fiction novel by American author Robert Silverberg, published as a paperback original in 1967, and a Nebula and Hugo Awards nominee.

== Synopsis ==
Humanity has colonized the Solar System and moved outward to begin exploring the far reaches of the galaxy. An interplanetary audience follows real-life stories of triumph and tragedy presented to them by Duncan Chalk, a media mogul with apparently limitless resources. Chalk, unknown to all around him, is a kind of psychic vampire who draws sustenance from the emotions of others, particularly those of pain and trauma. Though he enjoys playing his inner circle of assistants against each other as a sort of daily snack, Chalk's true nourishment comes from the dramas he orchestrates for his audience.

Chalk's latest drama involves the pairing of Minner Burris, a space explorer who was captured and surgically altered by aliens on the planet Manipool, and Lona Kelvin, a 17-year-old girl who donated eggs for a fertility experiment that produced a hundred babies. Burris, whose freakish appearance draws attention whenever he ventures out in public, has withdrawn into seclusion and bitterness. Kelvin, whose brief fame as the virgin mother of an army of children has begun to fade, has twice attempted suicide because she has not been allowed to adopt or even see any of her offspring. Chalk promises Burris a full round of surgery and treatment to restore his human appearance, and offers Kelvin a chance to adopt one of her babies, if the two agree to come together for an all-expenses paid tour of the solar system.

At first the two wounded subjects enjoy each other's company and even become lovers. Kelvin's empathy and compassion are stirred by Burris's plight, and Burris enjoys playing masculine protector and guide to the naive teenager. The affection soon curdles into irritation, hostility and even hatred—all of which provide a psychic feast for Chalk. The two finally break off after a particularly vicious fight, which Chalk uses as a pretext to void the agreement. He does, however, try to keep them on the hook by dangling new offers: for example, he asks Kelvin to befriend David Melangio, a childlike man whose feats of memory and calculation are his only means of meeting a world that has already subjected him to overwhelming traumas. Kelvin erupts in rage and is carried off by Chalk's assistants.

Burris, meanwhile, has a sexual fling with Elise, the widow of an astronaut who accompanied Burris on the Manipool landing, and who died from the surgical alterations performed by the aliens. Elise is both aroused and repulsed by Burris' body, and the sadomasochistic nature of her attraction eventually alienates Burris. His withdrawal causes her to commit suicide in a particularly grisly fashion. Burris, deeply shaken, returns to Earth. He has realized that Chalk's promise was empty, and that such help may no longer even be possible—the changes wrought by the Manipool aliens appear irreversible. What's more, the surgery that turned him into a monster has also "improved" his body in unexpected ways that Burris has come to appreciate.

With the inadvertent help of Melangio, who during a typically bland chat lets slip some information that gives them clues into Chalk's true nature, Kelvin and Burris confront the media baron in his office. They expose the full, unfiltered core of their mutual pain to Chalk, who is overwhelmed and finally killed by the intensity of the emotional flood. As the novel ends, Burris has convinced Kelvin to join him in a trip back to Manipool, where they will confront the aliens and, presumably, undergo alterations that take them beyond humanity.

== Themes ==
The line "Pain is instructive" opens and closes the story. It is first delivered by Chalk, and provides ominous foreshadowing; it is later uttered by Burris, who has accepted his condition and come to see the pain it causes as a means toward growth.

This theme is illustrated throughout the story in various ways. David Melangio, whose inner defenses have completely isolated him from memories of his terribly unhappy childhood, cannot face his pain and therefore will never become a fully realized adult. Burris appreciates cacti and thorny succulents, and when Kelvin complains about thorns on a cactus, Burris praises the thorn as an elegant evolutionary adaptation to a hostile environment.

The science behind Lona's fertility experiment was quite novel for the late 60s, but has since become commonplace, and is one of the few dated elements in the novel. By contrast, the idea of mass media serving as theater, and being used as a tool to manipulate and exploit vulnerable people, has only become more timely with the rise of reality shows and the like on television.

"The title describes the book: prickly, rough in texture, a sharp book," Silverberg writes in his memoir Other Spaces, Other Times. "I worked quickly, often managing twenty pages or more, yet making no concessions to conventions of standard science fiction." (p 116) His ambitions for the book were vindicated when Thorns was published in August 1967:

"All of Ballantine's science fiction titles were then automatically being distributed free to members of the two-year-old Science Fiction Writers of America, and so all my colleagues had copies in hand at the time of that year's sf convention. Many of them had read it, and -- as I hoped -- it shook their image of my work. At least a dozen of my friends told me, with the frankness of true friendship, that the book had amazed them: not that they thought me incapable of writing it, but rather that I would be willing to take the trouble. It seemed such a radical break from my formularized science fiction of the 1950s that they thought of it as the work of some entirely new Robert Silverberg." (p 117)

Algis Budrys wrote of his surprise that "Silverberg is now writing deeply detailed, highly educated, beautifully figured books like Thorns" despite still producing 10,000 words a day. Brian Stableford, writing in The Encyclopedia of Science Fiction, called Thorns "a stylized novel of alienation and psychic vampirism," saying that together with Hawksbill Station it marked "a new phase of RS' career, in which he brought the full range of his artistic abilities to bear on writing sf." After an initial burst of competent but callow science fiction work, and a brief layover in which he researched and wrote demanding nonfiction books, Silverberg returned to the genre with a remarkable series of novels written to higher standards of characterization, themes and literary quality.

Thorns has several thematic parallels with Silverberg's contemporaneous novel The Man in the Maze. In both novels, the hero has been unwillingly altered by aliens (physically in Thorns, psychically in The Man in the Maze) and become an embittered outcast; the protagonists expose the full core of their inner torment in order to achieve victory over a seemingly invincible opponent; both stories conclude with the protagonists choosing to embrace an untenable, even inhuman way of life.

== Allusions ==
While working on Thorns, Silverberg came across an Italian science fiction magazine that criticized one of his early novels as badly done and wordy -- malcondotto e prolisse in the original Italian. Silverberg promptly named Minner Burris' fellow astronauts Malcondotto and Prolisse. (Other Spaces, Other Times, p 116)

Oliver Sacks name-checks Thorns in "The Twins", an essay included in his 1985 collection The Man Who Mistook His Wife for a Hat. The twins of the title are a pair of autistic savants who enjoyed brief fame on television for performing feats of memory and calculation, though they themselves were incapable of living without close institutional care. Sacks compares their speech and behavior with that of David Melangio and speculates that Silverberg was familiar with them when he wrote Thorns. Silverberg makes no mention of them in his memoir.

Thorns has some interesting thematic parallels with The Man in the Maze, published two years later. Both novels center on an embittered man altered by contact with an alien race, and who is coaxed out of hiding by a morally ambiguous character with a hidden agenda. The threat in each novel is nullified when the protagonist exposes the unfiltered core of his being to a telepathic receptor.

Many of Silverberg's best-known stories explore the darker aspects of telepathy and psychic powers. In Thorns, Duncan Chalk's telepathic abilities have turned him into an emotional vampire leeching off the pain of others. In the novels Dying Inside and The Second Trip, telepathy blights lives and turns characters into self-hating voyeurs. Silverberg's celebrated short story "Flies" centers on a spacefarer who commits terrible acts against former loved ones so that their anguish may be studied by distant aliens. In another famous story, "Passengers," disembodied aliens enter the minds of unwilling human hosts and distort their behavior, bringing civilization to the brink of collapse.

== Sources ==
- Clute, John with Peter Nicholls. The Encyclopedia of Science Fiction. New York: St Martin's Griffin, 1993 (2nd edition 1995). ISBN 0-312-13486-X.
- Sacks, Oliver. The Man Who Mistook His Wife for a Hat, and Other Clinical Tales. Summit Books, 1985. ISBN 0-671-55471-9.
- Silverberg, Robert. Other Spaces, Other Times: A Life Spent in the Future. Nonstop Press, 2009. ISBN 978-1-933065-12-0.
