= Son of Man (novel) =

1971 science fiction novel by Robert Silverberg

First edition, published by Ballantine Books. Cover art by Gene Szafran.

Son of Man is a science fiction novel by American writer Robert Silverberg, published in 1971. The book is about Clay, a 20th-century man, who travels billions of years into the future and meets humanity in its future forms. Some of the issues discussed in the book are sexuality, telepathic communication between people, physical prowess or frailty, division of humans by caste or ability, and the preservation of ancient wisdom, among other things.

== Reception ==
Norman Spinrad has described it as "brilliant". Matt Hughes considers it "an artifact of its period, a remarkable, heady, head-trippy plunge into a new way of writing sf, and into a new way of thinking", but notes that because Silverberg is addressing "the timeless questions -- what are we? where do we come from? where are we going?", the book has not become "stale and musty".
