= The Conglomeroid Cocktail Party =

1984 collection by Robert Silverberg

First edition (publ. Arbor House) Cover art by Loretta Trezzo

The Conglomeroid Cocktail Party is a collection by Robert Silverberg published in 1984.

== Plot summary ==
The Conglomeroid Cocktail Party is a collection of 16 newly written science-fiction stories.

== Reception ==
Dave Langford reviewed The Conglomeroid Cocktail Party for White Dwarf #63, and stated that "These sixteen were written in the 80s, and are very polished indeed: suave, cosmopolitan, exotic. Sometimes, too, a bit routine in their use of well-worn SF elements; Silverberg's effects rely not on new twists but on atmosphere and irony. It's a good collection...though his 1967-76 novels remain his best work."

== Reviews ==
- Review by Dan Chow (1984) in Locus, #279 April 1984
- Review by Lawrence I. Charters (1984) in Fantasy Review, August 1984
- Review by Geoff Ryman (1986) in Foundation, #37 Autumn 1986
