= Alpha 7 (Robert Silverberg anthology) =

1977 anthology edited by Robert Silverberg

- Editor: Robert Silverberg
- Cover artist: Randy Weidner
- Language: English
- Genre: Science fiction
- Publisher: Berkley Publishing Corporation
- Publication date: July 1977
- Publication place: United States
- Media type: Print (Paperback)
- Pages: 240
- ISBN: 0425035301
- OCLC: 33020645
- Preceded by: Alpha 6
- Followed by: Alpha 8

Alpha 7 is a science fiction anthology edited by Robert Silverberg first published in 1977.

== Contents ==
- Introduction by Robert Silverberg
- "Dune Roller" by Julian May
- "Shape" by Robert Sheckley
- "Transfer Point" by Anthony Boucher
- "A Galaxy Called Rome" by Barry N. Malzberg
- "Rejoice, Rejoice, We Have No Choice" by Terry Carr
- "Orphans of the Void" by Michael Shaara
- "The Luckiest Man in Denv" by C. M. Kornbluth
- "For Love" by Algis Budrys
- "World War II" by George Alec Effinger
- "The Night of Hoggy Darn" by Robert McKenna
