= Alpha 5 (Robert Silverberg anthology) =

1974 anthology edited by Robert Silverberg

- Editor: Robert Silverberg
- Cover artist: Bruce Pennington
- Language: English
- Genre: Science fiction
- Publisher: Ballantine Books
- Publication date: August 1974
- Publication place: United States
- Media type: Print (paperback)
- Pages: 267
- ISBN: 0345241401
- OCLC: 934752
- Preceded by: Alpha 4
- Followed by: Alpha 6

Alpha 5 is a science fiction anthology edited by American writer Robert Silverberg, first published in 1974.

== Contents ==
- Introduction by Robert Silverberg
- "The Star Pit" by Samuel R. Delany
- "Baby, You Were Great" by Kate Wilhelm
- "Live, From Berchtesgaden" by George Alec Effinger
- "As Never Was" by P. Schuyler Miller
- "We Can Remember It For You Wholesale" by Philip K. Dick
- "Yesterday House" by Fritz Leiber
- "A Man Must Die" by John Clute
- "The Skills of Xanadu" by Theodore Sturgeon
- "A Special Kind of Morning" by Gardner R. Dozois
