= Alpha 2 (anthology) =

1971 anthology edited by Robert Silverberg

- Editor: Robert Silverberg
- Cover artist: Larry Kresek
- Language: English
- Genre: Science fiction
- Publisher: Ballantine Books
- Publication date: November 1971
- Publication place: United States
- Media type: Print (Paperback)
- Pages: 310
- ISBN: 0345024192
- OCLC: 428159
- Preceded by: Alpha 1
- Followed by: Alpha 3

Alpha 2 is a science fiction anthology edited by Robert Silverberg, first published as a paperback original by Ballantine Books in November 1971. It was republished in 2022.

== Contents ==
- Introduction by Robert Silverberg
- "Call Me Joe" by Poul Anderson (Astounding 1957)
- "Goodbye Amanda Jean" by Wilma Shore (Galaxy 1970)
- "A Man of the Renaissance" by Wyman Guin (Galaxy 1964)
- "Wall of Crystal, Eye of Night" by Algis Budrys (Galaxy 1961)
- "Faith of Our Fathers" by Philip K. Dick (Dangerous Visions 1967)
- "That Share of Glory" by C. M. Kornbluth (Astounding 1952)
- "The Men Return" by Jack Vance (Infinity 1957)
- "The Voices of Time" by J. G. Ballard (New Worlds 1960)
- "The Burning of the Brain" by Cordwainer Smith (If 1958)
- "The Shaker Revival" by Gerald Jonas (Galaxy 1970)

"Faith of Our Fathers" was nominated for the 1968 Hugo Award for Best Novelette.

== Reception ==
Writing in The New York Times Book Review, Theodore Sturgeon praised the anthology, saying that "Robert Silverberg, who knows good story-telling and good writing because that's what he does, uses these criteria in his selections for his Alpha series". Sturgeon also praised Alpha 2 in Galaxy, describing it as "ten fine stories and a Best Buy". Amazing Stories lauded Alpha 2 as "as strong an entry as its predecessor. . . . [T]he level of writing is high, the visions uncommonly clear, and the book, ultimately, entertaining".

== Awards ==
It placed sixth in the reprint anthology/collection category in the 1972 Locus Poll.
