= Up the Line =

1969 novel by Robert Silverberg

- First edition (p/b)
- Author: Robert Silverberg
- Cover artist: Ron Walotsky
- Language: English
- Genre: Science fiction
- Publisher: Ballantine Books
- Publication date: 1969
- Publication place: United States
- Media type: Print (Paperback)

Up the Line (1969) is a time travel novel by American science fiction author Robert Silverberg. The plot revolves mainly around the paradoxes brought about by time travel and is considered an example of the more sexually-permissive era of late 1960s American science-fiction, a reflection of the counterculture of its day. It was nominated for a Nebula Award for Best Novel in 1969 and a Hugo Award for Best Novel in 1970 but lost to Ursula K. Le Guin's The Left Hand of Darkness both times.

It was originally serialized in Amazing Stories in 1969 and then issued as a paperback original by Ballantine Books later that year.

== Plot summary ==
Jud Elliott II is a failed Harvard history masters student in 2059. Bored with his job as a law clerk, he takes up a position with the Time Service as a Time Courier. After an introductory course, Jud shunts up and down the time line ("up the line" is travel into the past; "down the line" is forward time travel, but only to "now-time," Jud's present of 2059) as a guide for tourists visiting ancient and medieval Byzantium/Constantinople.

Jud's problems include not only stupid tourists, but also greedy and mentally unstable colleagues who attempt to cause various types of havoc with the past. He is forced to break the rules in order to patch things up without drawing the attention of the Time Patrol.

When he meets and falls in love with the 'marvelous transtemporal paradox called Pulcheria' - his own multi-great-grandmother - Jud succumbs to the lure of the past, creates irreparable paradoxes, and faces the inescapable clutches of the Time Patrol.

Silverberg's narrative includes some cleverly worked out details about the problems of time-travel tourism. For example, the number of tourists who over the years wish to witness the Crucifixion of Jesus has increased the audience at the event from the likely dozens to hundreds and even tens of thousands. Time-tour guides re-visiting the same event must also take care not to scan their surroundings too closely, lest they make eye contact with themselves leading another tour party.

Silverberg's interest in the Byzantine era of Roman history is put to use with a vivid description of Constantinople during the reign of Justinian, and the Nika riots of 532.

== Reception ==
Algis Budrys reviewed Up the Line unfavorably, saying that if it were not for "the amount and kind of sex introduced" and the "long, descriptive passages on Constantinople," it "would be a short story or novelette." His review also discussed, at some length, various illogical elements in the novel's plotting.

Up the Line was nominated for a Nebula Award for Best Novel in 1969 and a Hugo Award for Best Novel in 1970.

== Spinoffs ==
In the 1990s, a series of six books were written, set in the same fictional world as Up the Line, called Robert Silverberg's Time Tours:

- The Robin Hood Ambush by William F. Wu
- Glory's End by Nick Baron
- Timecrime, Inc. by Debra Doyle and James D. Macdonald
- The Dinosaur Trackers by Thomas Shadwell
- The Pirate Paradox by Greg Cox and Nick Baron
- Caesar's Time Legions by Jeremy Kingston
