= Alpha 4 =

1973 anthology edited by Robert Silverberg

- Editor: Robert Silverberg
- Cover artist: Bruce Pennington
- Language: English
- Genre: Science fiction
- Publisher: Ballantine Books
- Publication date: October 1973
- Publication place: United States
- Media type: Print (paperback)
- Pages: 279
- ISBN: 0345235649
- OCLC: 864670
- Preceded by: Alpha 3
- Followed by: Alpha 5

Alpha 4 is a science fiction anthology edited by American writer Robert Silverberg, first published in 1973.

== Contents ==
- Introduction by Robert Silverberg
- "Casablanca" by Thomas M. Disch
- "Dio"' by Damon Knight
- "Eastward Ho!" by William Tenn
- "Judas Danced" by Brian W. Aldiss
- "Angel's Egg" by Edgar Pangborn
- "In His Image" by Terry Carr
- "All Pieces of a River Shore" by R.A. Lafferty
- "We All Die Naked" by James Blish
- "Carcinoma Angels" by Norman Spinrad
- "Mother" by Philip José Farmer
- "5,271,009" by Alfred Bester
