= Nightwings (novella) =

1968 science fiction novella by Robert Silverberg

- Short story by Robert Silverberg
- First book edition (Avon Books)
- Genre: Science fiction

Publication
- Publisher: Galaxy Magazine
- Publication date: September 1968

"Nightwings" is a science fiction novella by American writer Robert Silverberg. It was first published in Galaxy Science Fiction magazine in September 1968.

The novella won the Hugo Award for Best Novella in 1969 and was also nominated for the Nebula Award for Best Novella in 1968. It won the Prix Apollo Award in 1976. "Nightwings" is the first in a trilogy of novellas, the next two being "Perris Way" (1968) and "To Jorslem" (1969). These three works were later collected into a single fixup in three sections, also titled Nightwings. According to Silverberg's introductions, the changes required to turn the three shorter works into a novel were relatively minor.

== Plot summary ==
In a decadent and caste-based future, humanity is divided into guilds, each having a specific job to do. The members of some guilds appear to have undergone genetic engineering, for instance, the Fliers' ability to fly and the Watchers' ability to watch distant stars.

The main character in the novella is a Watcher whose mission is to watch the skies with some sophisticated equipment and to inform the Defenders in the event of an alien invasion. Along with a young Flier girl and a Changeling (who belongs to no guild), he visits the old city of Roum (suspected previously to be called Rome), and becomes entangled in events including the possibility of invasion.

Apart from Roum, a number of other great cities are mentioned including Jorslem (Jerusalem), Stambool (Istanbul), Marsay (Marseille), Donsk (Gdańsk), Nayrub (Nairobi), Dijon, Palerm (Palermo) and Perris (Paris), but their greatness is relative, as they only have a few thousand inhabitants.

== Adaptations ==
- In 1985 "Nightwings" was adapted as a graphic novel, the second in the DC Science Fiction Graphic Novel line, by Cary Bates and Gene Colan.
- An abridged audiobook edition was released on compact cassette by Durkin Hayes Audio in 1987, ISBN 0886462134, ISBN 9780886462130.
