= Alpha 9 (Robert Silverberg anthology) =

1978 anthology edited by Robert Silverberg

- Editor: Robert Silverberg
- Cover artist: Vicente Segrelles
- Language: English
- Genre: Science fiction
- Publisher: Berkley Publishing Corporation
- Publication date: October 1978
- Publication place: United States
- Media type: Print (paperback)
- Pages: 180
- ISBN: 0425038386
- OCLC: 4531774
- Preceded by: Alpha 8

Alpha 9 is a science fiction anthology edited by American writer Robert Silverberg, first published in 1978.

== Contents ==
- Introduction by Robert Silverberg
- "Dumb Waiter" by Walter M. Miller, Jr.
- "The Monsters" by Robert Sheckley
- "The Sliced-Crosswise Only-On-Tuesday World" by Philip José Farmer
- "The Funeral" by Kate Wilhelm
- "The Book" by Michael Shaara
- "Dusty Zebra" by Clifford D. Simak
- "Goodlife" by Fred Saberhagen
- "Nobody's Home" by Joanna Russ
