= Gerald Jonas =

American writer, journalist, and literary critic

Gerald Jonas is an American writer, journalist, and literary critic. He was a staff writer for The New Yorker for approximately 30 years and a science fiction book critic for The New York Times Book Review. He wrote a number of nonfiction books, and his science fiction novelette The Shaker Revival was nominated for a Nebula Award in 1970. He was awarded a Guggenheim Fellowship in 1975 and a Rockefeller Fellowship in 1977.

== Early life and education ==
Jonas was born in 1935. He attended the Horace Mann School in New York and Yale University where he was on the editorial board of the Yale Daily News. He subsequently held a Henry Fellowship at the University of Cambridge.

== Career ==
Jonas spent approximately three decades as a staff writer for The New Yorker. He served as a science fiction book critic for The New York Times Book Review for approximately 30 years, reviewing more than 900 works of science fiction and related literature.

His later journalism included obituaries of science fiction writers Arthur C. Clarke, Ray Bradbury, and Ursula K. Le Guin for The New York Times.

=== Nonfiction books ===
Jonas has written six nonfiction books on a variety of subjects.

His first book, On Doing Good: The Quaker Experiment (1971), examined the history and principles of the Religious Society of Friends. Reviewing the book, Kirkus Reviews described it as "refreshingly objective".

His second book, Visceral Learning: Toward a Science of Self-Control (1973), discussed research into how bodily functions such as blood pressure can change through "visceral learning".

Jonas's Stuttering: The Disorder of Many Theories (1977) examined research into stuttering disorder, which Jonas suffered from during his childhood. A review in Kirkus Reviews called it an "affecting, informed, deliberative essay".

His 1989 book, The Circuit Riders: Rockefeller Money and the Rise of Modern Science, described how the Rockefeller Foundation used philanthropy in scientific research. It was criticized in JAMA and The New York Times Book Review for its lack of organization.

His 1992 book, Dancing: The Pleasure, Power, and Art of Movement, is an overview of dance history and criticism published alongside an 8-part video series.

His sixth nonfiction book, The Living Earth Book of North American Trees (1993), discusses how North American trees were used by humans throughout North American history up to the present day.

=== Fiction and poetry ===
In addition to his nonfiction and journalism, Jonas has published short fiction and poetry. His work has appeared in The New Yorker, The Atlantic, Poetry, The Nation, The New Republic and The Paris Review.

His science fiction novelette The Shaker Revival, published in Galaxy Science Fiction in 1970, was nominated for the Nebula Award for Best Novelette for that year.

Jonas is a coauthor with writer Renata Adler, writing under the pseudonym Jean Marple, on the short story "The Stand-in", which appeared in the summer 1969 issue of The Paris Review.

== Selected bibliography ==
=== Nonfiction books ===
- Jonas, Gerald (1971). On Doing Good: The Quaker Experiment. Scribners. ISBN 9780684132174.
- Jonas, Gerald (1973). Visceral learning; toward a science of self-control. New York: Viking Press. ISBN 9780670747030.
- Jonas, Gerald (1977). Stuttering, the disorder of many theories. New York: Farrar, Straus & Giroux. ISBN 9780374271183.
- Jonas, Gerald (1989). The circuit riders: Rockefeller money and the rise of modern science. New York: Norton. ISBN 039302640X.
- Jonas, Gerald (1992). Dancing: the pleasure, power, and art of movement. New York: Harry N. Abrams in association with Thirteen/WNET. ISBN 9780810932128.
- Jonas, Gerald (1993). The living earth book of North American trees. Pleasantville, N.Y: Reader's Digest Association. ISBN 9780895774880.

=== Other works ===
- Jonas, Gerald (1970). The Shaker Revival. Galaxy Science Fiction.
- Jonas, Gerald (17 September 1977). The Art of Reviewing Science Books. The Sciences.
