= Tower of Glass =

1970 novel by Robert Silverberg

- First edition
- Author: Robert Silverberg
- Language: English
- Genre: Science fiction
- Publisher: Charles Scribner's Sons
- Publication date: 1970
- Publication place: United States
- Media type: Print (hardback & paperback)
- Pages: 247
- ISBN: 0-684-10544-6

Tower of Glass is a science fiction novel by American writer Robert Silverberg, published in 1970. It was nominated for the Nebula Award in 1970, and for both the Hugo and Locus Awards in 1971.

== Plot summary ==
The plot involves 24th-century entrepreneur-tycoon-scientist Simeon Krug, who has created a race of androids to serve humanity. Krug directs the construction of an immense tower of glass in the Canadian tundra. The edifice is not a monument, however, but a way to communicate with a distant planetary nebula, NGC 7293, from which an intelligent (though indecipherable) message has been received. Krug is also building a starship to send there, which is to be crewed by androids in hibernation.

The tower construction is directed by Krug's most faithful android, Alpha Thor Watchman. Thor and other leading androids have invented a secret religion for androids, based on the vision that their creator, Krug, intends to eventually make them equal to humans. Krug is unaware of the religion. Thor's dream is to convince him through indirect means, including the manipulation of his weak-willed son and heir, Manuel, through a sexual relationship with a female android, Alpha Lilith Meson. Thor eventually falls in love with her, as does Manuel.

After Thor and Lilith have manipulated Manuel into telling his father about the android religion, Krug insists that the minds of him and Thor be connected in the "shunt room" which allows one mind to probe another's (a form of technologically enabled telepathy). Thor discovers via the link that Krug regards androids as mere things, and has no intention of treating them as equal to womb-born humans. Realizing that Krug will never give freedom to androids, Thor loses his faith and announces Krug's true nature to androids worldwide. With the collapse of their religion, androids across all of Earth rebel. Many walk off their jobs, others take control of key Earth installations, and some even kill humans in their long-suppressed rage. Thor then causes the fall of the nearly-complete, 1,200-metre-tall (3,900 ft) tower.

An enraged Krug attacks Thor; the latter, unable to fight his creator, is pushed into an unprogrammed teleporter and annihilated. Krug, his empire destroyed and humanity in grave danger, flees in his starship, alone, towards the star system from which the alien message was sent.
