= Alpha 6 (Robert Silverberg anthology) =

1976 anthology edited by Robert Silverberg

- Editor: Robert Silverberg
- Cover artist: Richard Powers
- Language: English
- Genre: Science fiction
- Publisher: Berkley Publishing Corporation
- Publication date: April 1976
- Publication place: United States
- Media type: Print (paperback)
- Pages: 211
- ISBN: 0425030482
- OCLC: 34350522
- Preceded by: Alpha 5
- Followed by: Alpha 7

Alpha 6 is a science fiction anthology edited by American writer Robert Silverberg, first published in 1976 with an original cover by Richard M. Powers.

== Contents ==
- Introduction by Robert Silverberg
- "The Lost Continent" by Norman Spinrad
- "Light of Other Days" by Bob Shaw
- "The Secret of Old Custard" by John Sladek
- "Down among the Dead Men" by William Tenn
- "With These Hands" by C.M. Kornbluth
- "Short in the Chest" by Idris Seabright
- "Brown Robert" by Terry Carr
- "The Food Farm" by Kit Reed
- "An Honorable Death" by Gordon R. Dickson
- "Man of Parts" by Horace L. Gold
- "Painwise" by James Tiptree
