= Alpha 1 (Robert Silverberg anthology) =

1970 anthology edited by Robert Silverberg

- Editor: Robert Silverberg
- Cover artist: John Lindner
- Language: English
- Genre: Science fiction short stories
- Publisher: Ballantine Books
- Publication date: September 1970
- Publication place: United States
- Media type: Print (paperback)
- Pages: 278
- ISBN: 0345220145
- OCLC: 2413461
- Followed by: Alpha 2

Alpha 1 is a science fiction anthology edited by Robert Silverberg first published in 1970.

== Stories in Alpha 1 ==
- Introduction by Robert Silverberg
- Poor Little Warrior by Brian W. Aldiss
- The Moon Moth by Jack Vance
- Testament of Andros by James Blish
- A Triptych by Barry N. Malzberg
- For a Breath I Tarry by Roger Zelazny
- Game for Motel Room by Fritz Leiber
- Thus We Frustrate Charlemagne by R. A. Lafferty
- The Man Who Came Early by Poul Anderson
- The Time of His Life by Larry Eisenberg
- The Doctor by Ted Thomas
- Time Trap by Charles L. Harness
- The Pi Man by Alfred Bester
- The Last Man Left in the Bar by C. M. Kornbluth
- The Terminal Beach by J. G. Ballard
