= Alpha 3 (anthology) =

1972 anthology edited by Robert Silverberg

- Cover of first edition
- Editor: Robert Silverberg
- Language: English
- Series: Alpha
- Genre: Science fiction
- Publisher: Ballantine Books
- Publication date: October 1972
- Publication place: United States
- Media type: Print (paperback)
- Pages: 277
- ISBN: 0-345-02883-X
- OCLC: 10805324
- Preceded by: Alpha 2
- Followed by: Alpha 4

Alpha 3 is an anthology of science fiction short works edited by Robert Silverberg. It was first published in paperback by Ballantine Books in October 1972.

The book collects ten novellas, novelettes and short stories by various science fiction authors, together with an introduction by the editor.

== Contents ==
- "Introduction" (Robert Silverberg)
- "The Gift of Gab" (Jack Vance)
- "Beyond Lies the Wub" (Philip K. Dick)
- "Nine Hundred Grandmothers" (R. A. Lafferty)
- "Total Environment" (Brian W. Aldiss)
- "Day Million" (Frederik Pohl)
- "Aristotle and the Gun" (L. Sprague de Camp)
- "Under Old Earth" (Cordwainer Smith)
- "The Shadow of Space" (Philip José Farmer)
- "Come to Venus Melancholy" (Thomas M. Disch)
- "Rescue Party" (Arthur C. Clarke)
