= SF Masterworks =

Series of science fiction novel reprints

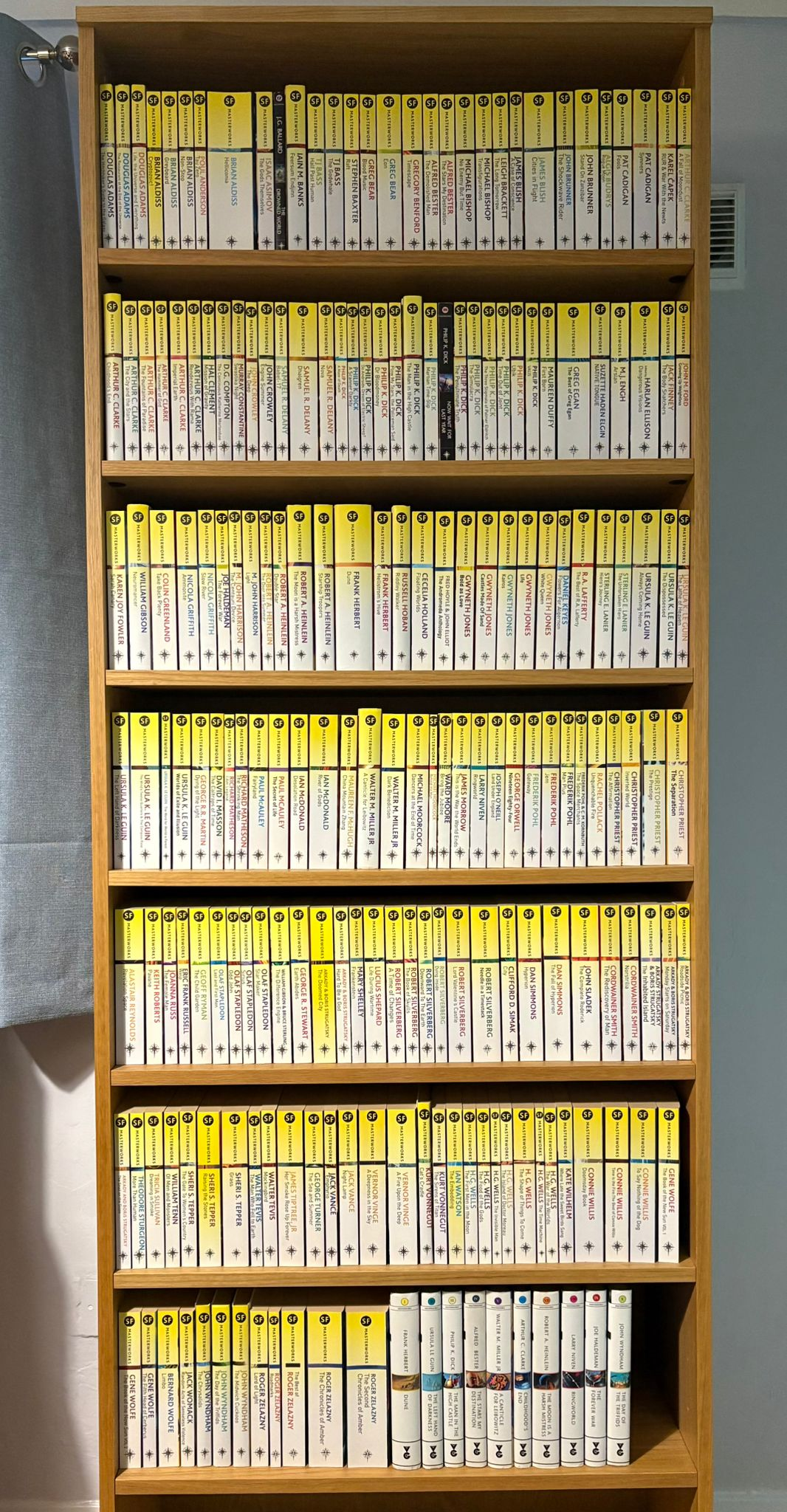
- A bookshelf containing every published SF Masterworks title, as of August 2025
- Country: United Kingdom
- Language: English
- Genre: Science fiction
- Publisher: Millennium; Gollancz; Gateway
- Published: 1999–present
- Media type: Print
- No. of books: 280
- Website: store.gollancz.co.uk

S.F. Masterworks is a series of science fiction novel reprints published by UK-based company Orion Publishing Group, a subsidiary of Hachette UK. The series is intended for the UK and Australian markets, but many editions are distributed to the United States and Canada by Hachette Book Group. As of December 2025, 199 unique titles and approximately 308 volumes, including hardcover, revised, or reprinted editions, have been published.

Superseding the earlier series Gollancz Classic SF (1986–1987) and VGSF Classics (1988–1990), the SF Masterworks series began publication in 1999. Developed to feature important and out of print science fiction novels, the selections were described by science fiction author Iain M. Banks as "amazing" and "genuinely the best novels from sixty years of SF". Many of the selections had been out of print in the United Kingdom for several years.

Its companion series include Fantasy Masterworks and Gateway Essentials.

== Numbered series ==
=== Softcover editions (1999–2007) ===
Not all printings include a number stamp. Some printings do not include markings or cover designs to indicate they are volumes of any series.

In 2010, several volumes were reprinted with cover designs and colored spines matching the relaunch series. The ISBNs for those volumes were not changed.

- † Hardcover editions only.
- ^ No relaunch edition with distinct ISBN as of October 2025.

No.	Title	Author(s)	Reprint date	ISBN
1	The Forever War	Joe Haldeman	21 January 1999	1-85798-808-6
2	I Am Legend	Richard Matheson	21 January 1999	1-85798-809-4
3	Cities in Flight	James Blish	11 February 1999	1-85798-811-6
4	Do Androids Dream of Electric Sheep?	Philip K. Dick	11 February 1999	1-85798-813-2
5	The Stars My Destination	Alfred Bester	11 March 1999	1-85798-814-0
6	Babel-17	Samuel R. Delany	11 March 1999	1-85798-805-1
7	Lord of Light	Roger Zelazny	8 April 1999	1-85798-820-5
8	The Fifth Head of Cerberus	Gene Wolfe	8 April 1999	1-85798-817-5
9	Gateway	Frederik Pohl	13 May 1999	1-85798-818-3
10	The Rediscovery of Man	Cordwainer Smith	13 May 1999	1-85798-819-1
11	Last and First Men	Olaf Stapledon	10 June 1999	1-85798-806-X
12	Earth Abides	George R. Stewart	10 June 1999	1-85798-821-3
13	Martian Time-Slip	Philip K. Dick	8 July 1999	1-85798-837-X
14	The Demolished Man ^	Alfred Bester	8 July 1999	1-85798-822-1
15	Stand on Zanzibar	John Brunner	12 August 1999	1-85798-836-1
16	The Dispossessed	Ursula K. Le Guin	12 August 1999	1-85798-882-5
17	The Drowned World ^	J. G. Ballard	9 September 1999	1-85798-883-3
18	The Sirens of Titan ^	Kurt Vonnegut	9 September 1999	1-85798-884-1
19	Emphyrio	Jack Vance	14 October 1999	1-85798-885-X
20	A Scanner Darkly	Philip K. Dick	14 October 1999	1-85798-847-7
21	Star Maker	Olaf Stapledon	11 November 1999	1-85798-807-8
22	Behold the Man ^	Michael Moorcock	11 November 1999	1-85798-848-5
23	The Book of Skulls	Robert Silverberg	16 December 1999	1-85798-914-7
24	The Time Machine and The War of the Worlds	H. G. Wells	16 December 1999	1-85798-887-6
25	Flowers for Algernon	Daniel Keyes	13 January 2000	1-85798-938-4
26	Ubik	Philip K. Dick	10 February 2000	1-85798-853-1
27	Timescape	Gregory Benford	9 March 2000	1-85798-935-X
28	More Than Human	Theodore Sturgeon	13 April 2000	1-85798-852-3
29	Man Plus ^	Frederik Pohl	11 May 2000	1-85798-946-5
30	A Case of Conscience	James Blish	15 June 2000	1-85798-924-4
31	The Centauri Device	M. John Harrison	13 July 2000	1-85798-997-X
32	Dr. Bloodmoney	Philip K. Dick	10 August 2000	1-85798-952-X
33	Non-Stop	Brian Aldiss	14 November 2000	1-85798-998-8
34	The Fountains of Paradise	Arthur C. Clarke	12 October 2000	1-85798-721-7
35	Pavane	Keith Roberts	9 November 2000	1-85798-937-6
36	Now Wait for Last Year ^	Philip K. Dick	4 December 2000	1-85798-701-2
37	Nova	Samuel R. Delany	11 January 2001	1-85798-742-X
38	The First Men in the Moon	H. G. Wells	8 February 2001	1-85798-746-2
39	The City and the Stars	Arthur C. Clarke	8 March 2001	1-85798-763-2
40	Blood Music	Greg Bear	12 April 2001	1-85798-762-4
41	Jem	Frederik Pohl	10 May 2001	1-85798-789-6
42	Bring the Jubilee	Ward Moore	14 June 2001	1-85798-764-0
43	VALIS	Philip K. Dick	12 July 2001	1-85798-339-4
44	The Lathe of Heaven	Ursula K. Le Guin	9 August 2001	1-85798-951-1
45	The Complete Roderick	John Sladek	12 October 2001	1-85798-340-8
46	Flow My Tears, the Policeman Said	Philip K. Dick	8 November 2001	1-85798-341-6
47	The Invisible Man	H. G. Wells	6 December 2001	1-85798-949-X
48	Grass	Sheri S. Tepper	14 February 2002	1-85798-798-5
49	A Fall of Moondust	Arthur C. Clarke	14 March 2002	0-575-07317-9
50	Eon	Greg Bear	11 April 2002	0-575-07316-0
51	The Shrinking Man	Richard Matheson	9 January 2003	0-575-07463-9
52	The Three Stigmata of Palmer Eldritch	Philip K. Dick	31 July 2008	0-575-07480-9
53	The Dancers at the End of Time ^	Michael Moorcock	8 May 2003	0-575-07476-0
54	The Space Merchants ^	Frederik Pohl and Cyril M. Kornbluth	10 July 2003	0-575-07528-7
55	Time Out of Joint	Philip K. Dick	11 September 2003	0-575-07458-2
56	Downward to the Earth	Robert Silverberg	12 February 2004	0-575-07523-6
57	The Simulacra	Philip K. Dick	9 September 2004	0-575-07460-4
58	The Penultimate Truth	Philip K. Dick	10 February 2005	0-575-07481-7
59	Dying Inside	Robert Silverberg	14 April 2005	0-575-07525-2
60	Ringworld	Larry Niven	9 June 2005	0-575-07702-6
61	The Child Garden	Geoff Ryman	11 August 2005	0-575-07690-9
62	Mission of Gravity	Hal Clement	13 October 2005	0-575-07708-5
63	A Maze of Death	Philip K. Dick	1 December 2005	0-575-07461-2
64	Tau Zero	Poul Anderson	9 February 2006	0-575-07732-8
65	Rendezvous with Rama	Arthur C. Clarke	13 April 2006	0-575-07733-6
66	Life During Wartime	Lucius Shepard	8 June 2006	0-575-07734-4
67	Where Late the Sweet Birds Sang	Kate Wilhelm	12 October 2006	0-575-07914-2
68	Roadside Picnic	Arkady and Boris Strugatsky	8 February 2007	978-0-575-07978-6
69	Dark Benediction	Walter M. Miller Jr.	12 April 2007	978-0-575-07977-9
70	Mockingbird	Walter Tevis	14 June 2007	978-0-575-07915-1
71	Dune †	Frank Herbert	18 October 2007	978-0-575-08150-5
72	The Moon Is a Harsh Mistress †^	Robert A. Heinlein	11 December 2008	978-0-575-08241-0
73	The Man in the High Castle †	Philip K. Dick	17 September 2009	978-0-575-08205-2

=== Hardcover editions (2001) ===
Not all printings include a number stamp. Some printings do not include markings or cover designs to indicate they are volumes of any series.

No.	Title	Author(s)	Reprint date	ISBN
1	Dune	Frank Herbert	25 October 2001	0-575-07334-9
2	The Left Hand of Darkness	Ursula K. Le Guin	18 October 2001	0-575-07219-9
3	The Man in the High Castle	Philip K. Dick	18 October 2001	0-575-07335-7
4	The Stars My Destination	Alfred Bester	18 October 2001	0-575-07337-3
5	A Canticle for Leibowitz	Walter M. Miller Jr.	18 October 2001	0-575-07220-2
6	Childhood's End	Arthur C. Clarke	18 October 2001	0-575-07263-6
7	The Moon Is a Harsh Mistress	Robert A. Heinlein	18 October 2001	0-575-07336-5
8	Ringworld	Larry Niven	18 October 2001	0-575-07339-X
9	The Forever War	Joe Haldeman	18 October 2001	0-575-07318-7
10	The Day of the Triffids	John Wyndham	18 October 2001	0-575-07338-1

== Relaunch series ==
A selection of titles from the series on display at a London bookshop.

=== Softcover editions (2010–present) ===
The relaunched series features yellow–white spines, the S.F. Masterworks marquee printed vertically atop tinted artwork, and newly typeset and corrected text. As with the numbered volumes, many printings, that have identical ISBNs, do not include markings or cover designs to indicate they are volumes of any series.

Title	Author(s)	Reprint date	ISBN
Babel-17	Samuel R. Delany	29 March 2010	978-0-575-09420-8
Cities in Flight	James Blish	29 March 2010	978-0-575-09417-8
Do Androids Dream of Electric Sheep?	Philip K. Dick	29 March 2010	978-0-575-09418-5
The Fifth Head of Cerberus	Gene Wolfe	29 March 2010	978-0-575-09422-2
The Forever War	Joe Haldeman	29 March 2010	978-0-575-09414-7
Gateway	Frederik Pohl	29 March 2010	978-0-575-09423-9
I Am Legend	Richard Matheson	29 March 2010	978-0-575-09416-1
Lord of Light	Roger Zelazny	29 March 2010	978-0-575-09421-5
The Rediscovery of Man	Cordwainer Smith	29 March 2010	978-0-575-09424-6
The Stars My Destination	Alfred Bester	29 March 2010	978-0-575-09419-2
The Three Stigmata of Palmer Eldritch	Philip K. Dick	1 April 2010	978-0-575-07480-4
Ubik	Philip K. Dick	1 April 2010	978-1-85798-853-6
Inverted World	Christopher Priest	13 May 2010	978-0-575-08210-6
Flow My Tears, the Policeman Said	Philip K. Dick	14 May 2010	978-1-85798-341-8
The Simulacra	Philip K. Dick	14 May 2010	978-0-575-07460-6
Time Out of Joint	Philip K. Dick	14 May 2010	978-0-575-07458-3
VALIS	Philip K. Dick	14 May 2010	978-1-85798-339-5
Bring the Jubilee	Ward Moore	14 June 2010	978-1-85798-764-5
Dhalgren	Samuel R. Delany	22 July 2010	978-0-575-09099-6
Helliconia	Brian Aldiss	12 August 2010	978-0-575-08615-9
The Lathe of Heaven	Ursula K. Le Guin	19 August 2010	978-1-85798-951-9
The Body Snatchers	Jack Finney	14 October 2010	978-0-575-08531-2
The Complete Roderick	John Sladek	11 November 2010	978-1-85798-340-1
The Female Man	Joanna Russ	11 November 2010	978-0-575-09499-4
Arslan	M. J. Engh	9 December 2010	978-0-575-09501-4
Tau Zero	Poul Anderson	30 December 2010	978-0-575-07732-4
The Centauri Device	M. John Harrison	30 December 2010	978-1-85798-997-7
The Difference Engine	William Gibson and Bruce Sterling	13 January 2011	978-0-575-09940-1
The Prestige	Christopher Priest	10 February 2011	978-0-575-09941-8
Greybeard	Brian Aldiss	18 March 2011	978-0-575-07113-1
Martian Time-Slip	Philip K. Dick	24 March 2011	978-1-85798-837-6
Sirius	Olaf Stapledon	14 April 2011	978-0-575-09942-5
Hyperion	Dan Simmons	12 May 2011	978-0-575-09943-2
Non-Stop	Brian Aldiss	12 May 2011	978-1-85798-998-4
The City and the Stars	Arthur C. Clarke	2 June 2011	978-1-85798-763-8
City	Clifford D. Simak	9 June 2011	978-0-575-10523-2
Hellstrom's Hive	Frank Herbert	14 July 2011	978-0-575-10108-1
Of Men and Monsters	William Tenn	11 August 2011	978-0-575-09944-9
Dying Inside	Robert Silverberg	29 September 2011	978-0-575-07525-2
Grass	Sheri S. Tepper	29 September 2011	978-1-85798-798-0
Pavane	Keith Roberts	29 September 2011	978-1-85798-937-3
Ringworld	Larry Niven	29 September 2011	978-0-57507-702-7
Timescape	Gregory Benford	29 September 2011	978-1-85798-935-9
The Affirmation	Christopher Priest	13 October 2011	978-0-575-09946-3
R.U.R. and War with the Newts	Karel Čapek	13 October 2011	978-0-575-09945-6
The Book of Skulls	Robert Silverberg	14 November 2011	978-1-85798-914-4
Emphyrio	Jack Vance	14 November 2011	978-1-85798-885-7
Star Maker	Olaf Stapledon	14 November 2011	978-1-85798-807-9
Floating Worlds	Cecelia Holland	8 December 2011	978-0-575-10823-3
Blood Music	Greg Bear	12 December 2011	978-1-85798-762-1
Rogue Moon	Algis Budrys	12 January 2012	978-0-575-10800-4
Dangerous Visions	Harlan Ellison	9 February 2012	978-0-575-10802-8
Eon	Greg Bear	5 March 2012	978-0-575-07316-6
Rendezvous with Rama	Arthur C. Clarke	5 March 2012	978-0-575-07733-1
Odd John	Olaf Stapledon	8 March 2012	978-0-575-07224-4
The Fountains of Paradise	Arthur C. Clarke	19 March 2012	978-1-85798-721-8
Last and First Men	Olaf Stapledon	19 March 2012	978-1-85798-806-2
The Fall of Hyperion	Dan Simmons	12 April 2012	978-0-575-09948-7
Where Late the Sweet Birds Sang	Kate Wilhelm	14 June 2012	978-0-575-07914-4
Roadside Picnic (new trans.)	Arkady and Boris Strugatsky	12 July 2012	978-0-575-09313-3
Synners	Pat Cadigan	9 August 2012	978-0-575-11954-3
Ammonite	Nicola Griffith	13 September 2012	978-0-575-11823-2
Sarah Canary	Karen Joy Fowler	13 September 2012	978-0-575-13136-1
The Continuous Katherine Mortenhoe	D. G. Compton	11 October 2012	978-0-575-11831-7
Frankenstein	Mary Shelley	11 October 2012	978-0-575-09960-9
Doomsday Book	Connie Willis	8 November 2012	978-0-575-13109-5
Flowers for Algernon	Daniel Keyes	15 November 2012	978-1-85798-938-0
The Caltraps of Time	David I. Masson	13 December 2012	978-0-575-11828-7
Unquenchable Fire	Rachel Pollack	13 December 2012	978-0-575-11854-6
Engine Summer	John Crowley	10 January 2013	978-0-575-08281-6
Take Back Plenty	Colin Greenland	10 January 2013	978-0-575-11952-9
Slow River	Nicola Griffith	14 February 2013	978-0-575-11825-6
The Gate to Women's Country	Sheri S. Tepper	14 March 2013	978-0-575-13104-0
The Sea and Summer	George Turner	14 March 2013	978-0-575-11869-0
To Say Nothing of the Dog	Connie Willis	9 May 2013	978-0-575-11312-1
Wasp	Eric Frank Russell	9 May 2013	978-0-575-12904-7
The Gods Themselves	Isaac Asimov	13 June 2013	978-0-575-12905-4
This Is the Way the World Ends	James Morrow	13 June 2013	978-0-575-08118-5
The Deep	John Crowley	11 July 2013	978-0-575-08264-9
No Enemy But Time	Michael Bishop	8 August 2013	978-0-575-09311-9
Time is the Fire: The Best of Connie Willis	Connie Willis	8 August 2013	978-0-575-13114-9
Double Star	Robert A. Heinlein	12 September 2013	978-0-575-12203-1
Revelation Space	Alastair Reynolds	12 September 2013	978-0-575-12906-1
A Fall of Moondust	Arthur C. Clarke	16 September 2013	978-0-575-07317-3
A Maze of Death	Philip K. Dick	16 September 2013	978-0-575-07461-3
The Penultimate Truth	Philip K. Dick	16 September 2013	978-0-575-07481-1
Random Acts of Senseless Violence	Jack Womack	10 October 2013	978-0-575-13230-6
Transfigurations	Michael Bishop	14 November 2013	978-0-575-09309-6
The Door Into Summer	Robert A. Heinlein	12 December 2013	978-0-575-12072-3
Dr. Bloodmoney	Philip K. Dick	9 January 2014	978-1-4732-0168-2
Half Past Human	T. J. Bass	30 January 2014	978-0-575-12962-7
The Long Tomorrow	Leigh Brackett	13 February 2014	978-0-575-13156-9
The Godwhale	T. J. Bass	13 March 2014	978-0-575-12993-1
Jem	Frederik Pohl	10 April 2014	978-1-4732-0170-5
The Shrinking Man	Richard Matheson	10 April 2014	978-1-4732-0169-9
A Case of Conscience	James Blish	15 May 2014	978-1-4732-0543-7
Her Smoke Rose Up Forever	James Tiptree Jr	10 July 2014	978-1-4732-0324-2
A Scanner Darkly	Philip K. Dick	28 August 2014	978-1-85798-847-5
Stand on Zanzibar	John Brunner	11 September 2014	978-1-4732-0637-3
The Child Garden	Geoff Ryman	27 November 2014	978-0-575-07690-7
Mission of Gravity	Hal Clement	11 December 2014	978-1-4732-0638-0
Mockingbird	Walter Tevis	27 February 2015	978-1-4732-1310-4
The Word for World Is Forest	Ursula K. Le Guin	26 March 2015	978-1-4732-0578-9
Downward to the Earth	Robert Silverberg	9 April 2015	978-1-4732-1192-6
Hard to Be a God	Arkady and Boris Strugatsky	9 April 2015	978-1-4732-0829-2
Night Lamp	Jack Vance	14 May 2015	978-1-4732-0892-6
Life During Wartime	Lucius Shepard	11 June 2015	978-1-4732-1193-3
Earth Abides	George R. Stewart	30 June 2015	978-1-4732-1433-0
Dark Benediction	Walter M. Miller	13 August 2015	978-1-4732-1194-0
The Wind's Twelve Quarters and The Compass Rose	Ursula K. Le Guin	13 August 2015	978-1-4732-0576-5
Dying of the Light	George R. R. Martin	10 September 2015	978-1-4732-1252-7
The Dispossessed	Ursula K. Le Guin	30 September 2015	978-1-4732-0606-9
The Man Who Fell to Earth	Walter Tevis	12 November 2015	978-1-4732-1311-1
Nova	Samuel R. Delany	12 November 2015	978-1-4732-1191-9
A Fire Upon the Deep	Vernor Vinge	7 January 2016	978-1-4732-1195-7
Norstrilia	Cordwainer Smith	11 February 2016	978-1-4732-1253-4
Monday Begins on Saturday	Arkady and Boris Strugatsky	14 April 2016	978-1-4732-0221-4
Fairyland	Paul J. McAuley	12 May 2016	978-1-4732-1516-0
Always Coming Home	Ursula K. Le Guin	14 July 2016	978-1-4732-0580-2
A Deepness in the Sky	Vernor Vinge	14 July 2016	978-1-4732-1196-4
Swastika Night	Murray Constantine	11 August 2016	978-1-4732-1466-8
China Mountain Zhang	Maureen F. McHugh	13 October 2016	978-1-4732-1462-0
Shadow and Claw (The Book of the New Sun, Vol. 1)	Gene Wolfe	10 November 2016	978-1-4732-1649-5
Sword and Citadel (The Book of the New Sun, Vol. 2)	Gene Wolfe	10 November 2016	978-1-4732-1200-8
Limbo	Bernard Wolfe	15 December 2016	978-1-4732-1247-3
The First Men in the Moon	H. G. Wells	12 January 2017	978-1-4732-1800-0
The Food of the Gods	H. G. Wells	12 January 2017	978-1-4732-1801-7
The Invisible Man	H. G. Wells	12 January 2017	978-1-4732-1798-0
The Island of Doctor Moreau	H. G. Wells	12 January 2017	978-1-4732-1799-7
The Shape of Things to Come	H. G. Wells	12 January 2017	978-1-4732-2165-9
The Time Machine	H. G. Wells	12 January 2017	978-1-4732-1797-3
The War of the Worlds	H. G. Wells	12 January 2017	978-1-4732-1802-4
The Left Hand of Darkness	Ursula K. Le Guin	12 April 2017	978-1-4732-2162-8
The Doomed City	Arkady and Boris Strugatsky	13 July 2017	978-1-4732-2228-1
Raising the Stones	Sheri S. Tepper	10 August 2017	978-1-4732-2265-6
The Embedding	Ian Watson	7 September 2017	978-1-4732-2267-0
Cryptozoic	Brian Aldiss	30 November 2017	978-1-4732-2273-1
Land Under England	Joseph O'Neill	26 June 2018	978-1-4732-2406-3
Raft	Stephen Baxter	10 July 2018	978-1-4732-2405-6
Dreaming in Smoke	Tricia Sullivan	23 August 2018	978-1-4732-2474-2
Fools	Pat Cadigan	7 March 2019	978-1-4732-2602-9
The Best of R. A. Lafferty	R. A. Lafferty	4 April 2019	978-1-4732-1344-9
Light	M. John Harrison	11 July 2019	978-1-4732-2767-5
Native Tongue	Suzette Haden Elgin	22 August 2019	978-1-4732-2756-9
Snail on the Slope	Arkady and Boris Strugatsky	17 October 2019	978-1-4732-2828-3
The Shockwave Rider	John Brunner	9 January 2020	978-1-4732-2830-6
Lord Valentine's Castle	Robert Silverberg	6 February 2020	978-1-4732-2922-8
River of Gods	Ian McDonald	19 March 2020	978-1-4732-2950-1
A Time of Changes	Robert Silverberg	20 August 2020	978-1-4732-2923-5
The Andromeda Anthology	Fred Hoyle and John Elliot	29 October 2020	978-1-4732-3011-8
Worlds of Exile and Illusion	Ursula K. Le Guin	15 October 2020	978-1-4732-3098-9
Bold as Love	Gwyneth Jones	12 November 2020	978-1-4732-3019-4
Desolation Road	Ian McDonald	10 December 2020	978-1-4732-3099-6
Castles Made of Sand	Gwyneth Jones	21 January 2021	978-1-4732-3020-0
The Best of Greg Egan	Greg Egan	18 March 2021	978-1-4732-3229-7
The Inhabited Island (new trans.)	Arkady and Boris Strugatsky	15 April 2021	978-1-4732-3244-0
The Separation	Christopher Priest	13 May 2021	978-1-4732-3305-8
Needle in a Timestack	Robert Silverberg	10 June 2021	978-1-4732-2920-4
White Queen	Gwyneth Jones	2 September 2021	978-1-4732-3465-9
Kairos	Gwyneth Jones	11 November 2021	978-1-4732-3466-6
Nineteen Eighty-Four	George Orwell	20 January 2022	978-1-4732-3480-2
Life	Gwyneth Jones	17 February 2022	978-1-4732-3467-3
The Chronicles of Amber	Roger Zelazny	14 April 2022	978-1-4732-2216-8
The Second Chronicles of Amber	Roger Zelazny	18 August 2022	978-1-4732-2215-1
Growing Up Weightless	John M. Ford	29 September 2022	978-1-4732-3282-2
The Secret of Life	Paul J. McAuley	13 October 2022	978-1-3996-0377-5
Roadmarks	Roger Zelazny	19 January 2023	978-1-4732-3503-8
Imperial Earth	Arthur C. Clarke	16 February 2023	978-1-4732-0142-2
The Hammer of God	Arthur C. Clarke	16 March 2023	978-1-4732-0140-8
The Best of Roger Zelazny	Roger Zelazny	26 October 2023	978-1-4732-3500-7
Hiero's Journey	Sterling Lanier	25 April 2024	978-1-3996-2051-2
First Born	Maureen Duffy	4 July 2024	978-1-3996-2335-3
The Unforsaken Hiero	Sterling Lanier	12 September 2024	978-1-3996-2057-4
Barefoot in the Head	Brian Aldiss	20 November 2025	978-1-3996-3540-0
Galaxies Like Grains of Sand	Brian Aldiss	19 February 2026	978-1-3996-3541-7
Beginning Operations (Sector General Omnibus)	James White	19 March 2026	978-1-3996-3621-6
Air	Geoff Ryman	14 May 2026	978-1-3996-4039-8
Distraction	Bruce Sterling	14 May 2026	978-1-3996-4038-1
Nova Swing	M. John Harrison	14 May 2026	978-1-3996-4036-7
Thirteen	Richard Morgan	14 May 2026	978-1-3996-4037-4
Minority Report	Philip K. Dick	25 June 2026	978-1-3996-3818-0
Alien Emergencies (Sector General Omnibus)	James White	23 July 2026	978-1-3996-3626-1
Paprika (forthcoming)	Yasutaka Tsutsui	8 October 2026	978-1-3996-23254

=== Hardcover editions (2010–2019) ===
Hardcover editions initially distributed to the U.K. market. Many printings distributed outside the U.K. market do not include markings or cover designs to indicate they are volumes of any series.

Title	Author(s)	Reprint date	ISBN
Cat's Cradle	Kurt Vonnegut	20 May 2010	978-0-575-08195-6
Childhood's End	Arthur C. Clarke	17 June 2010	978-0-575-08235-9
The Island of Doctor Moreau	H. G. Wells	17 June 2010	978-0-575-09516-8
The Time Machine	H. G. Wells	15 July 2010	978-0-575-09517-5
The Food of the Gods	H. G. Wells	16 September 2010	978-0-575-09518-2
Dune	Frank Herbert	30 December 2010	978-0-575-10441-9
The Hitchhiker's Guide to the Galaxy	Douglas Adams	10 May 2012	978-0-575-11534-7
The War of the Worlds	H. G. Wells	12 July 2012	978-0-575-11535-4
Riddley Walker	Russell Hoban	8 November 2012	978-0-575-11951-2
The Invisible Man	H. G. Wells	11 April 2013	978-0-575-11537-8
A Canticle for Leibowitz	Walter M. Miller	25 April 2013	978-0-575-07357-9
The First Men in the Moon	H. G. Wells	11 July 2013	978-0-575-11538-5
The Restaurant at the End of the Universe	Douglas Adams	28 November 2013	978-1-4732-0066-1
Life, the Universe and Everything	Douglas Adams	31 December 2013	978-1-4732-0067-8
Feersum Endjinn	Iain M. Banks	16 April 2016	978-1-4732-0251-1
The Day of the Triffids	John Wyndham	12 May 2016	978-1-4732-1267-1
The Chrysalids	John Wyndham	9 June 2016	978-1-4732-1268-8
The Midwich Cuckoos	John Wyndham	8 September 2016	978-1-4732-1269-5
Starship Troopers	Robert A. Heinlein	13 October 2016	978-1-4732-1748-5
Neuromancer	William Gibson	11 May 2017	978-1-4732-1737-9
The Man in the High Castle	Philip K. Dick	14 November 2019	978-1-4732-2347-9

=== Unpublished softcover editions ===
The following editions were announced, but appear to have been withdrawn:

Tentative Title	Author(s)	Scheduled	Known ISBN
Camp Concentration	Thomas Disch	10 August 2006	0-575-07877-4
334	Thomas Disch	9 November 2006	0-575-07897-9
The Long Loud Silence	Wilson Tucker	February 2015	978-1-4732-0773-8
The Iron Dream	Norman Spinrad	14 November 2017	978-1-4732-2264-9
Forge of God	Greg Bear	2017; 31 December 2025	978-1-4732-2266-3

== Related series ==
Other series originally marketed as S.F. Masterworks by Gollancz and its publishing partners. Many printings do not include markings or cover designs to indicate they are volumes of any series.

=== Rounded-corner editions (2006) ===
A special edition collection with matte, non-glossy covers, rounded corners and minimalist cover art by Marc Adams.

Title	Author(s)	Release date	ISBN
Cities in Flight	James Blish	1 August 2006	0-575-07898-7
The Dispossessed	Ursula K. Le Guin	1 August 2006	0-575-07903-7
Flowers for Algernon	Daniel Keyes	1 August 2006	0-575-07920-7
The Forever War	Joe Haldeman	1 August 2006	0-575-07908-8
Gateway	Frederik Pohl	1 August 2006	0-575-07899-5
I Am Legend	Richard Matheson	1 August 2006	0-575-07900-2
Lord of Light	Roger Zelazny	1 August 2006	0-575-07901-0
The Sirens of Titan	Kurt Vonnegut	1 August 2006	0-575-07902-9
The Stars My Destination	Alfred Bester	1 August 2006	0-575-07909-6
Ubik	Philip K. Dick	1 August 2006	0-575-07921-5

=== Gollancz 50th Anniversary (2011) ===
To celebrate the 50th anniversary of the Gollancz imprint, Orion published a ten-volume series of fan-chosen volumes. Each volume featured a yellow–red typeset cover art as a homage to designs used by Gollancz from 1929 until the 1980s.

No.	Title	Author(s)	Release date	ISBN
1	Shadow and Claw (The Book of the New Sun, Vol. 1)	Gene Wolfe	1 September 2011	978-0-575-11673-3
2	Do Androids Dream of Electric Sheep?	Philip K. Dick	1 September 2011	978-0-575-11676-4
3	Flowers for Algernon	Daniel Keyes	1 September 2011	978-0-575-11674-0
4	I Am Legend	Richard Matheson	1 September 2011	978-0-575-11670-2
5	Dune	Frank Herbert	1 September 2011	978-0-575-11678-8
6	The Lies of Locke Lamora	Scott Lynch	1 September 2011	978-0-575-11672-6
7	Eric	Terry Pratchett	1 September 2011	978-0-575-11669-6
8	Hyperion	Dan Simmons	1 September 2011	978-0-575-11677-1
9	The Name of the Wind	Patrick Rothfuss	1 September 2011	978-0-575-11671-9
10	The Time Machine	H. G. Wells	1 September 2011	978-0-575-11675-7

=== Golden Age Masterworks (2019–present) ===
Initially marketed as part the S.F. Masterworks series until adopting the Gold Age Masterworks series name. Yellow cover designs for the series were inspired by cover designs used by Gollancz from 1929 until the mid-1980s.

Title	Author(s)	Release date	ISBN
Doomsday Morning	C. L. Moore	10 January 2019	978-1-4732-2326-4
Fury	Henry Kuttner	10 January 2019	978-1-4732-2255-7
Galactic Patrol	E. E. 'Doc' Smith	10 January 2019	978-1-4732-2470-4
The Sands of Mars	Arthur C. Clarke	10 January 2019	978-1-4732-2236-6
Earthlight	Arthur C. Clarke	7 February 2019	978-1-4732-2237-3
Grey Lensman	E. E. 'Doc' Smith	7 February 2019	978-1-4732-2471-1
Second Stage Lensman	E. E. 'Doc' Smith	7 March 2019	978-1-4732-2472-8
Northwest of Earth	C. L. Moore	7 March 2019	978-1-4732-2254-0
Jirel of Joiry	C. L. Moore	4 April 2019	978-1-4732-2252-6
Children of the Lens	E. E. 'Doc' Smith	4 April 2019	978-1-4732-2473-5
Against the Fall of Night	Arthur C. Clarke	2 May 2019	978-1-4732-2234-2
Judgment Night	C. L. Moore	13 June 2019	978-1-4732-2253-3
The Stainless Steel Rat	Harry Harrison	19 September 2019	978-1-4732-2768-2
The Deathworld Omnibus	Harry Harrison	14 November 2019	978-1-4732-2837-5
Sidewise in Time	Murray Leinster	3 September 2020	978-1-4732-2739-2
The Outward Urge	John Wyndham	5 August 2021	978-1-4732-3072-9
Stories of Mars	Edgar Rice Burroughs	17 March 2022	978-1-4732-3482-6

=== Best of the Masterworks (2022–23) ===
==== Softcover volumes ====
Title	Author(s)	Release date	ISBN
Do Androids Dream of Electric Sheep?	Philip K. Dick	27 October 2022	978-1-3996-0774-2
The Female Man	Joanna Russ	27 October 2022	978-1-3996-0775-9
Flowers for Algernon	Daniel Keyes	27 October 2022	978-1-3996-0776-6
I Am Legend	Richard Matheson	27 October 2022	978-1-3996-0773-5
The Forever War	Joe Haldeman	24 November 2022	978-1-3996-0778-0
Gateway	Frederik Pohl	24 November 2022	978-1-3996-0780-3
Neuromancer	William Gibson	24 November 2022	978-1-3996-0777-3
The Word for World Is Forest	Ursula K. Le Guin	24 November 2022	978-1-3996-0779-7
Grass	Sheri S. Tepper	8 December 2022	978-1-3996-0782-7
The Man Who Fell to Earth	Walter Tevis	8 December 2022	978-1-3996-0783-4
Revelation Space	Alastair Reynolds	8 December 2022	978-1-3996-0781-0
Rendezvous With Rama	Arthur C. Clarke	20 July 2023	978-1-3996-1717-8
Roadside Picnic	Arkady and Boris Strugatsky	20 July 2023	978-1-3996-1720-8
Sarah Canary	Karen Joy Fowler	20 July 2023	978-1-3996-1718-5
The Body Snatchers	Jack Finney	24 August 2023	978-1-3996-1721-5
The Island of Doctor Moreau	H.G. Wells	24 August 2023	978-1-3996-1723-9
To Say Nothing of the Dog	Connie Willis	24 August 2023	978-1-3996-1719-2
The Sirens of Titan	Kurt Vonnegut	24 August 2023	978-1-3996-1722-2
Synners	Pat Cadigan	24 August 2023	978-1-3996-1725-3

==== Hardcover volumes ====
Title	Author(s)	Release date	ISBN
Dune	Frank Herbert	27 October 2022	978-1-3996-1117-6
The Hitchhiker's Guide To The Galaxy	Douglas Adams	24 August 2023	978-1-3996-1724-6

== See also ==
- Fantasy Masterworks
