= Dying Inside =

1972 novel by Robert Silverberg

- First edition cover
- Author: Robert Silverberg
- Cover artist: Jerry Thorp
- Language: English
- Genre: Science fiction
- Publisher: Charles Scribner's Sons
- Publication date: November 1972
- Publication place: United States
- Media type: Print (hardcover)
- Pages: 245
- ISBN: 0-684-13083-1
- OCLC: 524029
- Dewey Decimal: 813/.5/4
- LC Class: PZ4.S573 Dy PS3569.I472

Dying Inside is a 1972 science fiction novel by American writer Robert Silverberg. It was first serialized in Galaxy in 1972 and published in book form by Charles Scribner's Sons later that year. The novel follows David Selig, a middle-aged telepath in contemporary New York City, as the mind-reading ability that has shaped his life begins to disappear.

The novel was written during Silverberg's late-1960s and early-1970s turn toward more literary and psychologically focused science fiction, and it has often been associated with American New Wave science fiction. Rather than treating telepathy as a heroic power or adventure device, Dying Inside uses Selig's fading ability to explore isolation, aging, sexuality, identity, and the difficulty of ordinary human connection.

Contemporary reception was mixed, with some reviewers praising Silverberg's prose, characterization, and maturity, while others criticized the novel's introspection, sexual material, and uncertain position between science fiction and mainstream literary fiction. The novel was nominated for the Nebula Award for Best Novel, was a finalist for the Hugo Award for Best Novel, placed third in the novel category of the Locus Awards, and received a special award for excellence in writing at the John W. Campbell Memorial Award.

Retrospective assessments have been more favorable, frequently placing Dying Inside among Silverberg's major works and as a significant example of early-1970s American New Wave science fiction. Later critics have described it as Silverberg's signature novel, a genre classic, and a neglected classic of science fiction.

== Background and publication ==
=== Background ===
Silverberg conceived Dying Inside in December 1969 as a reversal of the familiar science-fiction story about telepathy. Instead of following a character who discovers or masters a psychic gift, the novel would follow a telepath whose ability is disappearing and who is being forced toward ordinary human limitation. The phrase "dying inside" came first, giving Silverberg both the title and the central situation of David Selig's decline.

Silverberg proposed the novel to Betty Ballantine on December 31, 1969, describing a book with the working title Dying Inside and a nonlinear, fragmented structure. The project was deferred while he completed A Time of Changes, The Second Trip, and The Book of Skulls. He began writing Dying Inside in September 1971, during a period of personal upheaval, and completed it over nine weeks while moving between New York and the Bay Area.

Silverberg's choice of setting also connects the novel to the more psychological science fiction he was writing in the early 1970s. Rather than placing telepathy in a far-future world or a conventional adventure framework, Dying Inside sets its speculative premise in contemporary New York, with Manhattan and Columbia University forming part of David Selig's social and intellectual environment. Those backgrounds drew on places familiar to Silverberg, although he cautioned against reading Selig as a disguised self-portrait.

Critical accounts place Dying Inside within Silverberg's late-1960s and early-1970s turn toward American New Wave science fiction, a period in which his work moved away from conventional adventure formulas and toward more literary, experimental, and psychologically focused fiction. In Dying Inside, that shift appears in the treatment of telepathy not as heroic power or genre spectacle, but as a means of exploring interior life, isolation, aging, sexuality, identity, and psychological decline. Later criticism has continued to treat the novel's speculative premise through this inward, psychological frame.

=== Serialization and publication ===
Dying Inside first appeared as a two-part serial in Galaxy, with installments in the July–August and September–October 1972 issues. It was published in book form by Charles Scribner's Sons in November 1972, followed by a Ballantine paperback in October 1973.

The novel's position between science fiction and mainstream literary fiction complicated its early publication history. It was difficult to market because it did not fit cleanly into either category, and it was barely in print three years after publication. Later editions included a 2002 iBooks edition and a 2005 Gollancz paperback in the S.F. Masterworks series. A 2009 paperback edition was published by Tor Books under its Orb imprint with a new preface by Silverberg, who presented the edition as an effort to introduce the book to contemporary readers after its earlier periods of uncertain availability. In 2023, Centipede Press published a signed-and-numbered limited edition with a Silverberg introduction, two Darrell Schweitzer interviews with Silverberg, new artwork by Joe Wilson, and reproductions of earlier cover art.

== Plot ==
David Selig is a 41-year-old man living in New York City. Since childhood, he has been able to read other people's minds, but by the time the novel begins, this ability is fading. Selig lives alone, has little money, and earns a living by writing term papers for Columbia University students. His telepathy has helped him do this work, but it no longer functions reliably. He begins to notice long silences where other people's thoughts used to be.

The narrative moves between Selig's present life and earlier periods in his life. As a child, Selig discovers that he can hear the thoughts of his parents, teachers, classmates, and strangers. He learns to hide the ability because other people do not understand what is happening. His parents take him to a psychologist, but the psychologist does not identify the cause of his unusual behavior. Selig grows up knowing things about people that they have not told him, and he often reacts to what they are thinking rather than to what they say aloud.

Selig's parents later adopt a daughter, Judith. David and Judith have a difficult relationship from childhood onward. Judith comes to believe that David has some unusual power, and she resents the way he seems to know things he should not know. Their arguments continue into adulthood. David both depends on Judith and avoids her, while Judith remains one of the few people who has some idea of what his life has been like.

As a boy and young man, Selig uses his power in different ways. He reads the minds of people around him at school, in public places, and during private moments. On a farm, he enters the minds of animals and people nearby. At school, a teacher interested in psychic phenomena tests students with Zener cards, and Selig has to keep himself from revealing what he can do. He learns to appear ordinary while constantly receiving the thoughts of those around him.

As an adult, Selig meets Tom Nyquist, another man who can read minds. The meeting shows Selig that he is not the only person with this ability. Nyquist, unlike Selig, has used his talent to become financially successful. The two men become friends for a time, but their relationship is uneasy. Because each can sense what the other thinks, they cannot easily hide irritation, jealousy, or contempt. Selig compares his own life with Nyquist's and sees that Nyquist has used the same gift more effectively.

Selig also looks back on his failed relationships. One of these is with Toni Huxley, a woman with whom he lives for a time. During one episode, Toni takes LSD, and Selig enters her mind while she is under the drug's influence. The experience overwhelms him and damages their relationship. Toni does not fully understand what has happened, and their connection breaks down.

Later, Selig becomes involved with Kitty Holstein. Unlike most people, Kitty's mind is closed to him. He cannot read her thoughts, and this makes her both attractive and troubling to him. Instead of accepting the limit, he tries to discover whether she has some psychic ability of her own or whether she is somehow blocking him. He asks questions, sets up tests, and becomes increasingly preoccupied with the mystery. Kitty grows tired of his behavior, and the relationship ends. She later becomes connected with Nyquist, adding to Selig's anger and humiliation.

In the present, Selig continues writing student papers while his telepathy weakens. He works for students who want essays written for them, including Yahya Lumumba, a Columbia basketball player. Selig writes a paper for Lumumba, but Lumumba refuses to pay him. When Selig tries to collect the money, the confrontation turns violent, and he is beaten. He wakes up in a hospital. Afterward, his ghostwriting work is also threatened when the university becomes aware of what he has been doing.

As his power fades further, Selig moves through the city and through his memories, trying to understand what is happening to him. He attempts to use his ability and finds that it often fails. At times he receives only weak impressions. At other times he hears nothing at all. The loss frightens him because the power has been part of his life for as long as he can remember.

Near the end of the novel, Selig has almost completely lost the ability to read minds. He reconnects with Judith, and during a visit with her and her young son, Paul, the long hostility between brother and sister begins to ease. His future remains uncertain, and the novel does not end with his power restored. Instead, Selig is left to live without the ability that separated him from other people and shaped much of his life.

== Themes and analysis ==
Dying Inside has often been discussed as an inversion of earlier science-fiction stories about telepathy. Rather than presenting mind-reading as an evolutionary advance, a superhuman power, or a device for adventure, the novel follows David Selig as he loses the ability that has defined his life. Telepathy functions less as a fantasy of mastery than as a burden: it exposes Selig to other people's thoughts while also separating him from ordinary forms of trust, privacy, and communication.

The novel links that burden to Selig's isolation. His power gives him access to other minds, but it does not make him more capable of intimacy or social belonging. His alienation is not caused by telepathy alone; it is also bound up with his evasions, resentments, voyeurism, failed relationships, and inability to sustain ordinary human contact. His family life, sexual relationships, ghostwriting work, and rivalry with Tom Nyquist all turn the supposed advantage of mind-reading into a pattern of dependence, shame, and failed connection.

Selig's fading telepathy is also read through aging and loss. The novel begins with the power already diminishing, so its central movement is not toward discovery but toward decline. Michael Dirda described the book as less a conventional science-fiction adventure than a novel about middle age, decline, and the disappearance of the self. Other accounts connect the fading power to mortality, sexual anxiety, entropy, and the erosion of an identity built around exceptional ability.

The novel's treatment of telepathy also places it in conversation with traditions outside conventional science-fiction adventure. Scholarly discussions have connected Dying Inside to modernist fiction, American Jewish fiction, and earlier genre treatments of telepaths, gifted children, and supermen. The comparison with modernism appears in the novel's allusions to T. S. Eliot, James Joyce, Samuel Beckett, Lewis Carroll, and William Shakespeare, while its Jewish literary frame has been linked to writers such as Saul Bellow, Bernard Malamud, and Philip Roth. Within those contexts, Selig becomes a diminished version of the triumphant superman figure: his difference does not free him from ordinary life, and his failures in family, love, work, and friendship undercut any heroic reading of his gift.

The structure of Dying Inside reinforces its inward focus. The novel combines present-tense narration with memories, essays, confessional passages, and shifts among first-person, second-person, third-person, and essay-like modes. These changes keep the reader's relation to Selig unstable, moving between closeness and distance as he loses the faculty through which he has understood both himself and others. The result is a narrative form that mirrors Selig's own fragmentation without treating telepathy as a purely technological or plot-driven device.

The ending has been read as deliberately ambivalent. Selig's loss of power can be understood as a final diminishment, but several accounts also treat it as a possible release from the condition that has kept him apart from others. His reconciliation with Judith and his movement toward ordinary human limitation suggest that losing telepathy may make real contact possible, even as the novel leaves him without the ability that had shaped his sense of self.

== Reception ==
Contemporary response to Dying Inside was mixed. Some trade reviews were skeptical of the novel's introspective approach. Kirkus Reviews described the premise of David Selig's fading telepathic power but found the book slower and less tense than Silverberg's other work, while Library Journal characterized it as a stream-of-consciousness account of fading mind-reading and judged it bleak and sexually explicit. An unsigned review in the Times Literary Supplement described the novel as less concerned with aliens than with alienation, but found it too heavy and self-pitying to sustain its premise.

Within the science-fiction field, the novel drew both strong praise and pointed criticism. Richard E. Geis praised the serialized version in 1972, commending Silverberg's detail, observation, prose, characterization, and maturity; he later judged Dying Inside more satisfying and more clearly science-fictional than The Book of Skulls. Other early genre criticism valued the book as a character study in which plot was subordinated to David Selig's inner life. Negative responses focused on the same qualities from the opposite direction, objecting to its sexual material, its reliance on introspection and confession, and its position near the boundary between science fiction and mainstream fiction.

The novel nevertheless received major awards recognition. It was nominated for the 1972 Nebula Award for Best Novel, was a finalist for the 1973 Hugo Award for Best Novel, and placed third in the novel category of the 1973 Locus Awards; Isaac Asimov's The Gods Themselves won all three of those awards. Dying Inside also received a special award for excellence in writing at the 1973 John W. Campbell Memorial Award.

Retrospective assessments have generally placed Dying Inside among Silverberg's most highly regarded works. Reviewing the 2009 reissue, Michael Dirda wrote that the novel was widely regarded as Silverberg's masterpiece and emphasized its treatment of middle age, decline, and the loss of identity rather than conventional science-fiction adventure. In a later overview of Silverberg's career, Dirda called Dying Inside Silverberg's signature novel and compared its literary effect to Philip Roth's Portnoy's Complaint.

Other later accounts have treated the novel as a significant example of Silverberg's early-1970s work and of American New Wave science fiction. Jo Walton described it as a genre classic that combines mainstream literary qualities with a science-fictional premise, and later wrote that it was the standout book of the 1972 Hugo field. The Encyclopedia of Science Fiction places the novel among Silverberg's major works from the period, while later assessments have described it as perhaps his finest novel, a neglected classic of science fiction, and a key text of American New Wave science fiction.
