= Science Fiction: The 100 Best Novels =

1985 book by David Pringle

Science Fiction: The 100 Best Novels, An English-Language Selection, 1949–1984
- Author: David Pringle
- Language: English
- Subject: Science fiction
- Genre: Nonfiction
- Published: 1985
- Publisher: Xanadu
- Pages: 224
- ISBN: 9780947761110
- OCLC: 12522525

Science Fiction: The 100 Best Novels, An English-Language Selection, 1949–1984 is a nonfiction book by David Pringle, published by Xanadu in 1985 with a foreword by Michael Moorcock. Primarily, the book comprises 100 short essays on the selected works, covered in order of publication, without any ranking. It is considered an important critical summary of the science fiction field.

Pringle followed Science Fiction with Modern Fantasy: The 100 Best Novels (1988). Xanadu followed Science Fiction with at least three more "100 Best" books (below).

== The List ==
1. Nineteen Eighty-Four by George Orwell (1949)
2. Earth Abides by George R. Stewart (1949)
3. The Martian Chronicles by Ray Bradbury (1950)
4. The Puppet Masters by Robert A. Heinlein (1951)
5. The Day of the Triffids by John Wyndham (1951)
6. Limbo by Bernard Wolfe (1952)
7. The Demolished Man by Alfred Bester (1953)
8. Fahrenheit 451 by Ray Bradbury (1953)
9. Childhood's End by Arthur C. Clarke (1953)
10. The Paradox Men by Charles L. Harness (1953)
11. Bring the Jubilee by Ward Moore (1953)
12. The Space Merchants by Frederik Pohl and C. M. Kornbluth (1953)
13. Ring Around the Sun by Clifford D. Simak (1953)
14. More Than Human by Theodore Sturgeon (1953)
15. Mission of Gravity by Hal Clement (1954)
16. A Mirror for Observers by Edgar Pangborn (1954)
17. The End of Eternity by Isaac Asimov (1955)
18. The Long Tomorrow by Leigh Brackett (1955)
19. The Inheritors by William Golding (1955)
20. The Stars My Destination by Alfred Bester (1956)
21. The Death of Grass by John Christopher (1956)
22. The City and the Stars by Arthur C. Clarke (1956)
23. The Door into Summer by Robert A. Heinlein (1957)
24. The Midwich Cuckoos by John Wyndham (1957)
25. Non-Stop by Brian Aldiss (1958)
26. A Case of Conscience by James Blish (1958)
27. Have Space Suit—Will Travel by Robert A. Heinlein (1958)
28. Time Out of Joint by Philip K. Dick (1959)
29. Alas, Babylon by Pat Frank (1959)
30. A Canticle for Leibowitz by Walter M. Miller, Jr. (1959)
31. The Sirens of Titan by Kurt Vonnegut, Jr. (1959)
32. Rogue Moon by Algis Budrys (1960)
33. Venus Plus X by Theodore Sturgeon (1960)
34. Hothouse by Brian Aldiss (1962)
35. The Drowned World by J. G. Ballard (1962)
36. A Clockwork Orange by Anthony Burgess (1962)
37. The Man in the High Castle by Philip K. Dick (1962)
38. Journey Beyond Tomorrow by Robert Sheckley (1962)
39. Way Station by Clifford D. Simak (1963)
40. Cat's Cradle by Kurt Vonnegut Jr. (1963)
41. Greybeard by Brian Aldiss (1964)
42. Nova Express by William S. Burroughs (1964)
43. Martian Time-Slip by Philip K. Dick (1964)
44. The Three Stigmata of Palmer Eldritch by Philip K. Dick (1965)
45. The Wanderer by Fritz Leiber (1965)
46. Norstrilia by Cordwainer Smith (1965)
47. Dr. Bloodmoney by Philip K. Dick (1965)
48. Dune by Frank Herbert (1965)
49. The Crystal World by J. G. Ballard (1966)
50. Make Room! Make Room! by Harry Harrison (1966)
51. Flowers for Algernon by Daniel Keyes (1966)
52. The Dream Master by Roger Zelazny (1966)
53. Stand on Zanzibar by John Brunner (1968)
54. Nova by Samuel R. Delany (1968)
55. Do Androids Dream of Electric Sheep? by Philip K. Dick (1968)
56. Camp Concentration by Thomas M. Disch (1968)
57. The Final Programme by Michael Moorcock (1968)
58. Pavane by Keith Roberts (1968)
59. Heroes and Villains by Angela Carter (1969)
60. The Left Hand of Darkness by Ursula K. Le Guin (1969)
61. The Palace of Eternity by Bob Shaw (1969)
62. Bug Jack Barron by Norman Spinrad (1969)
63. Tau Zero by Poul Anderson (1970)
64. Downward to the Earth by Robert Silverberg (1970)
65. The Year of the Quiet Sun by Wilson Tucker (1970)
66. 334 by Thomas M. Disch (1972)
67. The Fifth Head of Cerberus by Gene Wolfe (1972)
68. The Dancers at the End of Time by Michael Moorcock (1972)
69. Crash by J. G. Ballard (1973)
70. Looking Backward, from the Year 2000 by Mack Reynolds (1973)
71. The Embedding by Ian Watson (1973)
72. Walk to the End of the World by Suzy McKee Charnas (1974)
73. The Centauri Device by M. John Harrison (1974)
74. The Dispossessed by Ursula K. Le Guin (1974)
75. Inverted World by Christopher Priest (1974)
76. High Rise by J.G. Ballard (1975)
77. Galaxies by Barry N. Malzberg (1975)
78. The Female Man by Joanna Russ (1975)
79. Orbitsville by Bob Shaw (1975)
80. The Alteration by Kingsley Amis (1976)
81. Woman on the Edge of Time by Marge Piercy (1976)
82. Man Plus by Frederik Pohl (1976)
83. Michaelmas by Algis Budrys (1977)
84. The Ophiuchi Hotline by John Varley (1977)
85. Miracle Visitors by Ian Watson (1978)
86. Engine Summer by John Crowley (1979)
87. On Wings of Song by Thomas M. Disch (1979)
88. The Walking Shadow by Brian Stableford (1979)
89. Juniper Time by Kate Wilhelm (1979)
90. Timescape by Gregory Benford (1980)
91. The Dreaming Dragons by Damien Broderick (1980)
92. Wild Seed by Octavia E. Butler (1980)
93. Riddley Walker by Russell Hoban (1980)
94. The Complete Roderick by John Sladek (1980)
95. The Shadow of the Torturer by Gene Wolfe (1980)
96. The Unreasoning Mask by Philip José Farmer (1981)
97. Oath of Fealty by Larry Niven and Jerry Pournelle (1981)
98. No Enemy But Time by Michael Bishop (1982)
99. The Birth of the People's Republic of Antarctica by John Calvin Batchelor (1983)
100. Neuromancer by William Gibson (1984)

== Scope ==
In the introduction Pringle offers the working definition, "Science fiction is a form of fantastic fiction which exploits the imaginative perspectives of modern science." In turn, modern science is the "scientific world-view ... as it has come to be accepted by the intelligent layperson", which arguably "first became common property in the mid to late 19th century."

Within fiction he distinguishes science fiction from "Supernatural Horror" and "Heroic Fantasy". They may be represented by Dracula and The Lord of the Rings, featuring "the irruption of some supernatural force into the everyday world" and "set in completely imaginary worlds" respectively. He also names the subclass "Fabulations", which do not belong in this book "unless they have a significant scientific or technological content". (Note: Example fabulations are Brian Aldiss, The Malacia Tapestry (1976) and John Crowley, Little, Big (1981). Pringle's subsequent book Modern Fantasy: The 100 Best Novels (1988) covers both of those works and its introduction adds the "Fabulation" category more formally. Briefly, in a fabulation the real-world setting is distorted "in ways other than the supernaturally horrific" (Modern Fantasy, 19).)

In contrast, science fiction has a real-world setting and "fantastic developments which are explicable in terms of the scientific world-view." World-view does not mean accepted theory or fact: "many sf writers cheat: they use sleight-of-hand rather than genuine scientific knowledge." "The skilful use of pseudo-science and gobbledygook" may be good enough to exploit the world-view.

The time period covered is approximately that for science fiction as a category of book publication, although the selected books were not all published in that category.

Pringle admits that fewer than thirty selections may generously be called even "masterpieces of their sort". On the whole,

Some of them are old favourites of my own ... Some are other people's favourites, novels which have been outstandingly popular or influential, or which seem to be especially good representatives of their type. A small minority, perhaps as many as ten, are books for which I have little or no personal enthusiasm: they have been included for the sake of balance and variety.

== 100 Best series ==
Xanadu Publications of London published at least four "100 Best" books. Transatlantic editions or simply jacket and cover designs may variably use "the" and "hundred" in the subtitles. Carroll & Graf published the books in the U.S.

- Science Fiction: The 100 Best Novels, by David Pringle (1985), foreword by Michael Moorcock
- Crime and Mystery: The 100 Best Books, by H.R.F. Keating (1987), foreword by Patricia Highsmith
- Horror: The 100 Best Books, edited by Stephen Jones and Kim Newman (November 1988)
- Fantasy: The 100 Best Books, by James Cawthorn and Michael Moorcock (November 1988)

Xanadu commissioned Moorcock to write Fantasy. When it became "clear that I would not be able to deliver it for a long time, the publishers and I agreed that James Cawthorn was the person to take it over." Cawthorn was the primary author of the selections "mainly", according to Cawthorn, and of the text "by far", according to Moorcock. (Fantasy, "Introduction", p. 9. The introduction, pp. 8–10, comprises a long section signed by Cawthorn, a short one signed by Moorcock, and joint unsigned "Notes and Acknowledgments".)

Science Fiction is a collection of 100 reviews, nearly uniform in length (all one to two pages), with a moderately long introduction by the author.

Horror comprises essays on 100 different books by 100(?) horror writers, apparently more-than-one- to less-than-six pages in length.

Fantasy is a collection of 100 reviews, nearly uniform in length (little short of two pages), with a short introduction by the authors separately and jointly.

== Reception ==
Dave Langford reviewed Science Fiction: The 100 Best Novels for White Dwarf #73, and stated that "Most of my favourites are there, and only a scattering of dodgy selections - like Mack Reynolds, an 'ideas and concepts' man whose writing makes my teeth hurt."

== Reviews ==
- Review by L. J. Hurst (1985) in Paperback Inferno, #57
- Review by Dan Chow (1986) in Locus, #300 January 1986
- Review by Brian Stableford (1986) in Fantasy Review, February 1986
- Review by Edward James (1986) in Vector 130
- Review by Andy Watson (1986) in PKDS Newsletter, #11
- Review by Fernando Quadros Gouvea (1986) in Science Fiction Review, Winter 1986
- Review by Gregory Feeley (1986) in Foundation, #36 Summer 1986
- Review by Doug Fratz (1986) in Thrust, #24, Summer 1986
- Review by Baird Searles (1987) in Isaac Asimov's Science Fiction Magazine, June 1987
- Review by Don D'Ammassa (1988) in Science Fiction Chronicle, #100 January 1988
- Review by Tom Easton (1988) in Analog Science Fiction/Science Fact, August 1988
- Review by Darrell Schweitzer (1989) in Aboriginal Science Fiction, July–August 1989
- Review by Matthew Appleton (1999) in The New York Review of Science Fiction, July 1999
