= Rogue Moon =

1960 novel by Algis Budrys

- Original first edition cover, with a misleading precis of the plot
- Author: Algis Budrys
- Cover artist: Richard M. Powers
- Language: English
- Genre: Science fiction
- Publisher: Gold Medal Books
- Publication date: November 1960
- Publication place: United States
- Media type: Print (paperback)
- Pages: 176

Rogue Moon (1960) is a short science fiction novel by Lithuanian-American writer Algis Budrys (1931-2008). It was a 1961 Hugo Award nominee. A substantially shortened version of the novel was originally published in F&SF; this novella-length story was included in The Science Fiction Hall of Fame, Volume Two, edited by Ben Bova. It was adapted into a radio drama by Yuri Rasovsky in 1979.

Rogue Moon is largely about the discovery and investigation of a large alien artifact found on the surface of the Moon. The object eventually kills its explorers in various ways—more specifically, investigators "die in their effort to penetrate an alien-built labyrinth where one wrong turn means instant death", but their deaths slowly reveal the funhouse-like course humans must take in moving through it.

== Synopsis ==
Dr. Edward Hawks runs a top-secret project for the United States Navy investigating a large alien artifact found on the Moon. Hawks has created a matter transmitter which scans a person or object to make a copy at receivers on the Moon. The earthbound person is placed in a state of sensory deprivation which allows him to share the experiences of his doppelgänger. The copies enter and explore the alien labyrinth, but are killed for violating the unknown rules in force within the structure. Each explorer gets a little further and learns a bit more about what they can and cannot do. However, none of the participants have been able to remain sane after experiencing death second-hand.

Vincent "Connie" Connington, Continental's head of personnel, tells Hawks that he has found the perfect candidate for the next mission. He takes Hawks to see Al Barker, an adventurer and thrill-seeker. Hawks also meets Barker's girlfriend, Claire Pack, a sociopath of a different kind. Where Connington covets power, and Barker seems to love death, Claire enjoys using sex, or the prospect of sex, to manipulate men. Connington wants her, but she stays with Barker because he has no weaknesses in her eyes. Hawks has to appeal to Barker's dark side to persuade him to join the project. Claire tries to get under Hawks' skin while simultaneously playing Connington off against Barker.

Barker is the first to retain his sanity after dying in the artifact, but even he is deeply affected, exclaiming, "...it didn't care! I was nothing to it!" He returns again and again, advancing a little farther each time. His relationship with Claire deteriorates, even as Connington continues his disastrous attempts to win her, at one point receiving a severe beating from Barker. Eventually, Connington announces he is quitting, and Claire leaves with him.

Meanwhile, Hawks starts a relationship with a young artist, Elizabeth Cummings, and expresses his torment over the project to her.

Finally, Barker announces that he is almost finished. Hawks takes Elizabeth to a romantic location and declares his love for her, then transmits himself to the Moon, where his duplicate joins Barker's on the final run. Together, the two weave their way through a series of bizarre landscapes containing death traps, before emerging out the other side.

Hawks tells Barker that they cannot return to Earth. The equipment on the Moon is too crude to transmit a man back safely, and even if it were possible, there are already people living their lives. All the men working on the Moon are duplicates, mostly Navy men, all volunteers. Hawks elects to remain outside until his air runs out. Barker returns to try to be transmitted back anyway. Back on Earth, Hawks removes his isolation suit and finds a note in his hand, which he knew would be there. It reads simply, "Remember me to her."

== Themes ==
Science fiction scholar Jeff King wrote that the novel's major themes are "the meaning of life and humanity's yearning to transcend death. Algis Budrys uses the trip through the alien labyrinth as a metaphor for life." Therefore, "Barker's discovery when he makes it completely through the alien structure" is that "a person must create himself or herself." King adds that a secondary theme is: "Human beings are possessed of more than the ability to reason and to function in the physical universe. They also feel, and development of that quality is as important as development of any other."

A reviewer for SFF World disagreed with Jeff King, considering the novel to be about death or dying; he referred to Arthur C. Clarke when he opined, "Rogue Moon seems to be initially a great exploration puzzle, about a large alien artefact found on the surface of the Moon. All attempts to explore it leads to the intrepid explorers being killed or going insane in various ways, but their deaths slowly reveal that the process of dying is the point: that and by dying in various ways by moving through it humans learn something about themselves, as presumably would the aliens, should they still exist. It is a Clarkean test, an ordeal that humans must pass in order to evolve and develop beyond their present state. As this shows, Rogue Moon is a deeper and more complex novel than we expect at first."

== Reception ==
The novel was chosen in 2012 for the SF Masterworks series by publisher Victor Gollancz Ltd.

David Pringle included the novel in his book Science Fiction: The 100 Best Novels (Xanadu, 1985, ISBN 978-0-947761-10-3). Nick Rennison and Stephen E. Andrews, similarly, included it in their 100 Must-Read Science Fiction Novels.

In contemporary reviews, Alfred Bester called Rogue Moon "one of the finest flashes of heat lightning to dazzle us this year," saying it "has come very close to realizing our ideal of science fiction, the story of how human beings may be affected by the science of the future." Bester, however, faulted the ending as unresolved, declaring that Budrys "brought his book to a semi-cadence at exactly the point where it cried for completion." In counterpoint, James Blish declared the novel "a masterpiece... not only a bequest but a monument." He found that Budrys had "cunningly constructed his ambiguity" in the novel's conclusion, and proved "that a science fiction novel can be a fully realized work of art."

Scholar/critic John Clute said that, in comparison with Budrys's earlier novels, such as False Night (1954) and Who? (1958), Rogue Moon is "much more thoroughly successful" and "now something of an sf classic":

A good deal has been written about the highly integrated symbolic structure of this story, whose perfectly competent surface narration deals with a Hard-SF solution to the problem of an alien labyrinth, discovered on the Moon, which kills anyone who tries to pass through it. At one level, the novel's description of attempts to thread the labyrinth from Earth via Matter Transmission makes for excellent traditional sf; at another, it is a sustained rite de passage, a doppelgänger conundrum about the mind-body split, a death-paean. There is no doubt that AB [Algis Budrys] intends that both levels of reading register, however any interpretation might run; in this novel the two levels interact fruitfully.

Graham Sleight, another science fiction scholar, writes that Rogue Moon takes the themes of Who? — "identity, ethics, memory, scientific obsession — and intensifies its gaze on them. But it also has a new concern, death. Like its predecessor, it uses an almost arbitrary science-fictional device to examine an existential question, in a way that a mimetic novel never could." Then Hawks hires Barker: "It appears, though it's scarcely the point of Rogue Moon, that there's a complex permitted route through the artefact, and that any deviation from it will be fatal. Therefore, ultimate success for Barker will be to emerge on the other side of the artefact."

Jeff King wrote, "Rogue Moon was written relatively early in Budrys's career, yet his style is fully evident. He employs an almost minimalist approach that calls for careful word selection to paint vivid pictures while studiously avoiding flowery, overlong sentences. Like others of his well-known works, this is a short novel, seemingly Budrys's preferred length."

Carl Sagan in 1978 listed Rogue Moon as among the "rare few science‐fiction novels [that] combine a standard science‐fiction theme with a deep human sensitivity".

At the SF Site, reviewer John DeNardo gave the book 3 out of 5 stars, saying, "The artifact was an intriguing puzzle; the story kept interest levels up. ... The premise is an intriguing one." DeNardo adds that "the ability to duplicate people on the Moon" provides "a nice healthy dose of wow factor." But he grew bored with the characters ("too much of the book centers on the characters of Hawks, Barker, Claire (Barker's lover), and Vincent Connington (the personnel director). While their stories are somewhat interesting, I really wanted to see more of the BDO," and he recommends to readers "the novella on which it was based."
