= Greybeard =

1964 novel by Brian Aldiss

- First UK edition
- Author: Brian Aldiss
- Genre: Science fiction
- Publisher: Faber & Faber (UK); Harcourt, Brace and World (cloth) (US); Signet (mass market)
- Publication date: 1964 (cloth); 1965 (mass market paperback)
- Pages: 237 (UK); 245 (US); 207 (US paperback)
- OCLC: 1222334

Greybeard is a science fiction novel by British author Brian Aldiss, published in 1964.

== Plot summary ==
Set decades after the Earth's population has been sterilised as a result of nuclear bomb tests conducted in Earth's orbit, the book shows a world emptying of humans, with only an ageing, childless population left. The story is mainly told through the eyes of Algernon "Algy" Timberlane (the titular Greybeard) and his wife, Martha.

== Publishing history ==
Since its first publication by Faber & Faber and Harcourt, Brace and World in 1964, it has had numerous reprints and translations, including Romanian, Norwegian, Japanese, Dutch, Swedish, Slovenian, Polish, Hungarian, Portuguese, Czech, Danish, Spanish, German and French. It was included in the Gollancz science fiction reprint series, SF Masterworks.

== Reception ==
The book is included in Interzone editor David Pringle's Science Fiction: The 100 Best Novels (1985).
