= A Time of Changes =

1971 novel by Robert Silverberg

- Cover of the first hardcover edition
- Author: Robert Silverberg
- Cover artist: Brad Holland
- Language: English
- Genre: Science fiction
- Published in: Galaxy (March, April, and May–June 1971 issues)
- Publisher: Nelson Doubleday
- Publication date: 1971 (hardcover)
- Publication place: Garden City, New York, United States
- Media type: Print (hardcover)
- Pages: 183
- OCLC: 150304
- Dewey Decimal: 813/.5/4
- LC Class: PZ4.S573 Tk

A Time of Changes is a 1971 science fiction novel by Robert Silverberg. It takes the form of an autobiography written in a society where the words "I" and "me" are obscene. Its narrator, Kinnall Darival, writes in hiding on the planet Borthan. He recounts how he came to defy the religious taboo against revealing his thoughts and feelings by sharing a drug that allows people to enter one another's minds.

Galaxy published the novel in three installments in 1971, and Nelson Doubleday issued it in hardcover the same year. It won the 1971 Nebula Award for Best Novel and was a finalist for the 1972 Hugo Award for Best Novel.

P. Schuyler Miller praised the novel's psychological depth. Brian Stableford read it as an exploration of isolation and empathy, noting that Kinnall's account invites readers to sympathize with him. Steven Lehman linked the mind-sharing drug to the American counterculture's interest in expanded consciousness in the 1960s. In his reading, the drug offers temporary relief from the isolation Kinnall hopes to overcome.

== Background and publication ==
Robert Silverberg recalled writing A Time of Changes in 1970 and described it as more emotional than most of his work. In a 2019 interview, he identified communication between people as his chief interest as a writer and named A Time of Changes and Dying Inside as the two novels most representative of that interest.

Galaxy published the novel in three installments in its March, April, and May–June 1971 issues. Nelson Doubleday published a hardcover edition. Reviewing the novel in 1972, P. Schuyler Miller described the magazine version as a condensation.

In a 1974 review, Brian Stableford observed that Silverberg's novels had appeared in a different order in Britain than in the United States. He argued that British readers who already knew some of Silverberg's later work were encountering A Time of Changes out of sequence, making it harder to follow his development as a writer. Éditions Opta published Alain Dorémieux's translation, Le Temps des changements, in Paris in 1974. Silverberg reported in October 1975 that the novel was then out of print in the United States. Orb Books reissued it in 2009 with a new introduction by Silverberg and a map of Borthan.

== Plot ==
In a cabin in the Burnt Lowlands of Borthan, Kinnall Darival writes an account of his life while in hiding. On Velada Borthan, the planet's northern continent, the descendants of human settlers live under a religious code called the Covenant. Speaking openly about one's thoughts and feelings is an offense known as selfbaring, and people regard words such as "I" and "me" as obscene. Kinnall breaks the taboo from the opening of his account, naming himself and writing in the first person.

Kinnall grows up in Salla, the younger son of its ruler, the prime septarch. As a child he gains two companions through ceremonial bonds: a bondbrother, Noim Condorit, and a bondsister, Halum Helalam. Bond-siblings can confide in one another, but a sexual relationship between them is forbidden. Kinnall falls in love with Halum and conceals his feelings. When a hornfowl kills his father during a hunt, Kinnall's elder brother, Stirron, succeeds him. Fearing that Stirron will see him as a rival, Kinnall leaves Salla.

In the neighboring province of Glin, Kinnall's relatives turn him away, and his passport is revoked. He conceals his identity and works at a logging camp. After leaving the camp, he stays with a farming family before finding passage to Manneran as a crewman aboard a merchant ship. There Halum's father, Segvord Helalam, gives him a job in the port administration. Over the next fifteen years, Kinnall becomes a wealthy official and is welcome again at Stirron's court. He marries Halum's cousin Loimel, drawn to her resemblance to Halum. They have five children, but Kinnall still loves Halum and remains distant from his wife.

Through his work, Kinnall meets Schweiz, a trader from Earth. The two speak freely about matters Kinnall rarely discusses, including their religious beliefs. Schweiz brings him a drug from the southern continent of Sumara Borthan. At a secluded lodge they take it together, and each experiences the other's thoughts and memories. Kinnall decides that he wants others to know what it is like to share their minds. He and Schweiz travel to Sumara Borthan, where they take the drug with a group of villagers and trade for a supply to bring back to Manneran.

Kinnall shares the drug with others in Manneran, including several high officials. Noim tries it but finds the experience disturbing and warns Kinnall against giving it to Halum. Kinnall also confides in Jidd, a religious confessor known as a drainer. Despite the secrecy of confession, Jidd reports him. Warned of his impending arrest, Kinnall escapes across the border with the help of men who have shared the drug with him. He takes refuge on Noim's estate in Salla.

Halum visits the estate and asks to try the drug. Kinnall fears that she will discover his desire for her, but agrees. When the effects wear off, he tries to tell her that he loves her and still cannot bring himself to say "I". They part for the night. By morning, Halum has taken her own life by entering a pen of dangerous animals called stormshields. Noim blames Kinnall, who flees to the Burnt Lowlands and begins his manuscript.

Noim finds Kinnall at the cabin and offers to help him escape. Unwilling to put Noim in danger, Kinnall stays behind but entrusts him with the manuscript. Noim promises to read and preserve it. When Stirron arrives with armed men, Kinnall drinks the drug and urges his brother to join him. Stirron refuses, saying that abandoning the Covenant would destroy the social order, and places Kinnall under arrest.

Alone in the guarded cabin, Kinnall has a vision of Noim circulating copies of his account. He sees the drug pass from person to person until even the rulers share their minds with the rest of Borthan. As the drug wears off, Kinnall recognizes the vision as his own imagining. Awaiting removal to Salla, he hopes to get these last pages to Noim so that they can be joined to the manuscript.

== Themes and analysis ==
Claude Ecken argues that the taboo against speaking about oneself in A Time of Changes limits self-knowledge: in keeping their feelings from others, people also come to understand them less well. Brian Stableford reads the novel in terms of the tension between isolation and empathy. Steven Lehman compares the taboo on saying "I" with a similar prohibition in Ayn Rand's Anthem. In his reading, the two novels give the recovery of the first person different meanings: Rand emphasizes the value of the individual self, while Silverberg emphasizes what people can share with one another.

The drug in the novel allows those who take it together to share their thoughts directly. In Drug Themes in Science Fiction, Silverberg writes that this contact gives rise to a "subculture of love and openness". Lehman draws a parallel between the mind-sharing drug and the interest in expanded consciousness associated with Timothy Leary and Richard Alpert in the American counterculture of the 1960s. In Lehman's reading, the drug offers temporary relief from isolation but also symbolizes the lasting change Kinnall seeks. He cautions against reading the novel as a simple endorsement of drug use. Russell Letson places the novel alongside Silverberg's Downward to the Earth and Nightwings, identifying spiritual renewal and messianic themes in all three works.

Kinnall opens his account by naming himself and promising to tell his own story. Jean-Louis Peyre reads this departure from the impersonal speech of Kinnall's society as a challenge to its customs and compares the opening with the autobiographical writings of Jean-Jacques Rousseau. Peyre also compares the relationship between language and power in Silverberg's novel with its treatment in Jack Vance's The Languages of Pao and George Orwell's Nineteen Eighty-Four. For Stableford, hearing the story in Kinnall's own voice invites readers to sympathize with him. Lehman regards Kinnall as an unreliable narrator and cautions against taking his convictions for Silverberg's own.

== Reception ==
In 1972, Analog reviewer P. Schuyler Miller regarded A Time of Changes as a contender for the best science-fiction novel of 1971. He found it subtler than Silverberg's The World Inside and praised its psychological depth. For Miller, Kinnall's self-conscious narration revealed both his character and the customs of his society, though some readers might tire of it. In Foundation in 1974, Brian Stableford praised the small details that made Borthan vivid but questioned whether its society could endure: "I can't see it lasting five thousand years or five generations".

In a review published in translation in SF Commentary in 1977, Stanisław Lem likened the taboo against speaking about oneself to an enchantment and the drug that breaks it to a counterspell. For Lem, this fairy-tale premise kept the novel from seriously exploring whether drugs could free people from repression. In the same issue, George Turner argued that Silverberg turned Kinnall's rebellion into an adventure story before exploring the ideas behind it. He counted the novel among Silverberg's works whose endings resolved the plot but left the underlying question open.

In a 1982 survey of Silverberg's fiction, Malcolm Edwards called A Time of Changes "the weakest of his later novels", arguing that Silverberg had written more effectively about redemption and the sharing of minds elsewhere. Claude Ecken, by contrast, counted it among Silverberg's major works in a 1998 review for Bifrost. Writing in the same magazine in 2008, Jean-Louis Peyre found that the novel suffered by comparison with Frank Herbert's Dune, but emphasized the intimacy of Silverberg's story and praised the emotional force of his prose.

A Time of Changes won the 1971 Nebula Award for Best Novel. It was a finalist for the 1972 Hugo Award for Best Novel, which went to Philip José Farmer's To Your Scattered Bodies Go. In that year's Locus readers' poll, Ursula K. Le Guin's The Lathe of Heaven placed first in the novel category, Farmer's novel second, and A Time of Changes third. Silverberg's novel was also nominated for the Ditmar Award in the international science-fiction category, which Larry Niven's Ringworld won.
