= The Man Who Never Forgot =

1958 short story by Robert Silverberg

"The Man Who Never Forgot" is a science fiction short story by Robert Silverberg. It was first published in The Magazine of Fantasy & Science Fiction in February 1958.

== Synopsis ==
Tom Niles has perfect memory of everything he has seen or heard since birth — which makes it nearly impossible for him to sustain any sort of relationship with anyone.

== Reception ==
Damien Broderick has called it "pretty good early Silverberg", and considers that it is "shaped a lot like" Silverberg's 1972 novel Dying Inside — a similarity which has also been noted by Paul Kincaid.

Paul di Filippo observed that it "most vividly" depicts the disadvantages of "camera-perfect memory". Harlan Ellison declared that the story "spoke to the alienation with which we all suffer".
