= Nova (novel) =

1968 science fiction novel by Samuel R. Delany

- First edition (hardcover)
- Author: Samuel R. Delany
- Cover artist: Russell FitzGerald
- Language: English
- Genre: Science fiction
- Publisher: Doubleday
- Publication date: 1968
- Publication place: United States
- Media type: Print (hardback & paperback)
- Pages: 279

Nоva is a science fiction novel by American writer Samuel R. Delany published in 1968. The plot concerns the spaceship captain Lorq Von Ray's search for a nova, which will produce the essential power source Illyrion, and his vendetta with the Red family, who seek to kill him. Nominally space opera, it explores the politics and culture of a future where cyborg technology is universal, yet making major decisions can involve using tarot cards. It has strong mythological overtones, relating to both the Grail Quest and Jason's quest for the Golden Fleece.

Nova was nominated for the Hugo Award for Best Novel in 1969. In 1984, David Pringle listed it as one of the 100 best science-fiction novels written since 1949.

After Delany completed Nova at the age of 25, his published output stopped for several years, although his writing continued. His next published novel was the pornographic Equinox in 1973.

== Synopsis ==
The novel is set in 3172, when most humans belong to one of two factions: Earth-based Draco and the Pleiades Federation. The most important family in Pleiades is the Von Rays, and the most important in Draco is the Reds, who own Red-shift Limited, a company making interstellar drives. Starship travel depends on Illyrion, a rare and valuable power source.

The story begins on Triton. A blind man named Dan tells a young drifter called the Mouse how he flew on Lorq Von Ray's starship, the Roc, and how he was injured in a dangerous voyage. A flashback to the Mouse's childhood follows, explaining how he stole a sensory syrynx (a machine capable of producing sound, images, and scents) and learned to play it from his friend Leo.

Lorq recruits the Mouse and other passers-by for a journey on the Roc. One is Katin, an intellectual who aspires to write a novel. Others are the brothers Lynceos and Idas, whose third brother is an indentured Illyrion miner; Sebastian, owner of flying pets; and his companion Tyÿ, a tarot reader. Lorq plans to fly through a nova to acquire seven tons of Illyrion. As the crew members leave Triton, Dan falls into a burning canyon and dies.

The third chapter is a flashback to Lorq's youth, beginning with his boyhood on the planet Ark, when he meets Prince Red and his sister Ruby. Prince was born without an arm and has an artificial one. As they play, Lorq mentions Prince's arm, angering him. Later, they sneak out to an arena and see Lorq's parents and the Reds' father watching animals fight.

Lorq becomes a starship racing pilot; his crew comprises Brian and Dan. He meets Prince again at a party, where Brian mentions Prince's arm. Lorq asks Ruby to run away with him, but Prince finds them and punches Lorq, scarring his face. Lorq's father describes how his great-grandfather secured the Pleiades Federation's independence by piracy and attacking Red-shift's mines, leading to a feud between the families. He also explains that the lower price of Illyrion from the Outer Colonies will shift the balance of power in the galaxy, bringing about the downfall of the Red family and ending Draco and Earth's dominance. Therefore, the two families are trying to destroy each other. Lorq wonders where to get Illyrion; later, Dan tells him how his ship accidentally fell into a nova but survived.

The main narrative resumes. Tyÿ gives Lorq a tarot reading about the mission; however, the Mouse has stolen a card. The Roc arrives at the planet Vorbis, and Lorq visits his aunt Cyana, who tells him a star likely to explode soon. Prince sends Lorq a message bragging that he destroyed Brian's life because he mentioned his arm, and that he intends to kill Lorq. Meanwhile, the Mouse visits some hunters and reunites with Leo. Ruby attacks Lorq, but one of Sebastian's pets saves him and the Roc returns to Pleiades.

The crew try to relax, but Prince and Ruby arrive. They argue with Lorq; Prince states that Lorq's quest will ruin both Draco and the Outer Colonies. Lorq replies that he is fighting for change, and Prince for stasis. Prince then reveals why he hates Lorq: their visit to the arena on Ark showed him how vicious and cruel his father could be. Sebastian and Lorq attack Prince and Ruby; Lorq uses the sensory syrynx to overwhelm their senses, leaving them seriously injured near a river of lava.

The Roc travels to the star, but Prince and Ruby reappear. Lorq boards their ship, and the star begins to erupt. Lorq seizes control and flies toward the star, killing Prince; Ruby dies too and Lorq flies through the nova, collecting the Illyrion but injuring his brain.

At the end of the novel, Katin and the Mouse leave the Roc and Katin declares that his novel should be about the Roc's last voyage. Echoing Katin's observation that stories about the quest for the Holy Grail are never finished, the last sentence of the novel is incomplete.

== Characters ==
- Lorq Von Ray. Lorq is the scion of the wealthy Von Ray family, the most powerful clan in the Pleiades Federation. Originally a carefree playboy, Lorq is drawn into his family's feud with the Reds and, as a result, becomes obsessed with finding Illyrion. When Prince Red attacks him as a teenager at a fabulously opulent party in Isle St.-Louis in Paris, he scars Lorq's face badly; but Lorq refuses to remove the scarring for the rest of the novel and as a result carries an air of menace.
  As the book unfolds, Lorq learns that his family was founded by pirates, who killed members of the Red family in previous generations in order to keep the Pleiades free of Earth-based corporations, although Lorq's ancestors did so with the support of the Pleiades' citizens. The Reds, however, still carry a grudge.
  Although Lorq Von Ray is described as looking between forty-five and fifty years old, according to the dates in the book he is barely thirty. The explanation for this discrepancy between Lorq's actual age and older appearance is provided in the Mouse's speculation that Lorq is "aged, not old". He has a Norwegian father and a Senegalese mother from Earth.
- The Mouse. This is the nickname for Pontichos Provechi, a young Gypsy from Earth, who, by age 18, has led an extremely varied life, and is just beginning to work in a starship navigation crew. He also entertains people by creating illusions and music with his sensory syrynx, a sound, scent, and hologram projector.
- Katin Crawford. Katin is an intellectual from Earth's moon, who received a liberal arts education at Harvard University and who has worked till now at a series of unfulfilling clerical positions. Katin is a loner. His passion is to explore various moons across the Solar System. He also aspires to write a novel, for which he constantly records notes, although the form is obsolete by the time Nova takes place. Sometimes Katin annoys his colleagues by going off on long lectures on any number of topics.
- Sebastian and Tyÿ. This wandering, working couple consists of Sebastian, a strong-looking man who is nonetheless gentle, and his companion, Tyÿ, a quiet mysterious woman and tarot-card reader. Sebastian is always accompanied by a number of unusual flying pets, his "flapping black gillies." Like many of Delany's characters, Sebastian is racially mixed: although he has Asian features, his hair is naturally blond. Sebastian and Tyÿ are from the Pleiades and consider it an honor to work for the Von Ray family.
- Lynceos and Idas. These brothers—two members of a set of triplets—are of African descent, but Lynceos is an albino. Hailing from the Outer Colonies, all three brothers had a tendency to use drugs and make mischief. As a result of one of their pranks, they ended in a form of indentured servitude and were forced to work in the colonies' Illyrion mines. The two talk in tandem.
  Characters like the Mouse, Lynceos, Idas, Tyÿ, Sebastian, and Katin can be seen as hippies, with itinerant lifestyles and drugs.
- Prince Red. The scion of the Earth-based Red family, Prince was born with only one arm. In place of the other, he wears an artificial limb, which has unnatural strength. Its grip can compress sand into quartz crystals, which he can throw with the force of bullets. A troublemaker from birth (in his youth, he was forced constantly to shift schools because of discipline problems), he detests Lorq for numerous reasons, some of which he is not consciously aware of.
  Because of the power his artificial arm gives him, Prince can become extremely violent if anyone so much as mentions his deformity. As a little boy, he sprains Lorq's mother's wrist when she asks for his hand to take him home when he has gotten into mischief after dark.
- Ruby Red. Prince's younger sister, Ruby, is a quiet-spoken woman, who appears to be completely under Prince's control. As an adolescent, Lorq falls in love with her, but she rebuffs him because of their families' hostile histories.
  Prince appears to have an unhealthy attachment to his sister—which, often, she seems to reciprocate. While their father, Aaron, is still alive at the time of the novel and in charge of the Red's vast industrial holdings, Prince and Ruby are the most visible members of the Red clan.
- Dan. An Australian drifter and former member of Lorq's crew, Dan is the first to suggest to Lorq how a nova might be a source for Illyrion. Unfortunately, by the beginning of the novel, an accident on the first mission has damaged his senses and his sanity. He kills himself soon into the book, and most of his appearances take place in flashbacks.

== Setting ==
Nova is set in a science fictional universe with high technology, including interstellar travel and large-scale use of cyborg adaptions. Most people use intravenous drips for nutrition rather than eating, and disease is considered to be impossible. The novel is an obsolete art form and has been replaced by the "psychorama".

However, in contrast to the technological background, tarot-reading is considered both scientific and accurate. In chapter four, Tyÿ gives Lorq the most detailed tarot reading in the novel. As a child, he also had a tarot reading mentioning a death in his family, about a month before his uncle, Secretary Morgan, was assassinated. Later, Cyana makes Lorq draw a card before she gives him the nova's location.

Politically, the galaxy is divided between three factions: Draco, based on Earth, and the earliest area to be colonized; the younger Pleiades Federation; and the even newer Outer Colonies, where Illyrion is mined rather than manufactured. In chapter three, Lorq's father explains these regions in terms of social class. Draco is primarily controlled by corporations and governments based on Earth. Pleiades was settled later by "small businesses... cooperative groups; even private citizens...a comparatively middle class movement". Lorq's great-great-grandfather attacked ships from Draco, including those owned by Red-shift, attempting to expand into Pleiades, helping assure its independence. A few generations before the novel begins, planets much further from the Galactic Center were discovered to possess Illyrion, and corporations in Draco and Pleiades subsidized people "from the lowest population strata" to move there.

Economic tensions have created a feud between the "new money" Von Ray family and the "old money" Red family, both of whom have a large stake in intergalactic transportation. Shortly before the novel's events (within the lifetime of Lorq's father), the Pleiades region achieved political autonomy from Draco, and is now an independent federation. At the time of the novel, citizens of the Outer Colonies are beginning to support the idea of independence as well.

=== Technology and science ===
Illyrion is a fictional superheavy element with an atomic weight above 300, explained as being part of the hypothetical island of stability. It is a powerful energy source; a few grams provide enough energy for a starship. Katin estimates that 8-9,000 kg has been mined.

Almost all the characters in the book are cyborgs, equipped with four sockets (in the small of the back, back of the neck, and both wrists) that allow the user to connect directly to a computer. These can be used to control starships or less complicated machines; in the opening scene, one character uses it to control a "sweeper" to clean the floor. People using these sockets are called "cyborg studs".

The sockets are based on the ideas of a 23rd century philosopher and psychologist, Ashton Clark, and are intended to counteract the alienation caused by the separation between work and life. When the plugs and sockets were invented, work was done directly by people, reducing mental illness and making war impossible.

=== Future history ===
The 20th century is a pivotal period in Nova's future history. Cyana, a curator at the Alkane Museum, claims that almost a quarter of its galleries are devoted to the period. She justifies this by saying that the it encompasses the greatest change in humanity's fundamental situation: "At the beginning of that amazing century, mankind was many societies living on one world; at its end, it was basically what we are now: an informatively unified society that lived on several worlds."

Characters make frequent references to 20th century culture. At Prince's party in Paris, a group of entertainers performs a song by The Mamas & the Papas. Katin makes an offhand remark indicating that Monopoly is still in existence, and mentions Bertrand Russell and Susanne Langer as renaissance figures.

The novel refers repeatedly to a historic Vega Republic, which tried to secede from Draco in 2800. Katin states that they tried to create original art, and calls them a "last stand for cultural autonomy". However, the secession failed, and Vegan art and architecture has been absorbed by the wider culture in what he calls a "parlor game".

== Themes ==
=== Intertextuality ===
Nova has a number of motifs in common with Delany's later works; for example, the Mouse, a damaged artist who wears one shoe as does the Kid in the later Dhalgren, is a "classic Delany protagonist" in the mold of Jean Genet and François Villon and a precursor to the Kid in Dhalgren. Other motifs include Katin, an intellectual and writer who attempts to record the events around him; the twins Lynceos and Idas, one black, the other albino; and Dan, a barefoot derelict, with a rope holding up his pants.

The novel has also been compared to sea stories, with Dan recalling the blind pirate Pew in Treasure Island and Lorq Von Ray the captain of the Flying Dutchman, and described as suggesting "Moby Dick at a strobe-light show". The name of Lorq's previous ship, the Caliban, is a reference to the character Caliban in William Shakespeare's play The Tempest.

Nova also refers to other space operas. A planet is named "Trantor", after Isaac Asimov's Foundation trilogy, and the name Ashton Clark alludes to the writer Clark Ashton Smith. Ruby Red has a poisoned tooth, recalling Frank Herbert's Dune. Prince's ability to squeeze sand into glass and quartz fragments strongly parallels the power of many action heroes (most notably Superman), and the idea of aristocratic families feuding in space is found in numerous other space opera novels. The character of Katin is partially written to resemble the classic "bore" in science fiction literature—a character who constantly gives lectures and explanations to describe the universe of the book. In Nova, however, Katin is constantly ridiculed for filling this role and on occasion is used for comic relief.

However, although Nova is a full-blooded space opera, it is also a counter to the ideology of expansion into and colonization of space. It is a work of postcolonial science fiction that appropriates the genre's traditions and conventions to open up space to imagine an alternative.

=== Myth ===
Nova also makes heavy use of myth. An author's note at the beginning of the book thanks Helen Adam and Russell FitzGerald for their help with Grail and tarot research. Reviewers and academics have compared it to the story of Prometheus and the Holy Grail, but the correspondences are not explicit. Jo Walton has suggested that the story is what has been prefigured by myth, or that the tale of Lorq Von Ray has had other tales attached to it. For instance, Lorq Von Ray has been compared to Prometheus. Idas and Lynceos share names with two of the Argonauts, the brothers Idas and Lynceus of Messene. Katin notes the story's "archetypal patterns" at the close of the story.

=== Tarot ===
Much of the story revolves around a tarot reading Tyÿ gives Lorq at the beginning of the second mission, in which she rather successfully predicts the stakes and outcome. For example, The Tower appears, indicating that a powerful family (presumably the Reds or Von Rays) will fall, and the large number of pentacles indicates wealth. Prince and Ruby are represented by the King of Swords and the Queen of Swords, respectively. An anomaly in the reading, however, occurs when Tyÿ drops The Sun—which Lorq considered to represent a nova—and the Mouse pockets it, thus making it impossible for Tyÿ's reading to include this card.

Smaller tarot readings dot the rest of the novel. As a young child, Lorq receives a reading indicating a death in his family: within a month, his Uncle Morgan is assassinated. Likewise, Lorq's Aunt Cyana (Morgan's widow) has Lorq choose a single tarot card for insight: it is The Hanged Man, reversed, indicating that Lorq will succeed in his quest, but at a very high price.

The tarot used in Nova is a modified Rider–Waite deck. Lorq is most closely concerned with tarot; he is unwilling or unable to begin his quest without Tyÿ's reading, suggesting that the cards can satisfy human needs that technology is unable to assuage. However, the Mouse also benefits from its use, as it helps him remember his mother using them to help her people. At the end of the novel, he asks Tyÿ for a reading.

=== Art ===
The two artists in Nova represent different kinds of art: the Mouse's sensory syrynx playing is spontaneous and instinctive, and on the other hand Katin's novel is carefully considered but not begun. However, while talking to the Mouse, Katin equates writing his novel to playing the sensory syrynx. Both create sensory experiences which then summon up memories, thoughts, and emotions related to those sensations. A deeper similarity is illuminated by Katin's remark that novels were primarily about relationships, and the obsolescence of the form implies that people in Nova's milieu are generally solitary and lonely. However, art can make people consider these relationships, such as when the Mouse experiences Leo's playing and thinks of his parents, analyzing the difference in his relationships with them.

Katin, the aspiring novelist, frequently records notes about what his novel should be like. The definition of the novel is one of Nova's themes; contemporary Delany works with aesthetic concerns include Empire Star's concentration on point of view and Dhalgren's emphasis on the relationship between creative writing and criticism. Judith Merril's review goes so far as to call Nova "an experimental approach to literary criticism". By the end of the novel, it is clear that the novel Katin will write is Nova itself.

Another image of the work of art in Nova is the distinction between Katin and Lorq Von Ray at the end of the novel, after they have both experienced the nova. Lorq looks into the heart of the nova and his senses are overloaded; however Katin, who looked at it after the Roc left the core, is inspired to create art by organizing his experiences through controlled aesthetic techniques.

=== Race ===
Delany has consistently created black characters to populate his science fiction, and race is both obvious and essential to Nova. The main character, Lorq, is mixed-race; his father is of Norwegian descent, and his Earth-born mother is Senegalese. This prevented the novel from being serialised in Analog before publication. The Mouse is Romani (referred to in the text as a "gypsy"); his real name is Pontichos Provechi.

The residents of the Pleiades Federation (and the Outer Colonies) overall are an extremely mixed racial population. In addition to appearances, characters from the Pleiades sometimes have names that indicate a mixed racial heritage. For example, Lorq's friend Yorgos Satsumi has a clearly Japanese last name, but a first name that is decidedly Greek.

This is in sharp contrast to the Earth-centered Draco society, and the Red family are consistently referred to as Caucasian. Individuals from Earth also tend to have extremely "WASPish" names. For example, Brian's full name is Brian Anthony Sanders. Moreover, according to the Mouse, Earth still has problems with racism; he recalls seeing Gypsies lynched when he was younger.

The crew of the Roc are mixed in both 20th century terms—Lorq, Idas, and Lynceos are of African descent; Sebastian is a blond Asian (referred to in the text as "Oriental"); the Mouse is Romani—and in their own milieu, in terms of origin and economic class. Idas and Lynceos hail from the Outer Colonies, Katin and the Mouse from Draco, and Tyÿ, Sebastian, and Lorq from Pleiades. Lorq, at the center of the novel, is attracted to Ruby, angering Prince and reigniting their feud, even if his blackness is secondary to his identity as a Von Ray. Although race is different in the world of Nova, it still matters. However, Lorq is able to struggle against the Reds as equals and in the end, the fate of the galaxy turns on the abilities of a black man.

=== Politics ===
The setting of Nova is vague, but is explicitly defined as an empire, and it depends on Illyrion mining in the peripheral Outer Colonies. The name of the planet where Lynceos and Idas worked, Tubman, is a direct allusion to the American abolitionist Harriet Tubman. Colonial history is thus mapped onto the galactic setting. The Red family symbolize the continuation of colonialism and empire; but because of Lorq's victory, the mining colonies will be closed, and the workers freed.

=== Man and machine ===
Description of work before Ashton Clark and Souquet's plugs and sockets resembles the alienated, dehumanizing labor described in Karl Marx's Economic and Philosophic Manuscripts of 1844. However, work with the sockets links labor to life, allowing unalienated work. This resembles Michael Hardt and Antonio Negri's idea of "living labor", subverting the alienations of capitalism and providing an alternative to it, while affirming the worker rather than the product.

Although Delany sees technology as both a constructive and destructive force, he also sees it as having limits; it is not the sole determiner of a culture or a personality. Cooperation, or community, is needed for Lorq's success, as the whole diverse crew must work together to succeed. And despite the humanizing effect of plug and socket labor, the freedom from alienation that it ensures has limits. Tarot and superstitions, such as the Mouse spitting in the river, are vital psychological supports. Meanwhile, plugs and sockets are unable to cure Prince's issues, and he remains a selfish, indulgent, and incestuous murderer pursuing his economic monopoly.

== Style ==
Delany uses a careful prose style to present his work both sensually and metaphorically. He uses language to differentiate the characters; for instance, people from Pleiades speak with verbs at the ends of their sentences, and Lynceos and Idas begin and finish each other's sentences. The same is true for point of view; due to their different upbringings, Katin, the Mouse, and Lorq all have different perspectives on the assassination of the politician Morgan. Also, each page in the book carries a header that gives the year and location of the scene (e.g., "Draco, Earth, Paris, 3162"). This is useful because of the flashbacks in the long journey around the galaxy.

The novel's prose style has been called "poetic", with every metaphor serving the larger design. The sensory syrynx is an example of this. The name alludes to the Greek god Pan's pipes; moreover, early in the novel, the Mouse refers to it as his "ax". This is both a weapon and a slang term for a guitar, fitting both the functions it performs in the novel. Furthermore, it symbolizes writing and invokes the Cretan labrys, implying the labyrinth. This allusive style has been described as a way to overcome the linearity of prose and enrich the text by invoking the textus, or web of meanings, in which Delany considers any given text to reside.

Another example of this is the word nova itself; literally, it denotes a supernova, but it is also the plural of novum, Latin for "new thing", a term that can be used to mean science fictional inventions. Lorq describes the nova is a place where all law, human and natural, breaks down, to which the Mouse replies that the voyage will be "real changey". As the title indicates, this is the novel's central metaphor: the destructive implosion/explosion of an entire sun, which both destroys most of a solar system and creates new elements.

== Publishing history ==
Cover of 2002 paperback edition

While awaiting publication by Doubleday, Nova was submitted to Analog editor John W. Campbell for potential serialization. Campbell rejected the novel, saying in a telephone conversation with Delany's agent that, though he had enjoyed the book, he did not feel his magazine's readership "would be able to relate to a black main character."

Because there was no magazine serialization, however, in its first six months the novel did not get the initially wide exposure to readers that might have helped gain it a Hugo Award.

Bantam Books' 14th and final printing of the novel was in 1990. After this it was out of print until 2001, when Gollancz reissued it as part of their SF Masterworks line. In 2002, Vintage published a new edition with some textual changes. The Library of America included it in their 2019 anthology American Science Fiction: Four Classic Novels 1968–1969, and in 2022 Centipede Press published a limited hardback edition including tarot cards designed by Russell FitzGerald, who created the original cover art.

=== Textual changes ===
In the original novel, Lorq's crew member Brian disappears without explanation after a single chapter. In later editions, Prince sends Lorq a message while he is visiting the Alkane museum, describing how, with no more provocation than a careless comment Brian made about Prince's arm, he used his wealth and power to systematically destroy Brian's life until he became homeless and died of exposure. Prince claims that he has killed some two dozen others in a similar manner for similar reasons.

This passage significantly alters Prince's characterization. In the first edition, the worst that could be said of Prince is that he had been "spoiled" and had a violent temper. The new material turns him into a remorseless murderer and adds a moral component to Lorq's quest absent in the earlier versions.

However, the above passage is in both the original typescript of Nova and Delany's handwritten version of the novel in his notebooks from 1967. These are in the Samuel R. Delany papers in the Beinecke Rare Book and Manuscript Library, part of Yale University Library. Delany omitted it when a friend who had read the manuscript found the section too extreme. However, when Algis Budrys' review complained about Brian's absence, Delany decided to restore Prince's message to the novel so readers would know what happened to Brian. This was present in editions printed for book clubs a few months later.

Additionally, in the first edition of Nova it is unclear whether or not Lorq's parents are still alive by the time the novel ends. When Lorq begins his quest, his mother is already dying of a degenerative disorder, but at the end he makes no mention of them, nor does he try to contact them. However, in another (much briefer) passage added in the Vintage Books edition, related to the above, Lorq has a memory that implies both of his parents and Aaron Red died during the past ten years. This is in neither the original typescript nor in the notebook version, and is a true addition.

== Reception ==
Algis Budrys reviewed the novel in Galaxy Magazine, declaring that:

Samuel R. Delany, right now, as of this book, Nova, not as of some future book or some accumulated body of work, is the best science-fiction writer in the world, at a time when competition for that status is intense. I don't see how a writer can do more than wring your heart while explaining how it works. No writer can.

He praised Nova as "highly entertaining to read" and commended Delany's integration of his sociopolitical extrapolation into his story, his accomplished characterization, and his "virtuosity" in presenting the novel's "classically posed scientific puzzle".

However, Judith Merril's review in The Magazine of Fantasy and Science Fiction was mixed. She noted the variety of readings it allowed and experiences it detailed:

Here are (at least some of) the ways you can read Nova: as fast-action far-flung interstellar adventure; as archetypal mystical/mythical allegory (in which the Tarot and the Grail both figure prominently); as modern myth told in the SF idiom ... The reader observes, recollects, or participates in a range of personal human experience including violent pain and disfigurement, sensory deprivation and overload, man-machine communion, the drug experience, the creative experience—and interpersonal relationships which include incest and assassination, father-son, leader-follower, human-pet, and lots more.

However, she described it as "more of a fascinating exercise than a satisfying achievement" and "somehow lacking". Kirkus Reviews said that though Delany had "an extensive imagination", the reader might be overwhelmed. The review in the British New Wave magazine New Worlds by M. John Harrison, while acknowledging the skill and energy with which it had been written, critiqued it for being "bedded in the genre's most stifling traditions."

Nova was soon regularly referred to as "the perfect science fiction novel". It was nominated for the Hugo Award for Best Novel in 1969. In 1984, David Pringle listed it as one of the 100 best science-fiction novels written since 1949.

Jo Walton wrote articles about Nova on Tor.com in 2009 and 2010, describing it as "one of the best of Delany's early works" and noting that it had aged well and felt "cutting edge". She called the setting "a fully realised and kaleidoscopic future" with "surprisingly interesting economics". However, she thought the female characters were few and poorly developed. Alan Brown also reviewed the novel for Tor.com in 2018, opining that it was "a classic of the genre" with few obvious anachronisms. Marian Womack described it as a "SF classic" that "feels more prescient than ever" in 2025.

== Influence ==
Nova is considered one of the major forerunners of the cyberpunk movement. It prefigures, for instance, cyberpunk's staple motif of humans interfacing with computers via implants; however, in Nova these are not used to enter cyberspace but to control physical machinery.

William Gibson has said he was influenced by Delany, and Nova has been described as the stylistic bridge between Alfred Bester's The Stars My Destination and Gibson's Neuromancer. Neuromancer includes allusions to Nova. The character Peter Riviera resembles the Mouse in that he also has holographic projection powers (although via implants) and is introduced in Istanbul; but unlike Delany's character, he is a psychopath. Likewise, Gibson includes a character who awkwardly wears only one shoe; this character, Ashpool, is an insane killer.

== Adaptation ==
In 2023, it was reported that Neil Gaiman was adapting the novel into an Amazon Prime Video series.
