= Of Men and Monsters =

1968 novel by William Tenn

- First edition
- Author: William Tenn
- Cover artist: Stephen Miller
- Language: English
- Genre: Science fiction
- Publisher: Ballantine Books
- Publication date: June 1968
- Publication place: United States
- Media type: Print (hardback & paperback)
- Pages: 251 pp
- OCLC: 5086030

Of Men and Monsters is a science fiction novel by American writer William Tenn, published in June 1968 as a paperback by Ballantine Books. The book is an expansion of his story "The Men in the Walls", originally published in Galaxy Science Fiction in October 1963. Of Men and Monsters is Tenn’s only full-length novel, as the majority of his other stories are novellas.

== Plot summary ==
The storyline introduces giant, technologically superior aliens who have conquered Earth. People live like vermin in holes in the insulation material of the walls of the homes the monsters have built, sneaking out to steal food and other items from the aliens. A complex social and religious order has evolved, with women preserving knowledge and working as healers, while men serve as warriors and thieves. For the aliens, human beings are just a nuisance, neither civilized nor intelligent, and are generally regarded as vermin to be exterminated.

The novel opens with the story of Eric, a boy who is a member of a tribe that calls itself "Mankind". In order for Eric to become an adult, he must undergo a ceremonial rite of passage in which he must venture out on his own into monster territory and steal some item from them which the tribe can then use for themselves. As he is about to embark on his adventure, Eric learns that his uncle has been a secret supporter of a very different philosophy – the idea that "Ancestor-Science" failed to repel the aliens when they first came and therefore to seek the old "science" would be futile. It would be wiser to try to gain knowledge of "Alien-Science" and then to turn it against the monsters. Eric goes out into alien territory to prove himself and ends up meeting some more people who also believe that alien science is the answer to escaping from their predicament. However, on his return to the burrows, Eric finds an insurrection led by his uncle has failed and he is now an outcast. What follows is Eric's journey from boy to man, from follower to leader and ultimately from captivity to deliverance.

== Reviews and reception ==
In Science Fiction Weekly, Adam-Troy Castro called the novel "imaginative and often witty", but faulted the characterization as "both simple and schematic", noting that "(n)obody's interesting, not even the hero."

Jo Walton described it as "simultaneously an adventure story taking itself seriously and a parody of an adventure story, played for laughs", and lauded the conclusion as "a happy ending, a funny ending, an emotionally satisfying ending, but an ending that’s typically, wryly, and exclusively Tenn."

== Publication ==
The book was originally published in June 1968 by Ballantine in a mass market paperback edition. More reprints have followed through the years, including a Gollancz Science Fiction Collectors' Edition. Other language editions and reprints include:

- 1969 - Gli uomini nei muri (Mass market paperback in Italian) by Mondadori, Urania #521
- 1972 - Von Menschen und Monstren (Paperback in German) by Heyne
- 1991 - Lidé a Netvoři (Paperback in Czech) by Ivo Železný
- 2001 - Here Comes Civilization (Hardback in English) by NESFA Press
- 2011 - Of Men and Monsters (Kindle edition in English) by Gateway
