= Dhalgren =

1975 novel by Samuel Delany

- Author: Samuel R. Delany
- Cover artist: Dean Ellis
- Language: English
- Genre: Science fiction
- Publisher: Bantam Books
- Publication date: January 1975
- Publication place: United States
- Media type: Print (Paperback)
- Pages: 879 (first edition, paperback)
- ISBN: 0-552-68554-2 (first edition, paperback)
- OCLC: 16303763

Dhalgren is a 1975 science fiction novel by American writer Samuel R. Delany. It features an extended trip to and through Bellona, a fictional city in the American Midwest cut off from the rest of the world by an unknown catastrophe. It is number 33 on the 20th Century's Greatest Hits: 100 English-Language Books of Fiction list.

== Plot overview ==
The city of Bellona is severely damaged; radio, television, and telephone signals do not reach it. People enter and leave by crossing a bridge on foot.

Inexplicable events punctuate the novel: One night the perpetual cloud cover parts to reveal two moons in the sky. One day a red sun swollen to hundreds of times its normal size rises to terrify the populace, then retreats across the sky to set on the same horizon. Street signs and landmarks shift constantly, while time appears to contract and dilate. Buildings burn for days, but are never consumed, while others burn and later show no signs of damage. Gangs roam the nighttime streets, their members hidden within holographic projections of gigantic insects or mythological creatures. The few people left in Bellona struggle with survival, boredom, and each other.

The novel's protagonist is "the Kid" (sometimes "Kidd"), a drifter who has partial amnesia: he cannot remember either his own name or those of his parents, though he knows his mother was an American Indian. He wears only one sandal, shoe, or boot (as do characters in two other Delany novels and one short story: Mouse in Nova (1968), Hogg in Hogg (1995), and Roger in "We, in Some Strange Power's Employ Move on a Rigorous Line" (1967)). Possibly he has schizophrenia: the novel's narrative is intermittently incoherent (particularly at its end), the protagonist has memories of a stay in a mental hospital, and his perception of reality and the passages of time sometimes differ from those of other characters. Over the course of the story he also experiences significant memory loss. In addition, he is dyslexic, confusing left and right and often taking wrong turns at street corners and getting lost in the city. It is therefore unclear to what extent the events in the story are the product of an unreliable narrator.

Delany has stated that "Kid's sanity remains in question ... for the same reason the disaster of the city is unexplained: such explanations would become a fixed signified straiting the play and interplay of the signifier – the city of signs – that flexes and reflexes above it."

== Synopsis ==
In a forest somewhere outside the city, the protagonist meets a woman and they have sex. After, he tells her that he has "lost something"—he cannot remember his name. She leads him to a cave and tells him to enter. Inside, he finds long loops of chain fitted with miniature prisms, mirrors, and lenses. He dons the chain and leaves the cave, only to find the woman in the middle of a field, turning into a tree. Panicked, he flees. Many characters in the novel wear the same sort of "optic chain" (all will be uncomfortable discussing how they came to have it). On a nearby road, a passing truck stops to pick him up. The trucker, hauling artichokes, drops him off at the end of a suspension bridge leading across the river to Bellona.

As he crosses the bridge in the early morning darkness, the young man meets a group of women leaving the city. They ask him questions about the outside world and give him a weapon: a bladed "orchid," worn around the wrist with its blades sweeping up in front of the hand.

Once inside Bellona, an engineer, Tak Loufer, who was living a few miles outside of the city when the initial destruction happened, meets and befriends him. Tak has moved to Bellona and stayed there ever since. Upon learning that he cannot remember his name, Tak gives him a nickname—the Kid. Throughout the novel he is also referred to as "Kid", "Kidd", and often just "kid". Next Tak takes Kid on a short tour of the city. One stop is at a commune in the city park, where Kid sees two women reading a spiral notebook. When Kid looks at it, we see what he reads: The first page contains, word-for-word, the first sentences of Dhalgren. As he reads further, however, the text diverges from the novel's opening.

In Chapter II, "The Ruins of Morning", Kid returns to the commune the next day and receives the notebook from Lanya Colson, one of the two women from the evening before. Shortly they become lovers. Their relationship lasts throughout the book. We meet or learn about several other characters, including George Harrison, a local cult hero and rumoured rapist; Ernest Newboy, a famous poet visiting Bellona by invitation of Roger Calkins, publisher and editor of the local newspaper, The Bellona Times; Madame Brown, a psychotherapist; and, later in the novel, Captain Michael Kamp, an astronaut who, some years before, was in the crew of a successful Moon landing.

The notebook Kid receives already has writing throughout, but only on the right hand pages. The left hand pages are blank. Glimpses of the text in the notebook, however, are extremely close to passages in Dhalgren itself, as if the notebook were an alternate draft of the novel. Other passages are verbatim from the final chapter of Dhalgren. It is here in Chapter II that Kid begins using the blank pages of the notebook to compose poems. The novel describes the process of creating the poems—the emotions and the mechanics of the writing itself—at length and several times. We never see the actual poems, however, in their final form. Kid soon revises or removes any line that does appear in the text.

The third and longest chapter, "House of the Ax", involves Kid's interactions with the Richards family: Mr. Arthur Richards, his wife Mary Richards, their daughter June (who may or may not have been raped publicly by George Harrison, whom she is now fixated on), and son Bobby. Through Madame Brown they hire Kid to help them move from one apartment to another in the mostly-abandoned Labry Apartments. Led by Mary Richards, they are "keeping up appearances." Mr. Richards leaves every day to go to work—though no office or facility in the city seems to be in operation—while Mrs. Richards acts as though there's nothing truly disastrous happening in Bellona. By some force of will, she causes almost everyone who comes into contact with her to play along. While carrying a carpet to the elevator, June backs Bobby into an open elevator shaft, where he falls to his death. There is reason to believe that June did this intentionally after Bobby threatened to reveal her relationship with George Harrison to the family.

The third chapter is also where successful poet Ernest Newboy befriends Kid. Newboy takes an interest in Kid's poems and mentions them to Roger Calkins. By the end of the chapter, Calkins is preparing to print a book of Kid's poems.

As the novel progresses, Kid falls in with the Scorpions, a loose-knit gang, three of whom have severely beaten him earlier in the book. Almost accidentally, Kid becomes their leader. (Much of this suggests the American "mythical folk hero," Billy the Kid, whom Delany used in his earlier, Nebula Award-winning novel, The Einstein Intersection [1967].) Denny, a 15-year-old Scorpion, becomes Kid's and Lanya's lover, so that the relationship with Lanya turns into a lasting three-way sexual linkage. Kid also begins writing things other than poems in the notebook, keeping a journal of events and his thoughts.

In Chapter VI, "Palimpsest", Calkins throws a party for Kid and his book, Brass Orchids, at his sprawling estate. At Calkins's suggestion, Kid brings along twenty or thirty friends: the Scorpion "nest." While Calkins himself is absent from the gathering, there are extended descriptions of the interactions between what is left of Bellona's high society and, in effect, a street gang. At the party, Kid is interviewed by William (later passages of the book suggest William's last name is "Dhalgren," but this is never confirmed).

In the concluding Chapter VII, "The Anathemata: a plague journal", bits of the whole now and again appear to be laid out. Shifting from the omniscient viewpoint of the first six chapters, this chapter comprises numerous journal entries from the notebook, all of which appear to be by Kid. Several passages from this chapter have, however, already appeared verbatim earlier in the novel when Kid reads what was already in the notebook—written when he received it. In this chapter rubrics run along beside many sections of the main text, mimicking the writing as it appears in the notebook. (In the middle of this chapter, a rubric running contains the following sentence: I have come to to wound the autumnal city.) Recalling Kid's entry into the city, the final section contains a near paragraph-for-paragraph echo of his initial confrontation with the women on the bridge. This time, however, the group leaving is almost all male, and the person entering is a young woman who says almost exactly what Kid did himself at the beginning of his stay in Bellona.

The story ends:

But I still hear them walking in the trees: not speaking.
Waiting here, away from the terrifying weaponry, out of
the halls of vapor and light, beyond holland into the
hills, I have come to

As with Finnegans Wake, the unclosed closing sentence can be read as leading into the unopened opening sentence, turning the novel into an enigmatic circle.

== Major themes ==
=== Mythology ===
Writing in the Libertarian Review, Jeff Riggenbach compared Dhalgren to the work of James Joyce. A quotation from his review was included on the inside advertisement page of the fifteenth printing of the Bantam edition. As the critic and novelist William Gass writes of Joyce, "The Homeric parallels in Ulysses are of marginal importance to the reading of the work but are of fundamental importance to the writing of it...Writers have certain ordering compulsions, certain ordering habits, which are part of the book only in the sense that they make the writing possible. This is a widespread phenomenon." Almost certainly this is also the case with Dhalgren: Writing about the novel both as himself and under his pseudonym K. Leslie Steiner, Delany has made similar statements and suggested that it is easy to make too much of the mythological resonances. As he says, they are merely resonances, and not keys to any particular secrets the novel holds.

=== Circular text, multistable perception, echoes, and repeated imagery ===
Delany has pointed out that Dhalgren is a circular text with multiple entry points. Those points include the schizoid babble that appears in various sections of the story. Hints along those lines are given in the novel. Besides the Chapter VII rubric mentioned above (containing the sentence "I have come to to wound the autumnal city"—the exact sentence that would be created by joining the novel's unclosed closing sentence to the unopened opening) the most obvious is the point where Kid hears "grendal grendal grendal grendal" going through his mind and suddenly realizes he was listening from the wrong spot: he was actually hearing "Dhalgren Dhalgren Dhalgren" over and over again. The ability of texts to become circular is something that Delany explores in other works, such as Empire Star.

Delany conceived and executed Dhalgren as a literary multistable perception—the observer (reader) may choose to shift his perception back and forth. Central to this construction is the notebook itself: Kidd receives the notebook shortly after entering Bellona. In the first several chapters of the novel we see, on several occasions, exactly what Kid reads when he looks at the open notebook. The notebook appears to take over as the main text of the novel starting at Chapter VII, coming almost seamlessly after Chapter VI. However, though Chapter VII reads as though it is written by Kid, many of the passages shown in earlier chapters appear verbatim in Chapter VII. Yet for Kid to have read those passages earlier, the passages must have been written before he received the notebook. In fact, the last few pages of the novel show Kid leaving Bellona. The last sentence of that departure sequence is the incomplete one that conceivably loops back to the beginning of the book. However, earlier in the novel the notebook falls to the ground and Kid reads the last page. The reader sees exactly what Kid reads: the last four sentences of the novel, word for word. This happens well before a point in the novel where Kid specifically states that he only wrote the poems, and "all that other stuff" was already in there when he received the notebook. However, those four sentences are part of a longer section at the end of the novel which, when read, was obviously written by Kid. This means he left Bellona—taking the notebook with him, for how else would he be able to write about his departure—prior to that notebook being found inside Bellona and given to him. Delany has specifically stated that it is not a matter of settling or deciding which text is authoritative. It is more a matter of allowing the reader to experience perceptual shifts in the same way that a Necker cube can be viewed. Akin to the hints regarding its circular nature, Dhalgren also contains at least one hint towards the perceptual shifts: Denny's book of M. C. Escher prints. Additionally, Jeffrey Allen Tucker has written that Delany's unpublished notes regarding the writing of Dhalgren contain direct references to the novel itself working as a Möbius Strip, and makes a direct connection to Escher's "Möbius Strip".

Within the looping text that comprises Dhalgren, many other textual plays on perception can be found. Imagery and conversations, some hundreds of pages apart, closely echo each other. One case in point: The scenes on the bridge mentioned in the "Plot Summary" above. In another, light sliding across the face of a trucker driving at night is echoed in the description of light sliding across the face of a building. The repeated motif of a scratch down the lower leg of several female characters at different points in the novel is yet another example.

=== Delany's personal experience of reality ===
Samuel R. Delany has dyslexia and dysmetria. He once spent time in the mental health ward of a hospital. and he has repeatedly spoken and written of seeing burned-out sections of great American cities that most people didn't see, or even know existed. Dhalgren is a literary exposition of all these experiences for the "normal" reader.

=== Influences ===
Dhalgren is often compared to James Joyce's Ulysses. Delany has cited poets W. H. Auden, Rainer Maria Rilke, and Paul Valéry as influences on the book, as well as John Ashbery's poem "The Instruction Manual". Elsewhere he cites Michel Foucault, Frank Kermode, and Jack Spicer. Kenneth R. James has elaborated subtextual ties to mathematician G. Spencer-Brown's Laws of Form.

== Literary significance and criticism ==
Cover of Vintage edition.

With over a million sales, Dhalgren is by far Delany's most popular book—and also his most controversial. Critical reaction to Dhalgren has ranged from high praise (both inside and outside the science fiction community) to extreme dislike (mostly within the community). However, Dhalgren was a commercial success, selling a half million copies in the first two years, and over a million copies worldwide since then, with "its appeal reaching beyond the usual SF readership."

William Gibson has referred to Dhalgren as "a riddle that was never meant to be solved."

Darrell Schweitzer expressed the opinion, "Dhalgren is, I think, the most disappointing thing to happen to science fiction since Robert Heinlein made a complete fool of himself with I Will Fear No Evil."

In 2015, Elizabeth Hand characterized the novel as "a dense, transgressive, hallucinatory, Joycean tour-de-force". Theodore Sturgeon called it "the very best ever to come out of the science fiction field". By contrast, Harlan Ellison hated the novel. When the book appeared, Ellison wrote: "I must be honest. I gave up after 361 pages. I could not permit myself to be gulled or bored any further."

Delany has speculated that "a good number of Dhalgren's more incensed readers, the ones bewildered or angered by the book, simply cannot read the proper distinction between sex and society and the nature and direction of the causal arrows between them, a vision of which lies just below the novel's surface."

Bellona, Destroyer of Cities, a stage adaptation of (or sequel to) Dhalgren, was produced at The Kitchen in New York City in April 2010, directed by Jay Scheib with videography from Carrie Mae Weems. In 2017, a multimedia performance called Dhalgren Sunrise was staged by Fort Point Theatre Channel in Chelsea, Massachusetts.

In 2023, scholar Rob Turner highlights Dhalgren as being an important example of postmodern metafiction, calling it "the most ambitious (and expansive) mecafictional experiment of its age."

== Publishing history ==
Dhalgren was officially published in January, 1975 (with copies available on bookshelves as early as the first week in December, 1974), as a paperback original (a Frederik Pohl selection) by Bantam Books. The Bantam edition went through 19 printings, selling slightly more than a million copies.

A hardcover edition was published by Gregg Press (1977), based on the Bantam paperback edition with many errors corrected, and with an introduction by Jean Mark Gawron. After the Bantam edition went out of print the book was republished by Grafton (1992); Wesleyan University Press/University Press of New England (1996); and Vintage Books, an imprint of Random House (2001), the latter two with an introduction by William Gibson. In 2010 Gollancz brought out an edition as part of its SF Masterworks series, and in 2014 an ebook edition of the novel appeared.

- 1975, USA, Bantam Books (ISBN 0-552-68554-2), Pub date January 1975, paperback (First edition)
- 1977, USA, Gregg Press (ISBN 0-8398-2396-7), Pub date June 1977, hardcover
- 1982, USA, Bantam Books (ISBN 0-553-25391-3), Pub date December 1982, paperback
- 1992, UK, Grafton Press (ISBN 0-586-21419-4), Pub date 1992, paperback
- 1996, USA, Wesleyan University Press (University Press of New England) (ISBN 0-8195-6299-8), Pub date 1996, paperback and limited edition slip-case hardcover edition of 300 signed and numbered copies.
- 2001, USA, Vintage Books (ISBN ), Pub date 15 May 2001, paperback
- 2002, USA, Vintage Books (ISBN 0-375-70668-2), Pub date 1 February 2002, paperback
- 2010, UK, Gollancz/Orion (978-0-575-09099-6), Masterworks of SF II Series, trade paperback
- 2014, USA, Open Road Media (978-1-4804-6178-9), ebook

== Sources ==
- Samuel R. Delany, "About Five Thousand Seven Hundred and Fifty Words" in The Jewel-Hinged Jaw, Berkeley Books, New York: 1977
- Robert Elliot Fox, "'This You-Shaped Hole of Insight and Fire': Meditations on Delany's Dhalgren" in Ash of Stars; On the Writings of Samuel R. Delany, edited by James Sallis, University of Mississippi Press, Jackson: 1996 ISBN 978-0-87805-852-5
- Jean Mark Gawron, "'On Dhalgren'" in Ash of Stars; On the Writings of Samuel R. Delany, edited by James Sallis, University of Mississippi Press, Jackson: 1996 ISBN 978-0-87805-852-5
- Bill Wood (editor), On Dhalgren, Fantastic Books, New York: 2021 ISBN 978-1-5154-4772-6
