= Dark Benediction =

"Dark Benediction" is a science fiction novella by American Walter M. Miller, first published in 1951.

== Plot ==
The story is set about two years after the collapse of civilization due to a mysterious disease called neuroderm. The "disease" is actually caused by a symbiotic micro-organism sent to Earth from another inhabited planet, and is actually beneficial, though seen as disfiguring because of the graying of skin which eventually spreads over the entire body.

The story's protagonist, Paul Harris Oberlin, begins the story outside Houston. He has managed to avoid infection so far, but is tiring of a diet of small game and ditch water. Paul has decided to risk exploring a city, figuring that the large, crowded cities are now deserted and, perhaps, offer better opportunities for scavenging.

Paul discovers that Houston is now controlled by a strongman named Georgelle, whose followers exterminate any "dermies" they come across. Unable to stomach the murder of a dermie girl, Paul rescues her and flees Houston.

The girl, Willow or "Willie", was heading for Galveston, familiar to her from visits before the collapse. She has heard that nuns have set themselves up there. Paul takes her to Galveston, hoping to find medical help for her crippling gunshot wound.

Paul finds that Galveston Island is an all-dermie colony which had deliberately destroyed all bridges leading from the mainland. There are nuns, and monks, and they provide the leadership for the colony. There is also a scientist who has survived the chaos, and who confirms for Paul the rumors that neuroderm has an extraterrestrial origin.

Eventually, Paul overcomes his fears about neuroderm for the sake of Willie, and plans to go with her to some small island until sanity returns to the world. However, the implied threat of Georgelle's people remains, the dermies of Galveston providing a doubly attractive target for their planned expansion: extermination of the dermies, plus a treasure trove of loot, including gasoline and working cars and trucks.

Much of the story takes place at St. Mary's Hospital in Galveston, a real hospital which was run by a real order of nuns. The hospital is now part of the University of Texas Medical Branch (UTMB). The address is 404 8th St.

== Sources ==
- Miller, Walter M. Jr. (April 2007). Dark Benediction. S.F. Masterworks. United Kingdom: Gollancz. ISBN 978-0-313-27651-4.
