= The Second Trip =

1972 novel by Robert Silverberg

- Cover of first edition (hardcover)
- Author: Robert Silverberg
- Cover artist: Gene Szafran
- Language: English
- Genre: Science fiction
- Publisher: Doubleday
- Publication date: 1972
- Publication place: United States
- Media type: Print (hardback & paperback)
- Pages: 192

The Second Trip is a 1972 science fiction novel by American writer Robert Silverberg. Prior to its publication by Doubleday, it was published in serialized form in Amazing Stories from July to September 1971.

== Plot introduction ==
The novel is set in the year 2011; about forty years from the time it was written. Because capital punishment has been deemed too harsh, violent criminals are subjected to coercive therapy that effectively erases their personalities, which are replaced with artificially constructed memories to form a character deemed useful to society.

The protagonist is Paul Macy, a rehabilitated criminal who finds his original personality, a serial rapist named Nat Hamlin, reasserting itself in defiance of the conditioning.

The novel includes several graphic scenes of copulation and sexual assault, and long stretches of the narrative consist of interior dialogues between Macy and Hamlin loaded with blunt and obscene language. These qualities, which placed The Second Trip squarely within the New Wave subgenre, were quite controversial when the novel was serialized in Amazing Science Fiction, and then-editor Ted White carried on lengthy debates with offended readers in the "Or So You Say" letters section.

== Plot summary ==
Paul Macy, freshly released from therapy, is walking the streets of New York City when he encounters a woman who addresses him as Nat, the serial rapist whose body Paul now inhabits. The woman, Lisa, realizes her mistake, but the encounter has a strange effect on Paul, and he finds himself hallucinating memories from Nat Hamlin's life.

At first, Paul does his best to ignore his past, and begin anew as a holovision newscaster. But slowly, his condition worsens. More visions strike him when he comes into contact with Lisa and sculptures made by Hamlin, who was a celebrated artist before committing the series of rapes that led to erasure of his personality. Paul attempts to discuss his problem with Dr. Gomez at the Rehab Center. However, Gomez (using EEG scans) is convinced that Paul's problem is not real, and is instead just a cry for attention.

While at work, Lisa sends Paul messages, urging him to rekindle their relationship. Against his better judgment, Paul agrees to have dinner with Lisa at a People's Restaurant. While they eat, Nat Hamlin is found hiding within Paul's mind, and later becomes a lucid voice demanding control of his old body and memories. The two begin fighting for control of the body, and Lisa's affection. When his condition worsens, Paul tries to visit the Rehab center again, only to find that Hamlin can now cause him physical pain by stopping his heart. Under the threat of pain and possible death, Paul must now work alone with Lisa to eradicate Hamlin.

Lisa also has problems of her own. She is destitute and psychologically scarred by her love affair with Hamlin before he was caught and convicted. She has limited ESP, and can read Paul's mind to some degree. Seeing that there really are two personalities within Paul, she feels pity and decides to help get rid of Hamlin permanently.

Having become lovers, Lisa and Paul visit a Museum to see the Antigone 21, a lifelike psychosculpture of Lisa. While looking in awe at the sculpture, Paul allows Nat Hamlin to surface. The two argue (within Paul's head) about which personality has more right to exist. Nat declares that Paul is a fictitious construct, and does not deserve to live having been made up by the doctors at the Rehab Center. Paul counters by using the logic of the court, which found Nat guilty and deserving of his punishment. The two can not agree. Hamlin quietly goes away, while Paul gains newfound confidence to control and hopefully destroy Hamlin.

Over the next few days, Paul and Nat spar mentally. However, Paul discovers a growing desire to know more about his past. Specifically, he wants the memories of the body he now inhabits. This desire becomes a bargaining chip for Nat, who offers to share his memories if Paul will allow him to control the body from time to time. A bargain is agreed upon, but Lisa comes home and uses ESP to force Nat into hiding.

Dr. Gomez shows up at work and attempts to help Paul, but there is no easy way to do that since Paul fears being killed if he visits the Rehab Center. Gomez agrees to have Paul watched, because he is potentially a threat to society, and the first proof that Rehab deconstruction is not 100% effective. Until a solution can be found, Gomez warns Paul to stay away from Lisa. Both he and Paul agree that her ESP is responsible for Nat's return. Gomez also agrees to help Lisa, after Paul urges him to cure her as well.

Ignoring Gomez, Paul continues his relation with Lisa, only to find her missing one day. While searching Lisa's old apartment building, Paul gets mugged. After the altercation, he wakes up and realizes that Nat has taken over. Once Nat is in control, he (Nat) immediately returns to his old art dealer, Mr. Gargan, and agrees to have Nat's work sold under Paul's name. Their old contract is legally not binding since Nat was destroyed by Rehab. Meanwhile, Paul capitalizes on his access to Hamlin's memories by harassing Hamlin in turn, dredging up the details of the numerous rapes he committed and ridiculing the idea that Hamlin's artistic talent redeems his past brutality.

With Nat still in control, they visit Nat's old home. Though the mansion has new owners, Nat is allowed to see his old art studio only to find that he has lost his artistic talent. Angry, Nat leaves after getting his ex-wife's home address. They (Nat and Paul) drive to see Hamlin's ex-wife. Though she is afraid of him, she allows Hamlin into her home. Hamlin's stream of nostalgic reminiscences quickly turns sexual and predatory, culminating in an attempted rape that allows Paul to regain control of his body. Paul apologizes and returns to his apartment in New York, only to find that Lisa is gone.

Paul finds Lisa in a community hostel just above the People's Restaurant where they first shared a meal. Lisa lays naked in bed, somewhat catatonic. While trying to convince Lisa to return home with him, Paul merges his identity with Nat. They fight for control of the body (inside Paul's head). Nat is finally vanquished when Lisa appears, and uses her ESP abilities to strike Nat down with mental lightning.

== Characters ==
- Paul Macy - Protagonist and reformed version of criminal Nat Hamlin. Works as newscaster in New York. Paul, despite being a construct, does have his own memory of a past life and implanted knowledge of the world and knowledge to help him in his new job. However, his memory are rather generic and many things do not come naturally to him, such as the location of well known buildings and certain commons sayings take him a while to remember at first. He develops a stronger sense of will and independence due to his antagonistic relationship with Hamlin.
- Nathanial James Hamlin - Story's antagonist who is both a famous psychosculptor, and deranged rapist. After he re-awakens within Paul Macy, he begins fighting for control of his body.
- Lisa Moore - A talented art student who became Nat's old girlfriend, model, and victim. She loved Nat at one point, and tries to rekindle their relation with Paul after they meet by accident.

== Concepts ==
- Holovision - A form of three-dimensional television. Other than that, it seems to work on the standard principles television and marketing envisioned in the 1970s.
- Hovereye Cameras - Floating cameras that are dispersed around the globe at locations likely to be newsworthy. The Hovereyes float free-ranging, about 100 feet off the ground and can be commanded to zoom in and monitor locations and assist gathering visual and audio fees used by the media.
- Liftshaft - A replacement for elevators. Users step into a tube like structure, and rise in some fashion to their target floor.
- Psychoscuplture - A dynamic form of sculpture, that uses robotics, sonic sound generators, special lighting, and ionized gas. The premise is that sculpture will no longer be a static form of art. Instead, evoking different impressions and emotions via manipulation of the sculpture (a form of artistic robot), and other elements.
- Telepathy - As is often the case in Silverberg's work (e.g., Dying Inside, The Man in the Maze) the ability to read minds is more of a curse than a gift. For Lisa, mild ESP only heightens her helplessness and vulnerability. "There's a man over at that table who wants to rape me," she casually informs Paul during a restaurant meal. "He wishes he dared. I'm all naked and bloody in his mind, arms and legs tied to the furniture."

== See also ==
- Sex and sexuality in speculative fiction
- The Transformation of Sexuality within Science Fiction
