= Orb Books =

American science fiction and fantasy publishing imprint

- Industry: Publishing
- Headquarters: New York, New York, United States

Orb Books is a publishing imprint of Tor Books. Orb Books specialises in trade paperback reprints of science fiction and fantasy works of special merit that are otherwise unavailable in mass-market paperback.

== Authors published by Orb ==
- Poul Anderson
- Isaac Asimov
- Steven Brust
- Orson Scott Card
- Jonathan Carroll
- Storm Constantine
- Charles de Lint
- Lisa Goldstein
- Robert A. Heinlein
- Robert Holdstock
- Robert Jordan
- Gwyneth Jones
- Ursula K. Le Guin
- Fritz Leiber
- Maureen F. McHugh
- Kenneth Morris
- Pat Murphy
- Robert Silverberg
- Kim Stanley Robinson
- L. Neil Smith
- Judith Tarr
- James Tiptree, Jr.
- A. E. Van Vogt
- Jack Vance
- James White
- Jack Williamson
- Gene Wolfe
- Chelsea Quinn Yarbro
