= The Book of Skulls =

1972 novel by Robert Silverberg

- Cover of first edition (hardcover)
- Author: Robert Silverberg
- Cover artist: Robert Aulicino
- Language: English
- Genre: Science fiction
- Publisher: Charles Scribner's Sons
- Publication date: 1972
- Publication place: United States
- Media type: Print (Hardcover & Paperback)
- Pages: 222
- ISBN: 0-684-12590-0
- OCLC: 240381
- Dewey Decimal: 813/.5/4
- LC Class: PZ4.S573 Bo PS3569.I472

The Book of Skulls is a science fiction novel by American writer Robert Silverberg, first published in 1972. It was nominated for the Nebula Award in 1972, and both the Hugo and Locus Awards in 1973.

== Synopsis ==
The plot concerns four college students who discover a Catalan manuscript, The Book of Skulls, dealing with an order of monks living in a monastery in the Arizona desert, whose members allegedly have the power to bestow immortality on those who complete their initiation rite. Most frightening among the order's mysteries is the ninth: for each group of four initiates, only two will become immortal—one will sacrifice himself, and one will be sacrificed by the others. The boys travel across America to the monastery, where they are accepted collectively as a "Receptacle" and told that, once accepted, if any one of them were to leave the three others' lives would be forfeit.

The narrative switches back and forth between the viewpoints of the four young men as each confronts his personal demons on the way to completing the ritual. Timothy, star athlete and blue-blooded son of a wealthy family, quickly grows bored with the austere monastic life. Ned, an openly gay poet, finds himself fascinated by the philosophical contrast between eternity and extinction. Eli, the gifted but awkward young Jewish student who discovered the manuscript, questions the surety of the mundane vs faith in the extraordinary. Oliver, the handsome midwestern farmboy, works himself harder than ever out of a powerful lust for life that even he himself doesn't fully understand. Each of them harbors secrets that will come back to haunt them.

The monks' teachings include a history of immortality, alluding to prehistoric shamans and advanced Atlantean scholars. One of the monks puts the four through a trial of confession: each student must privately confess his darkest moment to one of the others. Ned confesses to Timothy about his gleeful role in a gay double affair, leading to a double suicide. Timothy confesses to Oliver about social belittlement and rejection leading to him drunkenly raping his sister. Oliver confesses to Eli about the day he was seduced into a homosexual encounter as a teenager. Eli breaks confidentiality and tells Ned about Oliver's confession, then attempts to use that as his darkest moment — a convenient "ad-hoc" sin. Ned rejects Eli's confession, forcing Eli to give up his real guilt: his entire academic career is based on plagiarism, the brilliant but uncredited manuscript of a dead colleague.

As the sun rises, a disgusted Timothy attempts one last time to convince Eli to leave before walking away himself, heading for Phoenix. Eli, knowing the consequences and feeling the time is at hand for one of them to be sacrificed, bashes Timothy's head in with a carved stone skull. Shortly thereafter Oliver, who is unable to face the truth about his sexuality after an attempted seduction by Ned, castrates and kills himself by many self-inflicted knife wounds. With one initiate dead by murder and one by suicide, the monks declare the ninth mystery fulfilled and welcome the remaining two into eternal life.

== Reception ==
Baird Searles found the novel well-crafted but unsatisfying, saying of the viewpoint characters that "none [were] particularly likeable, interesting, or convincing."

James Blish, despite finding the novel a "noble failure," described it as "so unobtrusively, flawlessly written that even at its most puzzling it comes as perilously close to poetic beauty as any of the contemporary novels I've ever read."

== Film adaptation ==
In 2003, Paramount Pictures optioned the film rights, with William Friedkin to direct and Jeff Davis adapting. No further development were made.

The cover of the 2006 paperback edition stated that the novel is "Soon to be made into a major motion picture". While there has been speculation on various film-related websites, plans for production failed to materialize.
