= Downward to the Earth =

1970 science fiction novel by Robert Silverberg

- Cover of the first edition
- Author: Robert Silverberg
- Cover artist: Frank Frazetta
- Language: English
- Genre: Science fiction
- Publisher: Doubleday
- Publication date: 1970
- Publication place: United States
- Media type: Print (Hardcover & Paperback)
- Pages: 180
- ISBN: 978-0-451-04497-6

Downward to the Earth is a 1970 science fiction novel by American writer Robert Silverberg. It is a tale of the quest for transcendence (a frequent Silverberg theme) set on another planet, and includes references to Heart of Darkness, Joseph Conrad's classic tale of colonialism, including the name of Kurtz. Its title references Ecclesiastes 3:21 in the Bible ("Who knows if the spirit of people rises upward and the spirit of animals goes downward to the earth?").

Downward to the Earth was originally published as a four-part serial publication, starting in the November 1969 edition of Galaxy Science Fiction. It was nominated for a Locus Award in 1971.

== Plot summary ==
Edmund Gunderson was the Terran administrator of the colony world of Belzagor, and he returns to it after it has gained independence, feeling a sense of guilt for the way he has treated its dominant species, the elephant-like Nildoror, whose animalistic appearance had kept Gunderson from taking them seriously as sentient beings. On his return, he feels a new sense of kinship with the natives, perhaps more than for the Terran tourists. The Nildoror undergo a process of rebirth, and Gunderson's greatest guilt comes from having denied rebirth to seven Nildoror to make them help him repair flood damage. He encounters his old colleague Jeff Kurtz (an addict of Naggiar venom), who had undergone the rebirth ceremony only to be turned into something monstrous. Nevertheless, Gunderson dares to subject himself to the rebirth ceremony, which brings him a new understanding of the native creatures and new powers by which he can heal Kurtz and impart his new-found knowledge to others.
