= David Pringle =

Scottish science fiction editor

- Born: 1 March 1950 (age 76); Selkirk, Scotland
- Occupation: Editor
- Writing career
- Period: 1979–present
- Genres: Science fiction, horror
- Notable work: Interzone

David Pringle (born 1 March 1950) is a Scottish science fiction editor and critic.

Pringle served as the editor of Foundation, an academic journal, from 1980 to 1986, during which time he became one of the prime movers of the collective which founded Interzone in 1982. By 1988, he was the sole publisher and editor of Interzone, a position he retained until he sold the magazine to Andy Cox in 2004. For 2 1/2 years, from 1991 to 1993, he also edited and published a magazine entitled Million: The Magazine About Popular Fiction.

Interzone was nominated several times for the Hugo Award for best semiprozine, winning in 1995. In 2005, the Worldcon committee gave Pringle a Special Award for his work on Interzone.

Pringle is a scholar of J. G. Ballard. He wrote the first short monograph on Ballard, Earth is the Alien Planet: J. G. Ballard's Four-Dimensional Nightmare (Borgo Press, 1979) and compiled J. G. Ballard: A Primary and Secondary Bibliography (G. K. Hall, 1984). He also published a newsletter, first titled News From The Sun then JGB News, from 1981 until 1996.

He worked as a series editor for Games Workshop, in 1988–1991, commissioning shared world novels and short stories based on their Warhammer and Dark Future games.

Pringle has written several guides to science fiction, including Science Fiction: The 100 Best Novels, The Ultimate Guide to Science Fiction, and Modern Fantasy: The 100 Best Novels. His books are less American-oriented and more British-oriented than many similar works. He has also edited two large reference books, St James Guide to Fantasy Writers and St James Guide to Horror, Ghost and Gothic Writers; plus a number of anthologies and illustrated coffee-table books about genre writing.
