= The Centauri Device =

1974 novel by M. John Harrison

- Cover of the first edition
- Author: M. John Harrison
- Cover artist: Anita Siegal
- Language: English
- Genre: Science fiction
- Publisher: Doubleday
- Publication date: November 1974
- Publication place: United Kingdom
- Media type: Print (Hardcover and Paperback)
- Pages: 185
- ISBN: 0-385-01839-8
- OCLC: 979024
- LC Class: 73083635

The Centauri Device is the third novel by English author M. John Harrison. The novel, originally conceived as an "anti-space opera" would ultimately go on to make a major contribution to revitalising the subgenre and influencing the works of later authors such as Iain M. Banks and Alastair Reynolds.

== Outline ==
Harrison has said that the book breaks what were then the central tenets of space opera, namely that the protagonist plays an active role in driving the plot forward, that the universe is comprehensible to humans and that the universe is anthropocentric. These preconceptions were still common in the more literary space operas of the time, such as Samuel R. Delany's Nova (which Harrison described as "highly readable but finally unsatisfying") and, in terms of tone, Harrison's novel more closely hews to the unconventional genre-bending of Alfred Bester's The Stars My Destination and The Paradox Men by Charles L. Harness, with the bleak cosmic outlook being influenced by Barrington J. Bayley's The Star Virus.

The viewpoint character, John Truck, is a passive hero, a space captain in the year 2367 who ships drugs when he can find them and legitimate cargo when he cannot. The twentieth century is long forgotten and misremembered, with Leonid Brezhnev and Richard Nixon described as "lords" and Hermann Göring as an artist. The dyne-field connects planets and yet seems to merge them, the decayed industrial wasteland "Carter's Snort" in Britain merges with the slums of Junk City on Avernus. These worlds are stagnant, controlled by corrupt politics, organised crime and the bizarre "Opener" religion, who see "honesty of bodily function [as] the sole valid praise of God." These landscapes are Truck's natural home and a hiding place from General Alice Gaw of the Israeli World Government and Colonel Gaddafi ben Barka of the United Arab Socialist Republics. (True to the strong vein of anarchism in Harrison's work, neither of these political entities resemble their twentieth century counterparts.)

Truck is being hunted because of his ancestry, as he is half-Centauran (the rest of his race having been killed by human bombing some decades earlier) and the only person who can activate the newly unearthed Centauri Device. The UASR want the device as they believe it to be a useful propaganda tool, the Openers believe it to be God, the Aesthete Anarchists (an exuberant civilization of spacefarers who travel the void in spaceships named after works of art) do not know what it is but want to possess it anyway, while the World Government have correctly surmised that it is a bomb. As the Device is useless without Truck all four factions try to hunt him down. Unable to hide, he tries to fight but the forces are prepared to kill those around him. In his desperation, he takes the only step open to him and activates the devices, destroying himself, the Solar System and the Alpha Centauri system in a Hypernova.

The epilogue is designed to distance the reader from the text still further, reducing the events of the book to nothing more than "a dramatised account" and offering a variety of theories on the matter, mostly, it admits, based on nothing more than guesswork.

== Critical reception ==
The novel played a major role in the formation of the "New Space Opera" of the 1980s and 1990s, inspiring authors such as Iain Banks. In particular, Banks has commented that "M. John Harrison should be a megastar, but he probably couldn’t be because he’s too rarefied a taste" and in an Arena SF interview, he gave The Pastel City (part of the Viriconium sequence) as his favourite Harrison title. Alastair Reynolds has also been influenced by Harrison's work, including a reference to The Centauri Device in his essay "Future Histories", which later formed the afterword to the collection Galactic North. Ken MacLeod remembered reading it in 1975, originally thinking it would be a standard space adventure, before being inspired to seek out and ultimately write books in a similar vein. More generally, many motifs from the novel have become part of the scenery of modern space opera, in particular the excessively lengthy and baroque spaceship naming convention.

However, reviews from those preparing critical surveys of Harrison's work have been tepid, with both John Clute and Rhys Hughes naming it as his least successful novel, though with some high points. Perhaps the most significant detractor of the novel is Harrison himself who, in a 2001 interview with SF Site, described it as "the crappiest thing I ever wrote."

David Pringle assessed it as: "A stylish, dark-hued but tongue-in-cheek space opera, in which anarchist space pirates, with a taste for fin-de-siecle art, fly spacecraft with names like 'Driftwood of Decadence' and 'The Green Carnation'. Self-conscious and literary, but nevertheless a virtuoso performance."

== Links to other works ==
The novel has some connection to the Viriconium sequence through the enigmatic character Dr. Grishkin, who appears in The Centauri Device as the leader of the Opener cult and in the Viriconium story "Lamia Mutable", first published in Again, Dangerous Visions and again in The Machine in Shaft Ten. However, as this story has been delisted from all editions of Viriconium Nights (along with "Events Witnessed from a City" and the novella-length version of In Viriconium) since the first Ace Books edition, it can not be taken as "canon", if such a term could be said to apply to the famously mutable dying earth in which it is set.

An extract, under the title of 'The Wolf That Follows' was printed in the anthology New Worlds 7 with an illustration by Judith Clute. A novelette version appeared in the January 1974 edition of The Magazine of Fantasy & Science Fiction, under the title "The Centauri Device".
