= Viriconium (2000 collection) =

2000 novel collection by M. John Harrison

- Cover from the first edition
- Author: M. John Harrison
- Cover artist: Albert Godwin and Richard Carr
- Language: English
- Series: Viriconium
- Genre: Fantasy
- Publisher: Orion Books
- Publication date: 2000
- Publication place: United Kingdom
- Media type: Print (paperback)
- Pages: 562 pp
- ISBN: 1-85798-995-3
- OCLC: 43634907

Viriconium is an omnibus collection of the entire Viriconium sequence by M. John Harrison. It consists of the three novels, and all the short stories from the collection Viriconium Nights. It was published in 2000 by Orion Books as volume 7 of their Fantasy Masterworks series. Several of the stories first appeared in the magazines New Worlds and Interzone. The short stories appear here in a running order different from earlier publications of Viriconium Nights and it appears that the whole Viriconium sequence is here arranged by some internal chronology.

== Contents ==
- "Viriconium Knights"
- The Pastel City (novel)
- "The Lords of Misrule"
- "Strange Great Sins"
- A Storm of Wings (novel)
- "The Dancer from the Dance"
- "The Luck in the Head"
- "The Lamia and Lord Cromis"
- In Viriconium (novel)
- "A Young Man’s Journey to Viriconium"
