= Viriconium (1988 collection) =

1988 book collection by M. John Harrison

- Cover from the first edition
- Author: M. John Harrison
- Cover artist: Ian Miller
- Language: English
- Series: Viriconium
- Genre: Fantasy
- Publisher: Allen & Unwin
- Publication date: 1988
- Publication place: United Kingdom
- Media type: Print (paperback)
- Pages: 276 pp
- ISBN: 0-04-440245-7
- OCLC: 17838398
- Preceded by: A Storm of Wings

Viriconium is an omnibus collection of two books of the Viriconium series by M. John Harrison. It was published in 1988 by Allen & Unwin. The book contains the novel, In Viriconium and the full contents of the short story collection Viriconium Nights. Several of the stories first appeared in the magazines New Worlds and Interzone.

== Contents ==
- Introduction, by Iain Banks
- In Viriconium
- "The Luck in the Head"
- "The Lamia and Lord Cromis"
- "Strange Great Sins"
- "Viriconium Knights"
- "The Dancer from the Dance"
- "The Lords of Misrule"
- "A Young Man’s Journey to Viriconium"
