= Stellification =

Theoretical process in astronomy

Stellification is a theoretical process by which a brown dwarf star or Jovian-class planet is turned into a star, or by which the luminosity of dim stars is greatly magnified.

== Methods ==
=== Luminosity magnification ===
The fusion reaction of stars is strongly dependent upon temperature. For proton-proton reactions such as found in the Sun, the reaction rate scales with the fourth power of temperature (T^{4}). For other reactions such as the CNO cycle, the proportionality can be as high as T^{20}. Thus, increasing the temperature of the star even a small amount (for example by using reflective solar sails), would create a large increase in power output, resulting in a much higher equilibrium temperature, and therefore luminosity, of the star.

=== Black hole seeding ===
Brown dwarf stars and gas-giant planets do not achieve sustained fusion, as they contain insufficient mass to gravitationally compress the reactants to the degree required to initiate a reaction. If the density of the star or planet could be increased, fusion could be initiated. One such method is to "seed" the body with a black hole. Although the black hole would initially start swallowing the body, the huge output of radiation caused by this would resist the flow of further material. The rate of infall is bound by the Eddington limit, which shows that the luminosity of the resultant star (in Watts) would be equal to approximately six times its mass (in kilograms).

It has been suggested that a black hole could be moved into position by placing an asteroid in orbit around the black hole, and using a mass driver to direct a stream of matter into it. This could be used to move the black hole either via simple conservation of momentum, or by harnessing the power generated as a result. Zubrin (1999) suggests that a luminosity 1/10,000th that of our own sun would be required to create Earth-like temperatures on planets in close orbit to a brown dwarf, thus requiring a black hole with a mass of 6.1 × 10^21 kg (about 8% the mass of Earth's moon).

=== Thermonuclear ignition ===
It is well established that Jovian-class planets consist mostly of hydrogen and helium. It is theorised that concentrations of hydrogen and helium isotopes at certain depths of a gas-giant planet may be sufficient to support a fusion chain reaction, if sufficient energy can be delivered to ignite the reaction. If a gas giant has a layer with a large concentration of deuterium (>0.3%), ultra-high-speed (2×10^{7} m/s) collision of a sufficiently large asteroid (diameter > 100 m) could ignite a thermonuclear reaction.

== Examples in fiction ==
- In Arthur C. Clarke's 2010: Odyssey Two, an alien construct transforms the hydrogen of Jupiter's atmosphere directly into heavier elements, leading to a subsequent ignition of the planet.
- In The Saga of Seven Suns by Kevin J. Anderson, humanity uses alien technology to ignite a gas giant, inadvertently wiping out a race of gaseous aliens who dwelt within and thus initiating an interstellar war.
- In Star Maker by Olaf Stapledon, the eponymous "star maker" is depicted as a rational artist, akin to a god.
- In Light (novel) by M. John Harrison, one of the main characters Seria Mau Genlicher, ignites a gas giant during a space battle using special ordnance. The book is also replete with references to artificial suns and stars that do not fit into the main sequence.
- In Stargate SG-1, an alien race known as the Aschen Confederation ignited a gas giant into a star for farming purposes, and subsequently Jupiter in an alternate timeline of Earth.
- In Orion's Arm, stellified objects are fairly common and powered by various means. The most common methods are to seed the target object with a small black hole, a magnetic-monopole-based proton decay reactor, or self-replicating machines equipped with fusion-powered lamps.
- In the Halo universe, a large number of thermonuclear warheads were detonated within the atmosphere of the planet Viperidae, a gas giant roughly 13 times the mass of Jupiter, in order to trigger a temporary fusion reaction and destroy a large fleet of hostile alien spaceships.
