= Giant planet =

Planet much larger than the Earth

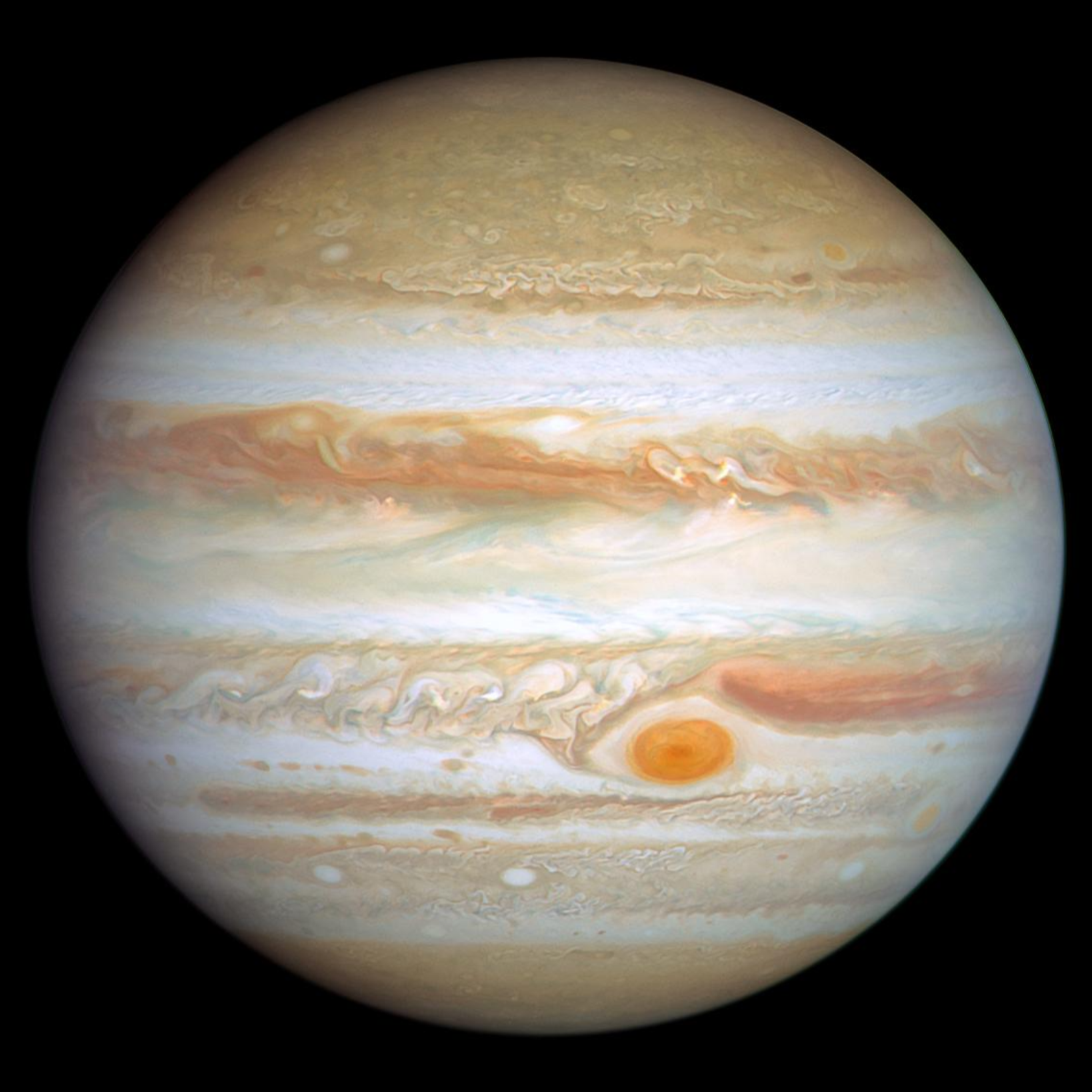
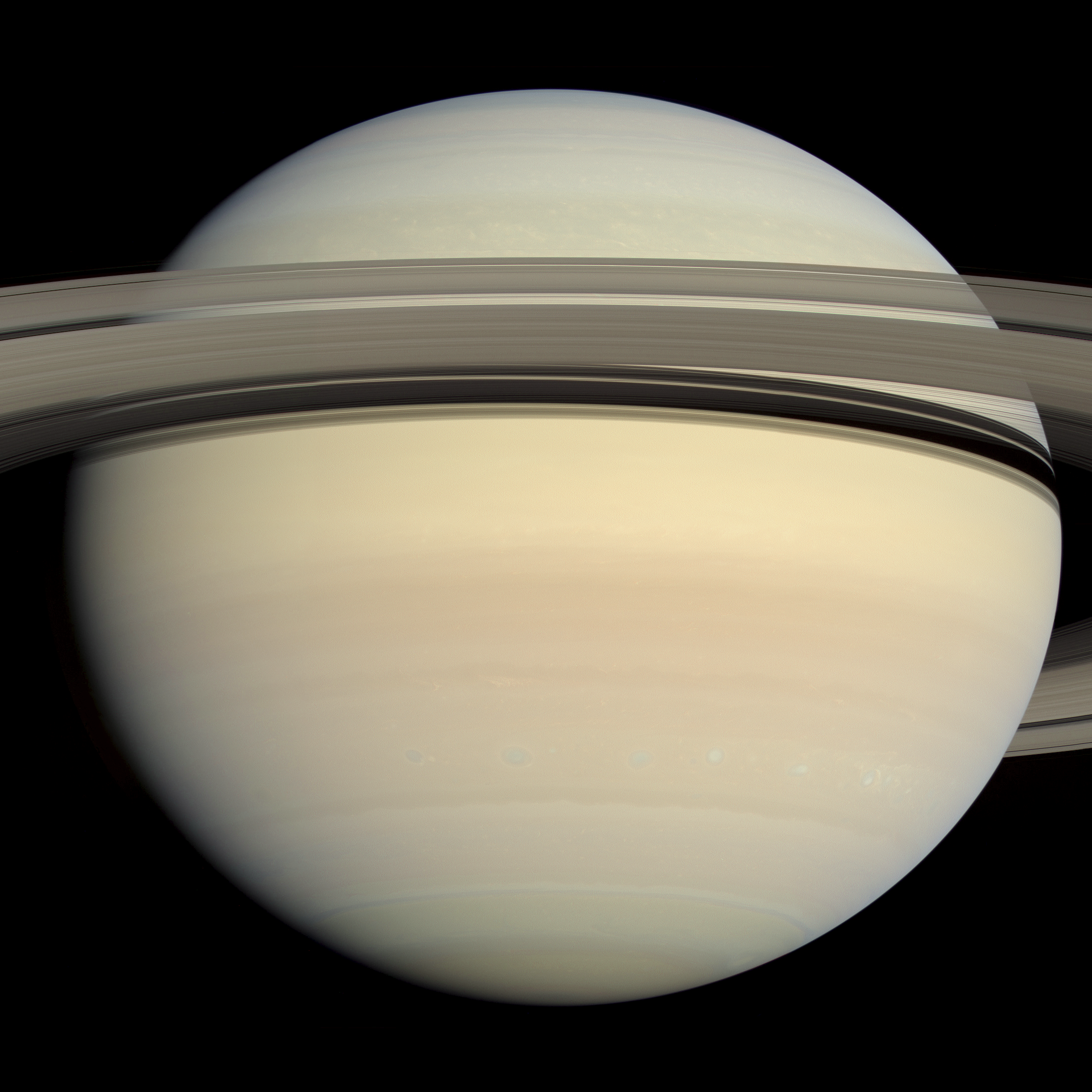
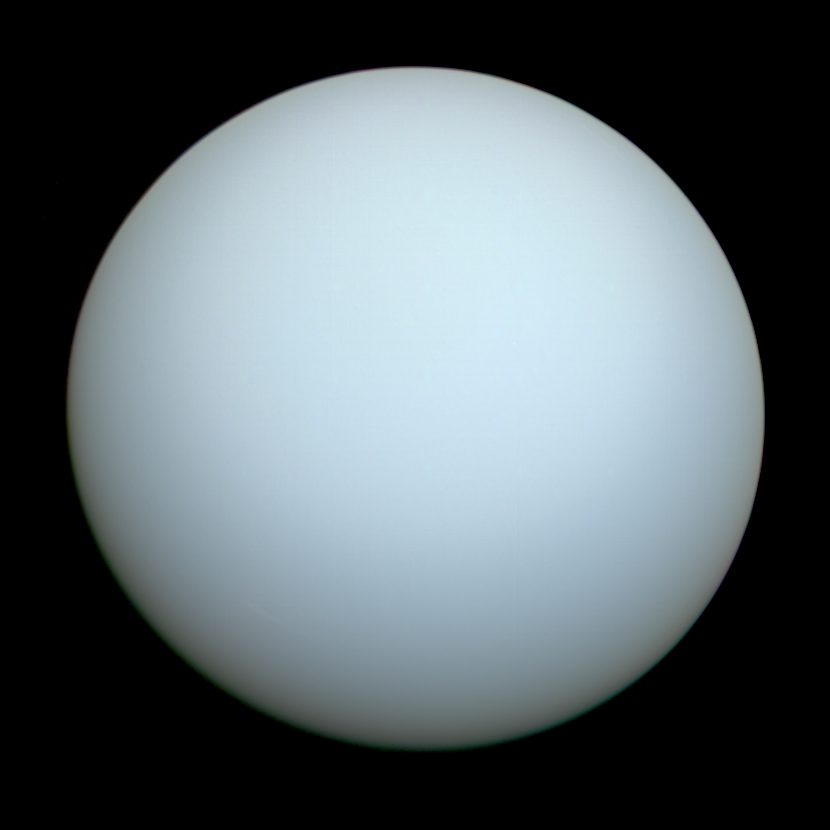
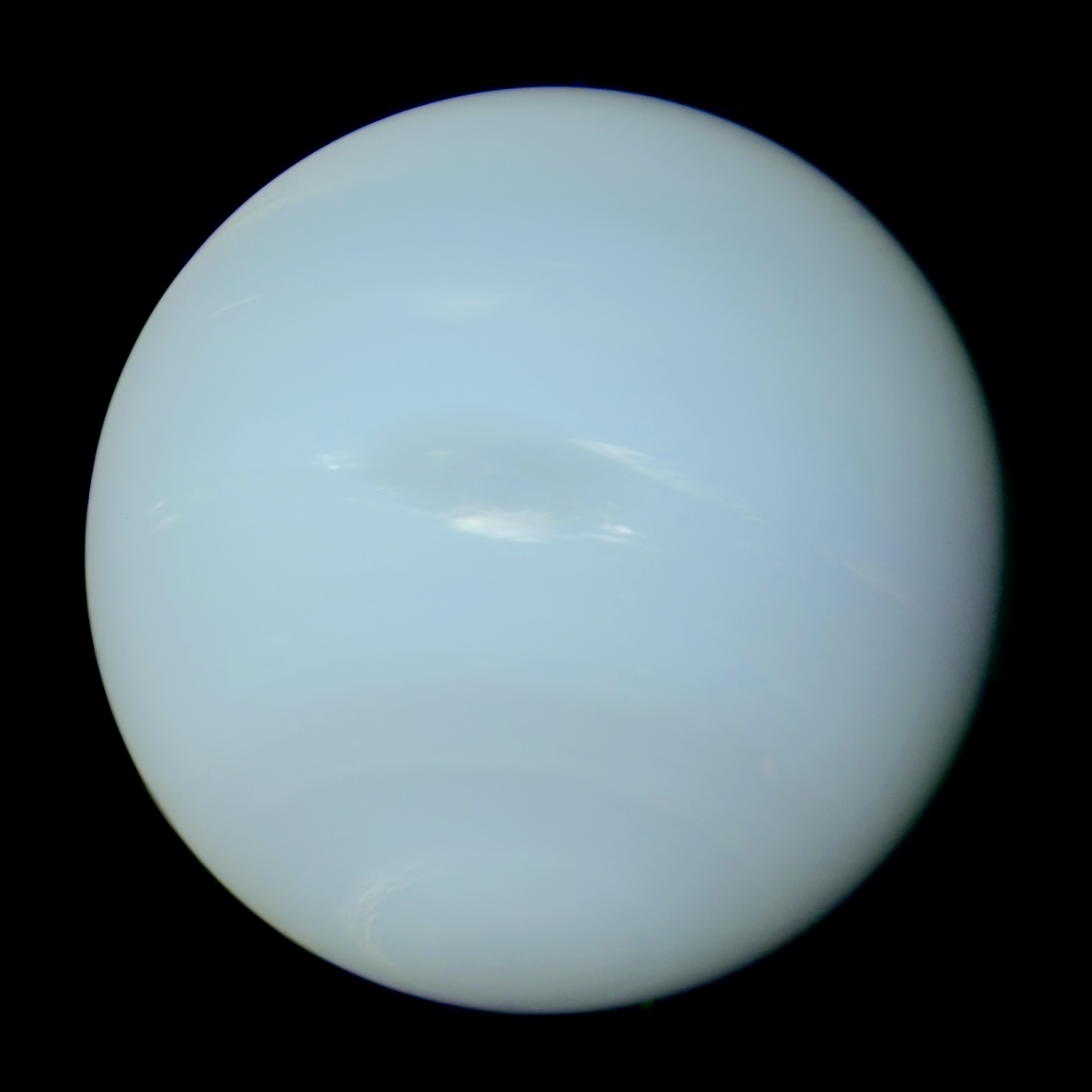
The four giant planets of the Solar System:
- (top) Jupiter and Saturn (gas giants)
- (bottom) Uranus and Neptune (ice giants)
Shown in order from the Sun and in true color. Sizes are not to scale.

A giant planet is a diverse type of planet much larger than Earth. It is sometimes referred to as a Jovian planet, with Jove being another name for the Roman god Jupiter. Giant planets are usually primarily composed of low-boiling point materials (volatiles), rather than rock or other solid matter, but mega-Earths do also exist. There are four such giant planets in the Solar System: Jupiter, Saturn, Uranus, and Neptune. Many extrasolar giant planets have been identified.

Giant planets are sometimes known as gas giants, but many astronomers now apply the term only to Jupiter and Saturn, classifying Uranus and Neptune, which have different compositions, as ice giants. Both names are potentially misleading; the Solar System's giant planets all consist primarily of fluids above their critical points, where distinct gas and liquid phases do not exist. Jupiter and Saturn are principally made of hydrogen and helium, whilst Uranus and Neptune consist of water, ammonia, and methane.

The defining differences between a very low-mass brown dwarf and a massive gas giant (~13 M_{J}) are debated. One school of thought is based on planetary formation; the other, on the physics of the interior of planets. Part of the debate concerns whether brown dwarfs must, by definition, have experienced nuclear fusion at some point in their history.

== Terminology ==
The term gas giant was coined in 1952 by science fiction writer James Blish and was originally used to refer to all giant planets. Arguably it is something of a misnomer, because throughout most of the volume of these planets the pressure is so high that matter is not in gaseous form. Other than the upper layers of the atmosphere, all matter is likely beyond the critical point, where there is no distinction between liquids and gases. Fluid planet would be a more accurate term. Jupiter also has metallic hydrogen near its center, but much of its volume is hydrogen, helium, and traces of other gases above their critical points. The observable atmospheres of all these planets (at less than a unit optical depth) are quite thin compared to their radii, only extending perhaps one percent of the way to the center. Thus, the observable parts are gaseous (in contrast to Mars and Earth, which have gaseous atmospheres through which the crust can be seen).

The rather misleading term has caught on because planetary scientists typically use rock, gas, and ice as shorthands for classes of elements and compounds commonly found as planetary constituents, irrespective of the matter's phase. In the outer Solar System, hydrogen and helium are referred to as gas; water, methane, and ammonia as ice; and silicates and metals as rock. When deep planetary interiors are considered, it may not be far off to say that, by ice astronomers mean oxygen and carbon, by rock they mean silicon, and by gas they mean hydrogen and helium. The many ways in which Uranus and Neptune differ from Jupiter and Saturn have led some to use the term only for planets similar to the latter two. With this terminology in mind, some astronomers have started referring to Uranus and Neptune as ice giants to indicate the predominance of the ices (in fluid form) in their interior composition.

The alternative term jovian planet refers to the Roman god Jupiter—the genitive form of which is Jovis, hence Jovian—and was intended to indicate that all of these planets were similar to Jupiter.

Objects large enough to start deuterium fusion (above 13 Jupiter masses for solar composition) are called brown dwarfs, and these occupy the mass range between that of large giant planets and the lowest-mass stars. The 13-Jupiter-mass (M_{J}) cutoff is a rule of thumb rather than something of precise physical significance. Larger objects will burn most of their deuterium and smaller ones will burn only a little, and the 13 M_{J} value is somewhere in between. The amount of deuterium burnt depends not only on the mass but also on the composition of the planet, especially on the amount of helium and deuterium present. The Extrasolar Planets Encyclopaedia includes objects up to 60 M_{J}, and the Exoplanet Data Explorer up to 24 M_{J}.

== Description ==
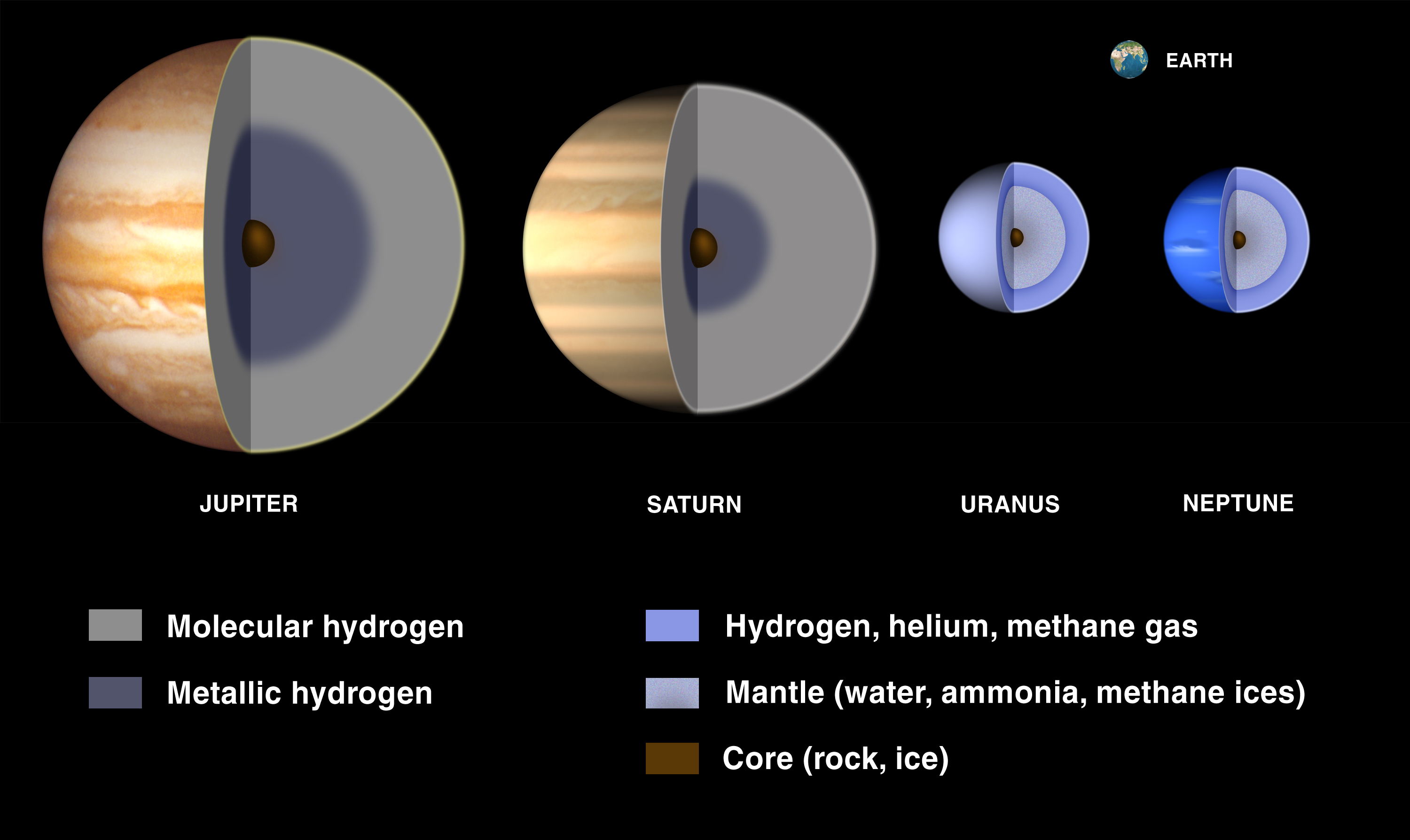
Cutaway illustrations of the interior of the giant planets. Jupiter is shown with a rocky core overlaid by a deep layer of metallic hydrogen.

A giant planet is a massive planet and has a thick atmosphere of hydrogen and helium. They may have a condensed "core" of heavier elements, delivered during the formation process. This core may be partially or completely dissolved and dispersed throughout the hydrogen/helium envelope. In "traditional" giant planets such as Jupiter and Saturn (the gas giants) hydrogen and helium make up most of the mass of the planet, whereas they only make up an outer envelope on Uranus and Neptune, which are instead mostly composed of water, ammonia, and methane and therefore increasingly referred to as "ice giants".

Extrasolar giant planets that orbit very close to their stars are the exoplanets that are easiest to detect. These are called hot Jupiters and hot Neptunes because they have very high surface temperatures. Hot Jupiters were, until the advent of space-borne telescopes, the most common form of exoplanet known, due to the relative ease of detecting them with ground-based instruments.

Giant planets are commonly said to lack solid surfaces, but it is more accurate to say that they lack surfaces altogether since the gases that form them simply become thinner and thinner with increasing distance from the planets' centers, eventually becoming indistinguishable from the interplanetary medium. Therefore, landing on a giant planet may or may not be possible, depending on the size and composition of its core.

== Subtypes ==
=== Gas giants ===
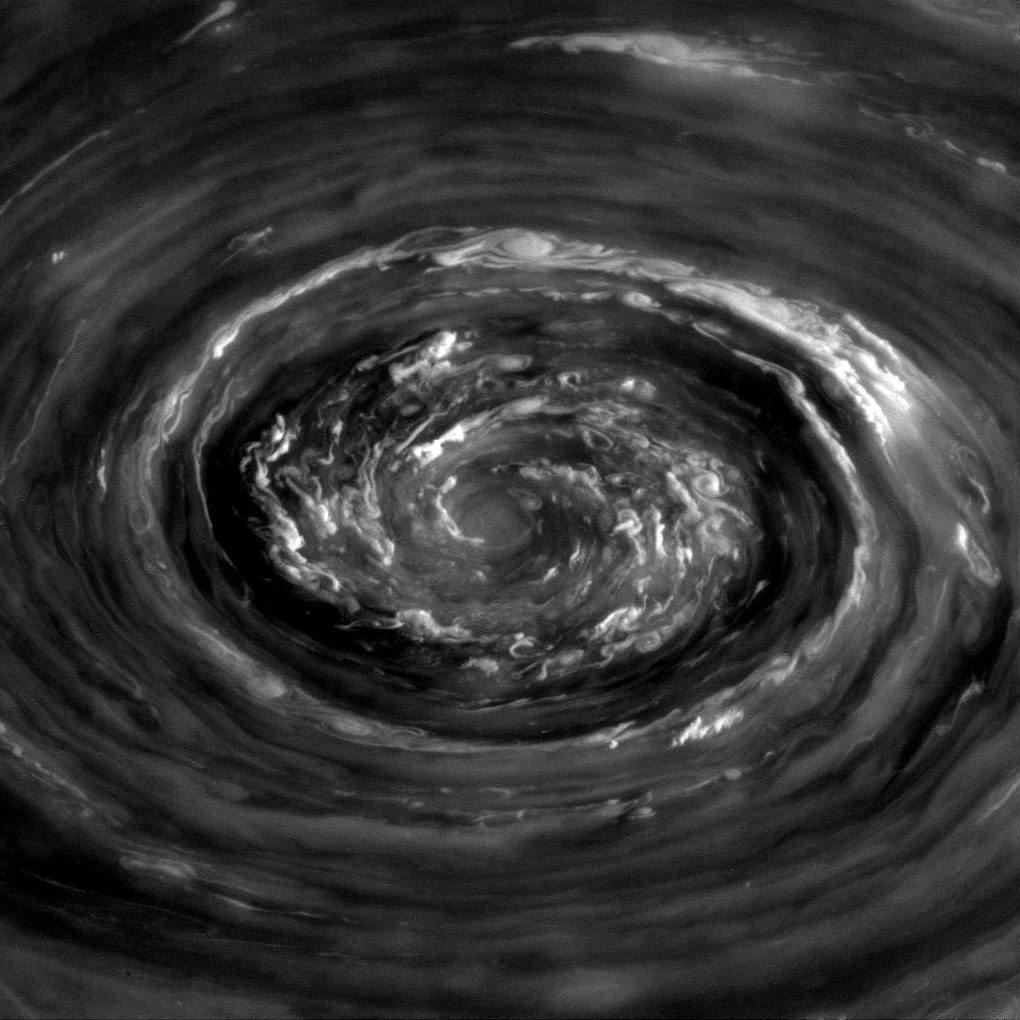
Saturn's north polar vortex

Gas giants consist mostly of hydrogen and helium. The Solar System's gas giants, Jupiter and Saturn, have heavier elements making up between 3 and 13 percent of their mass. Gas giants are thought to consist of an outer layer of molecular hydrogen, surrounding a layer of liquid metallic hydrogen, with a probable molten core with a rocky composition.

Jupiter and Saturn's outermost portion of the hydrogen atmosphere has many layers of visible clouds that are mostly composed of water and ammonia. The layer of metallic hydrogen makes up the bulk of each planet, and is referred to as "metallic" because the very high pressure turns hydrogen into an electrical conductor. The core is thought to consist of heavier elements at such high temperatures (20,000 K) and pressures that their properties are poorly understood.

=== Ice giants ===
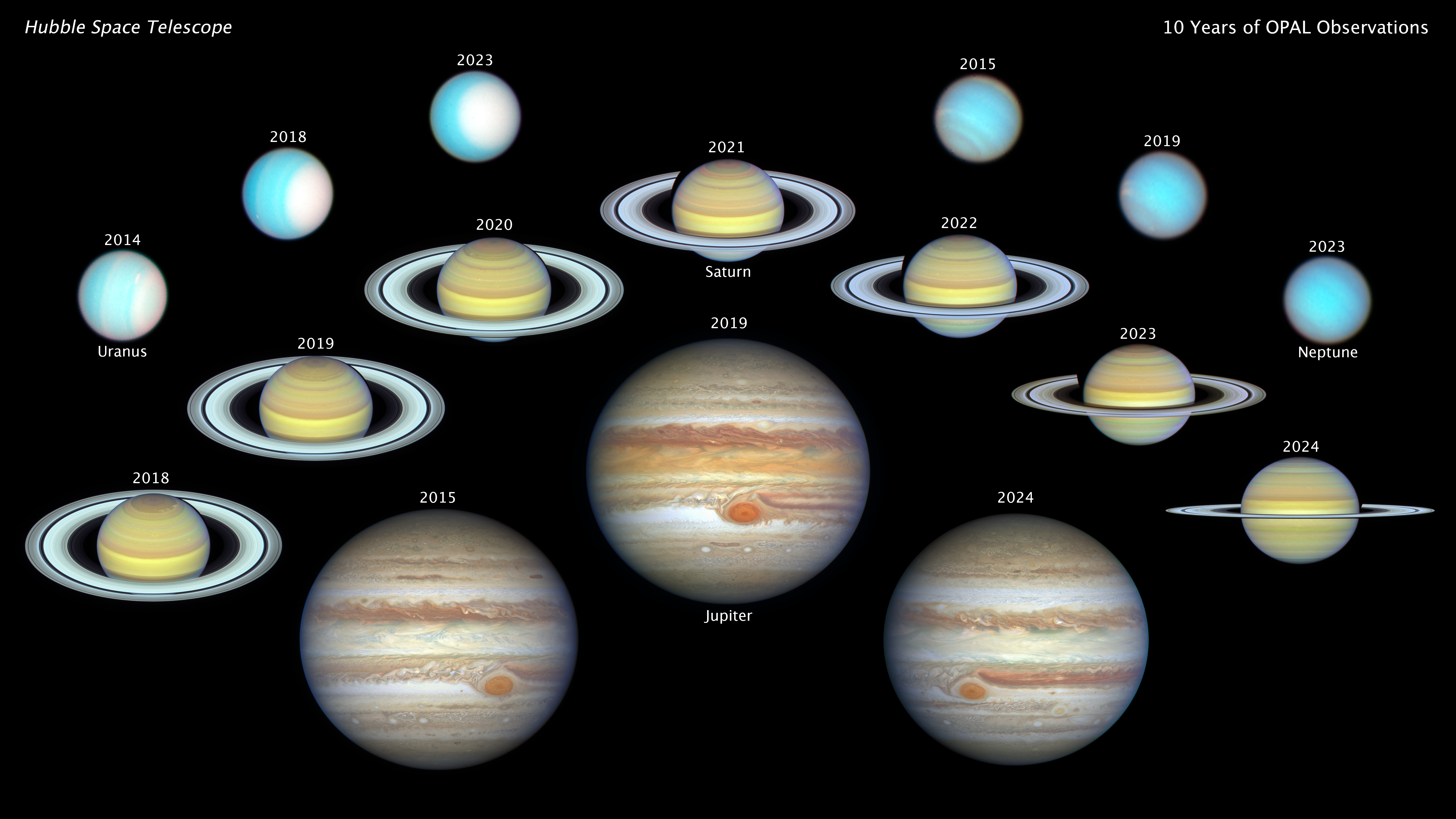
Composite image of Hubble photos showing four giant planets of the Solar System, tracking seasonal changes during ten years of observations (2014-2024)

Ice giants have distinctly different interior compositions from gas giants. The Solar System's ice giants, Uranus and Neptune, have a hydrogen-rich atmosphere that extends from the cloud tops down to about 80% (Uranus) or 85% (Neptune) of their radius. Below this, they are predominantly "icy", i.e. consisting mostly of water, methane, and ammonia. There is also some rock and gas, but various proportions of ice–rock–gas could mimic pure ice, so that the exact proportions are unknown.

Uranus and Neptune have very hazy atmospheric layers with small amounts of methane, giving them light aquamarine colors. Both have magnetic fields that are sharply inclined to their axes of rotation.

Unlike the other giant planets, Uranus has an extreme tilt that causes its seasons to be severely pronounced. The two planets also have other subtle but important differences. Uranus has more hydrogen and helium than Neptune despite being less massive overall. Neptune is therefore denser and has much more internal heat and a more active atmosphere. The Nice model, in fact, suggests that Neptune formed closer to the Sun than Uranus did, and should therefore have more heavy elements.

=== Mega-Earths ===
The term "mega-Earth" or "massive solid planet" has been used to refer to very massive terrestrial exoplanets, whose densities are considerably greater than that of Earth and gas giants. The term "mega-Earth" was coined in 2014, though it remained an informal category until a quantitative definition was proposed for it in 2026. Based on the measured radii and densities of known exoplanets as of March 2026, mega-Earths appear to be a distinct category of exoplanets that are between 2.1 and 5.0 Earth radii (R_{🜨}) and have densities higher than Earth's (5.5 g/cm^{3}).

Based on their observed high densities, mega-Earths are inferred to be largely made of solid material, such as rock, metal, and ice. If the mega-Earth is rich in volatiles like water, it may harbor a supercritical ocean under a thin atmosphere of hydrogen, helium, and other gases. The existence of mega-Earths challenges conventional theories for planetary formation, as massive planets should accrete large amounts of gas in addition to solid material from the host star's protoplanetary disk. It has been hypothesized that mega-Earths may either be remnant cores of evaporated gas giants or products of consecutive collisions between super-Earths.

Several pulsar planets, such as PSR J1719−1438 b, were discovered with masses higher than Jupiter's but with smaller radii when compared to gas giants, and are expected hence to be mostly crystallized diamond and oxygen. As such, they may be carbon-rich planet-sized remnant inner cores of former companion stars shredded during interaction with a pulsar. However, per definitions, they would be instead considered as very low-mass white dwarfs, rather than high-density diamond planets.

The possibility of massive solid planets up to thousands of M_{🜨} forming around massive stars (B and O-type stars; 5–120 M_{☉}) has also been suggested based on mass-radius relationships for rocky planets, proposing that the protoplanetary disk around such stars would contain enough heavy elements, and that high UV radiation and strong winds could photoevaporate the gas in the disk, leaving just the heavy elements. However, a more recent research showed that the ratio of protoplanetary disk mass to stellar mass decreases rapidly for stars exceeding 10 M_{☉}.

Per a model, one hypothesis suggested so-called blanets, fundamentally similar to other planets, orbiting around a rotating supermassive black hole at least a million solar masses (M_{☉}) may harbor masses comparable to that of massive solid planets. Although the runaway accretion of the gas onto blanets to become gas giants is possible, it is likely difficult. Nevertheless, this would also depend on how fast are the orbits of blanets filled with gas.

=== Super-puffs ===
A super-puff is a type of exoplanet with a mass only a few times larger than Earth's but a radius larger than Neptune, giving it a very low mean density. They are cooler and less massive than the inflated low-density hot-Jupiters. The most extreme examples known are the three planets around Kepler-51 which are all Jupiter-sized but with densities below 0.1 g/cm^{3}.

== Extrasolar giant planets ==
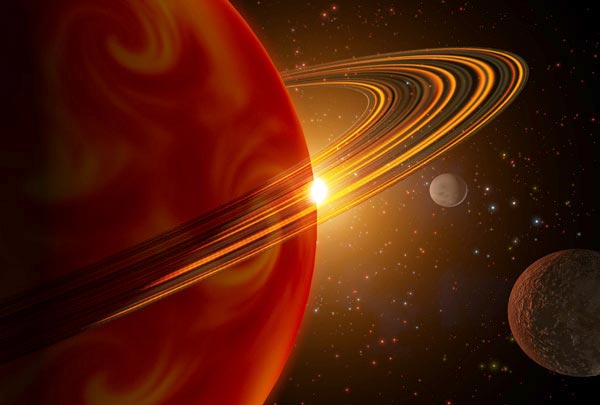
An artist's conception of 79 Ceti b, the first extrasolar giant planet found with a minimum mass less than Saturn.

Because of the limited techniques currently available to detect exoplanets, many of those found to date have been of a size associated, in the Solar System, with giant planets. Because these large planets are inferred to share more in common with Jupiter than with the other giant planets, some have claimed that "jovian planet" is a more accurate term for them. Many of the exoplanets are much closer to their parent stars and hence much hotter than the giant planets in the Solar System, making it possible that some of those planets are a type not observed in the Solar System. Considering the relative abundances of the elements in the universe (approximately 98% hydrogen and helium) it would be surprising to find a predominantly rocky planet more massive than Jupiter. On the other hand, models of planetary-system formation have suggested that giant planets would be inhibited from forming as close to their stars as many of the extrasolar giant planets have been observed to orbit.

== Atmospheres ==
The bands seen in the atmosphere of Jupiter are due to counter-circulating streams of material called zones and belts, encircling the planet parallel to its equator. The zones are the lighter bands, and are at higher altitudes in the atmosphere. They have an internal updraft and are high-pressure regions. The belts are the darker bands, are lower in the atmosphere, and have an internal downdraft. They are low-pressure regions. These structures are somewhat analogous to the high and low-pressure cells in Earth's atmosphere, but they have a very different structure—latitudinal bands that circle the entire planet, as opposed to small confined cells of pressure. This appears to be a result of the rapid rotation and underlying symmetry of the planet. There are no oceans or landmasses to cause local heating and the rotation speed is much higher than that of Earth.

There are smaller structures as well: spots of different sizes and colors. On Jupiter, the most noticeable of these features is the Great Red Spot, which has been present for at least 300 years. These structures are huge storms. Some such spots are thunderheads as well. Most of these features only last for a short time or are ephemeral (like the Great Dark Spot on Neptune), however some features are seasonal (the Great White Spot on Saturn is a notable example of such).

== See also ==
- Chthonian planet
- Planet Nine
- Planetary system
- Stellification
- Sudarsky's gas giant classification
- Terrestrial planet
- Tyche (hypothetical planet)

== Bibliography ==
- SPACE.com: Q&A: The IAU's Proposed Planet Definition, 16 August 2006, 2:00 AM ET
- BBC News: Q&A New planets proposal Wednesday, 16 August 2006, 13:36 GMT 14:36 UK
