= HD 46375 =

Star in the constellation Monoceros

Observation data Epoch J2000 Equinox ICRS
- Constellation: Monoceros
- Right ascension: 06^{h} 33^{m} 12.62259^{s}
- Declination: +05° 27′ 46.5278″
- Apparent magnitude (V): 7.91

Characteristics
- Spectral type: G9V + M0V
- B−V color index: 0.860
- Variable type: Constant

Astrometry
Radial velocity (R_{v})	−1.07±0.20 km/s
Proper motion (μ)	RA: +111.477 mas/yr Dec.: –96.918 mas/yr
Parallax (π)	33.8088±0.0435 mas
Distance	96.5 ± 0.1 ly (29.58 ± 0.04 pc)
Absolute magnitude (M_{V})	5.20

Details

A
Mass	0.91±0.01 M_{☉}
Radius	1.01±0.01 R_{☉}
Luminosity	0.77±0.01 L_{☉}
Surface gravity (log g)	4.38±0.01 cgs
Temperature	5,379±19 K
Metallicity [Fe/H]	+0.27±0.06 dex
Rotation	42+9 −7
Rotational velocity (v sin i)	0.86 km/s
Age	2.6±0.8 Gyr; 4.38±2.54 Gyr; 11.9±1.1 Gyr

B
Mass	0.576±0.013 M_{☉}
Temperature	3,663±15 K
Metallicity [Fe/H]	0.29±0.17 dex

Other designations
- BD+05°1295, HD 46375, HIP 31246, SAO 114040

Database references
SIMBAD	data

HD 46375 is double star with an exoplanetary companion in the equatorial constellation of Monoceros. It presents as an 8th-magnitude star with an apparent visual magnitude of 7.91, which is too dim to be readily visible to the naked eye. The system is located at a distance of 96.5 light-years from the Sun based on parallax measurements, but is slowly drifting closer with a radial velocity of −1 km/s. The common proper motion stellar companion, designated HD 46375 B, has a linear projected separation of 346±13 AU.

The primary component is a solar-type star with a stellar classification of G9V, matching a G-type main-sequence star. Age estimates for this star range from 2.6 up to 11.9 billion years. It is a chromospherically inactive star and is spinning slowly with a projected rotational velocity of 0.86 km/s. The absolute magnitude of this star places it one magnitude brighter than the equivalent for a zero age main sequence. It has 91% of the mass and 101% of the radius of the Sun. The star is radiating 77% of the luminosity of the Sun from its photosphere at an effective temperature of 3,663 K.

This star has sometimes been classified as a member of the NGC 2244 star cluster in the Rosette Nebula, but in reality it just happens to lie in the foreground. The distance to the cluster is much greater, about 4500 light-years.

== Planetary system ==
On March 29, 2000, the planet HD 46375 b with a minimum mass three quarters that of Saturn was discovered by Marcy, Butler, and Vogt in California, together with 79 Ceti b. This planet was discovered using the "wobble method" or radial velocity method, which calculates the rate and shape of the stellar wobble caused by the revolving planet's gravity.

The HD 46375 planetary system
Companion (in order from star)	Mass	Semimajor axis (AU)	Orbital period (days)	Eccentricity	Inclination (°)	Radius
b	>0.226±0.019 M_{J}	0.0398±0.0023	3.023573±0.000065	0.063±0.026	—	—

== See also ==
- List of extrasolar planets
