= The Committed Men =

1971 novel by M. John Harrison

- First edition
- Author: M. John Harrison
- Cover artist: John Holmes
- Language: English
- Genre: Science fiction
- Published: 1971 (Doubleday)
- Publication place: Britain
- ISBN: 978-0575042209

The Committed Men is a science fiction novel by M. John Harrison. It is Harrison's debut novel and was originally published in 1971. The book is dedicated to Michael Moorcock and Moorcock's wife, Hilary Bailey.

== Synopsis ==
In a dystopian Britain, social organization has collapsed, and the survivors, riddled with skin cancers, eke out a precarious scavenging existence in the ruins of the Great Society. A few bizarre communities try to maintain their structure in a chromium wilderness linked by crumbling motorways. But their rituals are meaningless cliches mouthed against the devastation. Only the roaming bands of hippie-style situationists have grasped that the old order, with its logic, its pseudo-liberalism and its immutable laws of cause and effect, has now been superseded. Among the mutants are a group of reptilian humans - alien, cancer-free but persecuted by the 'smoothskins'. When one of them is born of a human mother in Tinhouse, a group of humans sets off to deliver it to its own kind - a search of the committed men for the tribes of mutants.

== Reception ==
Writing in The Encyclopedia of Science Fiction, science fiction specialist John Clute wrote, "[The Committed Men] is an impressive Post-Holocaust story set in a fractured England, centering physically on the ruins of the motorways, and generating a powerful sense of entropic dismantlement."

A Kirkus reviewer wrote, "It erupts into the kind of savagery and grotesquerie that John Christopher used to specialize in, as Wendover, a doctor, finally finds himself trying to save a mutant baby from his kind."

David Pringle called the novel "brief, bleak, derivative—but stylishly written."

== Possible film adaptation ==
In a 2018 interview, Harrison revealed that he had been approached about a film adaption, which he declined. Explaining his decision, he said, "I was less interested in shuffling and dealing than in saying something. I got an offer for the film rights of The Committed Men, but when I saw the treatment, I found they had reversed their conclusions. Books are about meanings, not tropes, so I said no."
