= 94 Ceti =

Trinary star system in the constellation Cetus

- Location of 94 Ceti (circled in red)

Observation data Epoch J2000.0 Equinox ICRS
- Constellation: Cetus
- Right ascension: 03^{h} 12^{m} 46.43719^{s}
- Declination: −01° 11′ 45.9613″
- Apparent magnitude (V): +5.070

Characteristics
- Spectral type: F8V / M3V / M
- U−B color index: +0.09
- B−V color index: +0.56

Astrometry
Radial velocity (R_{v})	+18.96 ± 0.08 km/s
Proper motion (μ)	RA: 194.56 mas/yr Dec.: −69.01 mas/yr
Parallax (π)	44.29±0.28 mas
Distance	73.6 ± 0.5 ly (22.6 ± 0.1 pc)
Absolute magnitude (M_{V})	+3.3

Orbit
Primary	94 Ceti A
Secondary	94 Ceti BC
Period (P)	2029±41 yr
Semi-major axis (a)	220±5 AU
Eccentricity (e)	0.26±0.01
Inclination (i)	104±2°
Longitude of the node (Ω)	97±2°
Argument of periastron (ω) (secondary)	342±7°

Orbit
Primary	94 Ceti B
Secondary	94 Ceti C
Period (P)	378.35+0.36 −0.34 d
Semi-major axis (a)	0.984±0.007 AU
Eccentricity (e)	0.360±0.005
Inclination (i)	108.323+0.581 −0.561°
Longitude of the node (Ω)	191.496+1.602 −1.562°
Periastron epoch (T)	MJD 55113.904±0.220
Argument of periastron (ω) (secondary)	334.895±0.240°

Details
Mass	1.30 M_{☉}
Radius	1.898 ± 0.070 R_{☉}
Luminosity	4.02 ± 0.05 L_{☉}
Surface gravity (log g)	3.98 ± 0.10 cgs
Temperature	6,055 ± 10.0 K
Metallicity [Fe/H]	1.15 ± 0.07 dex
Rotation	12.2 d
Rotational velocity (v sin i)	8.4 ± 0.8 km/s
Age	4.8 Gyr

Other designations
- BD−01°457, FK5 116, GJ 128, HD 19994, HIP 14954, HR 962, LTT 1515, SAO 130355

Database references
SIMBAD	data
Exoplanet Archive	data

94 Ceti (HD 19994) is a trinary star system approximately 73 light-years away in the constellation Cetus.

94 Ceti A is a yellow-white dwarf star with about 1.3 times the mass of the Sun while 94 Ceti B and C are red dwarf stars.

An infrared excess has been detected around the primary, most likely indicating the presence of a circumstellar disk at a radius of 95 AU. The temperature of this dust is 40 K.

== Stellar system ==
This system is a hierarchical triple star system with 94 Ceti A being orbited by 94 Ceti BC, a pair of M dwarfs, in 2000 years. 94 Ceti B and C meanwhile orbit each other in a 1-year orbit.

== Planetary system ==
On 7 August 2000, a planet was announced by the Geneva Extrasolar Planet Search team as a result of radial velocity measurements taken with the Swiss 1.2-metre Leonhard Euler Telescope at La Silla Observatory in Chile. It is most stable if its inclination is either 65 or 115, ± 3.

The 94 Ceti planetary system
Companion (in order from star)	Mass	Semimajor axis (AU)	Orbital period (days)	Eccentricity	Inclination (°)	Radius
b	1.855 ± 0.045 M_{J}	1.427	535.7 ± 3.1	0.30 ± 0.04	—	—

== See also ==
- 79 Ceti
- 81 Ceti
- Lists of exoplanets
