= HD 46375 b =

Hot Jupiter orbiting HD 46375 in the constellation of Monoceros

Discovery
- Discovered by: California and Carnegie Planet Search
- Discovery site: W. M. Keck Observatory
- Discovery date: March 29, 2000
- Detection method: Doppler spectroscopy

Orbital characteristics
- Apastron: 0.0423 AU (6,330,000 km)
- Periastron: 0.0373 AU (5,580,000 km)
- Semi-major axis: 0.0398 ± 0.0023 AU (5,950,000 ± 340,000 km)
- Eccentricity: 0.063±0.026
- Orbital period (sidereal): 3.023573±0.000065 d 0.008277947 y
- Average orbital speed: 144
- Time of periastron: 2,451,071.53±0.19
- Argument of periastron: 114±24
- Semi-amplitude: 33.65±0.74
- Star: HD 46375

Physical characteristics
- Mean radius: 1.02 R_{J}
- Mass: >0.23 M_{J}

HD 46375 b is an extrasolar planet located approximately 109 light-years away in the constellation of Monoceros, orbiting the star HD 46375. With 79 Ceti b on March 29, 2000, it was joint first known extrasolar planet less massive than Saturn orbiting a normal star. The planet is a "hot Jupiter", a type of planet that orbits very close to its parent star. In this case the orbital distance is only a tenth that of the planet Mercury. No transit of the planet has been detected, so its inclination must be less than 83°. Because the inclination is unknown, the true mass of the planet is not known.
