= Climbers (novel) =

1989 novel by M. John Harrison

- First edition (publ. Gollancz); Cover art by Peter Maynard
- Author: M. John Harrison
- Publisher: Victor Gollancz
- Publication date: September 1, 1989
- ISBN: 978-0-575-03632-1

Climbers is a literary novel by the British author M. John Harrison. First published in 1989 and apparently set several years earlier, the book had been out of print for several years but was reissued in paperback by Phoenix in 2004. It has attracted considerable critical acclaim and won the Boardman Tasker Prize for Mountain Literature in 1989. It was not, however, universally popular with the British climbing public, and received at least one negative review in the popular magazine Climber.

== Plot summary ==
The novel concerns the adventures of “Mike”, who, recovering from a failed marriage, falls in with a clique of hard core northern rock climbers and becomes immersed in an intense and inward-looking lifestyle in which climbing is so important that “real life” is all but excluded.

Mike is initially fascinated by this rather strange group of people and is in awe of their focus and technical competence on the rock, while their obvious incompetence in more mundane areas of life only seems to increase their glamour. For a while Mike loses himself in this closed little world but in the end seems to become disenchanted with its narrowness.

The overall tone of the book is very much one of disappointment and alienation. The pivotal event is the death of the enigmatic “Sanky” who falls 30 feet from the 5b crux of a climb he has soloed without difficulty many times in the past. His friends cannot believe he has died on an undistinguished climb that was well within his technical competence and seem to have difficulty understanding the obvious fact that a 30-foot ground fall is more likely to result in death than a twisted ankle.

The locations are easily recognisable by anyone who has climbed in the Peak and Pennines.

Harrison does find beauty in this sometimes harsh and occasionally post industrial landscape but in keeping with the general tone of the book his eye is sometimes rather jaundiced. Describing the pleasant view from the top of Stanage Edge he chooses to focus on the cement factory at Hope. Although the story is set in the (mostly) picturesque town of Holmfirth, he devotes his descriptive powers to Lodge's supermarket, the one truly hideous building in the town.

In several interviews Harrison has said that he was pleased with the book.
