= Signs of Life (Harrison novel) =

Book by M. John Harrison

- First edition
- Author: M. John Harrison
- Cover artist: Gary Day-Ellison
- Language: English
- Genre: Science fiction/ Biopunk novel
- Publisher: Gollancz
- Publication date: May 1997
- Publication place: United Kingdom
- Media type: Print Hardcover, Paperback
- Pages: 255
- ISBN: 0-575-05556-1
- OCLC: 36582017
- Dewey Decimal: 823/.914 21
- LC Class: PR6058.A6942 S55 1997

Signs of Life is a novel by M. John Harrison published in 1997. The dystopian narrative centers on Mick "China" Rose, a biomedical transportation entrepreneur, and his lover Isobel Avens's dream of flying. The novel was nominated for the British Science Fiction Award in 1997, and for the British Fantasy Award the following year.
