= Jane Johnson (writer, born 1960) =

English writer

Jane Johnson (born 1960) is an English writer of books for adults and children and fiction book editor. As a writer she has used the pseudonyms Gabriel King, jointly with M. John Harrison, and Jude Fisher, as well as her real name.

== Biography ==
Jane Johnson was educated at Liskeard Grammar School. She has a first class honours English degree, a teaching degree and a master's degree in Old Icelandic language and literature.

From 1984 to 1992, she was the editor responsible for the J.R.R. Tolkien list at George Allen & Unwin Publishers and commissioned both John Howe and Alan Lee to illustrate Tolkien's work, including Lee's acclaimed illustrated Tolkien-centenary edition of The Lord of the Rings. The publishing house was later bought by HarperCollins, where she remains a Publishing Director working remotely across the Voyager fantasy and science fiction list and crime/thrillers. Her authors there have included George R.R. Martin, Raymond E. Feist, Robin Hobb, Dean Koontz, Stuart MacBride, Jonathan Freedland, Tom Knox as S.K. Tremayne, Hannah Kaner and Mark Lawrence.

With M. John Harrison she wrote the four-volume "Gabriel King" series – the "Tag, the Cat" animal stories as catalogued by ISFDB (1997 to 2002). The series is available in e-book in the UK and are still in print in the US.

As "Jude Fisher", she worked with cast and crew to create six Visual Companion books (2001 to 2014) for the film trilogies The Lord of the Rings and The Hobbit, Peter Jackson's adaptations of Tolkien.

Johnson travelled to North Africa in 2005 to investigate a family legend about the abduction of a family in 1625 from a Cornish church by Barbary pirates, and there met Abdellatif, a Berber tribesman, who was later that year to become her husband. She now splits her time between the UK and a small town in the Anti-Atlas Mountains. Her first adult mainstream novel was The Tenth Gift, based on the Barbary pirate story. This was followed by a desert epic, set in the Sahara among the Tuareg nomads, The Salt Road. The Sultan's Wife (2012) is set in the 17th-century court of Sultan Moulay Ismail and tells the story of two slaves, an African chieftain's son Nus-Nus and an Anglo-Dutch woman Alys. It also includes an account of the embassy sent from the Moroccan sultan to the court of King Charles II which is documented in John Evelyn's Diary. Her novels are translated and sold in more than 20 countries.. Living part of the year in Morocco, Johnson has made good use of her acquired knowledge of Moroccan culture and history as a background for the novels.

In 2016 her 12th century epic, Pillars of Light, set largely inside the walls of Acre during the infamous siege during the Third Crusade was published by the University of Central Lancashire to considerable critical acclaim, and was published in paperback in 2022 by Head of Zeus. It was described by Anne Fortier as 'A masterpiece of historical fiction', and by historian Dan Jones as 'Epic and tender, as thrilling as it is moving... deftly spins a story of the crusader world that is rich, deep, complex and quite unlike anything I've read before.' The following year her account of the Fall of Granada – Court of Lions was published by Head of Zeus in the UK, Penguin Random House in Canada and by Pegasus in the US.

The Sea Gate – a WWII story set in her native Cornwall – was published by Head of Zeus in summer 2020 in the UK, and in winter 2020/21 by Simon & Schuster in Canada and the US. The White Hare, an eerie tale set in Cornwall in 1954, was praised by Jackie Morris (The Lost Words, Spell Songs) as a novel that ''sings of an earth alive with power' and by Liz Fenwick as 'A brilliant novel of love, loss, forgiveness, and healing...' It is released in the US and Canada in October 2022.

The Black Crescent, set in Morocco in 1955 as the struggle for independence from the French Protectorate comes to a head. The Sunday Times selected it as one of the historical novels of the year and called it 'a compelling narrative'.

Her latest novel, Secret of the Bees, is set in Cornwall and is something of a state of the nation novel for the county, examining themes of conflict between the tourist industry and the needs of the native Cornish, focused on the trials of Ezra Curnow, fighting eviction by rich incomers from the cottage in which he and his father were born. It was shortlisted for the Holyer an Gof awards for best Cornish novel.

Heart of Saffron, a novel about saffron being brought to Cornwall from Morocco in the 18th century and a country house full of secrets, will be published in 2027.

Her magical fantasy novels for children include The Eidolon Chronicles (Legends of the Shadow World in a US omnibus edition): The Secret Country, The Shadow World and Dragon's Fire.Two single volume stories followed: Maskmaker in 2010 and Goldseekers in 2011.

She was awarded the 2026 British Fantasy Society special award, also known as the Karl Edward Wagner Award, recognising her outstanding contribution to sf and fantasy publishing over the years.

== Bibliography ==
=== As Jane Johnson ===
For children:

- The Eidolon Chronicles (Simon & Schuster); US omnibus edition, Legends of the Shadow World (2010)
1. The Secret Country (2005)
2. Shadow World (2006)
3. Dragon's Fire (2008)
- Maskmaker (2010)
- Goldseekers (2011)

For adults, four novels set in Morocco:

- Crossed Bones (Viking Penguin UK, April 2008); US and paperback title The Tenth Gift
- The Salt Road (Viking, 2010)
- The Sultan's Wife (Viking, 2012) – based on the life of Ismail Ibn Sharif
- The Black Crescent (Apollo/Head of Zeus, 2023) - about the Moroccan fight for independence

one novel set in Syria"

- "Pillars of Light" (Random House Canada January 2016; UCLan October 2017) – the Third Crusade

one novel set in Spain

- Court of Lions (Random House Canada January 2017, Head of Zeus UK June 2017) – the Fall of Granada, the Alhambra

Four novels set in Johnson's native Cornwall

- The Sea Gate (Head of Zeus June/September 2020, Simon & Schuster Canada November 2020, Simon & Schuster US January 2021) – WWII
- The White Hare (Head of Zeus July 2022, Simon & Schuster US/Canada October 1922) folklore
- Secrets of the Bees (Apollo/Head of Zeus, 2025)
- Heart of Saffron will be published in 2027

=== As Jude Fisher ===
- Fools' Gold
1. Sorcery Rising (Earthlight, 2002)
2. Wild Magic (2004)
3. Rose of the World (2005)

Visual Companion books

- The Fellowship of the Ring: Visual Companion ("The Lord of the Rings" S., 2001)
- The Two Towers: Visual Companion (2002), with introduction by Viggo Mortensen
- The Return of the King: Visual Companion (2003)
- The Lord of the Rings: Complete Visual Companion (2004)
- The Hobbit: An Unexpected Journey: Visual Companion (2012)
- The Hobbit: The Desolation of Smaug: Visual Companion (2013)
- The Hobbit: Battle of the Five Armies: Visual Companion (2014)

=== As Gabriel King ===
Tag, the Cat

This series of animal stories by Johnson and M. John Harrison as Gabriel King was published by Century (British hardcover editions) and other Random House divisions.

1. The Wild Road (1997)
2. The Golden Cat (1998)
3. The Knot Garden (2000)
4. Nonesuch (2002)

all were reissued by Head of Zeus in 2017.
