= 94 Ceti b =

Extrasolar planet in the constellation Cetus

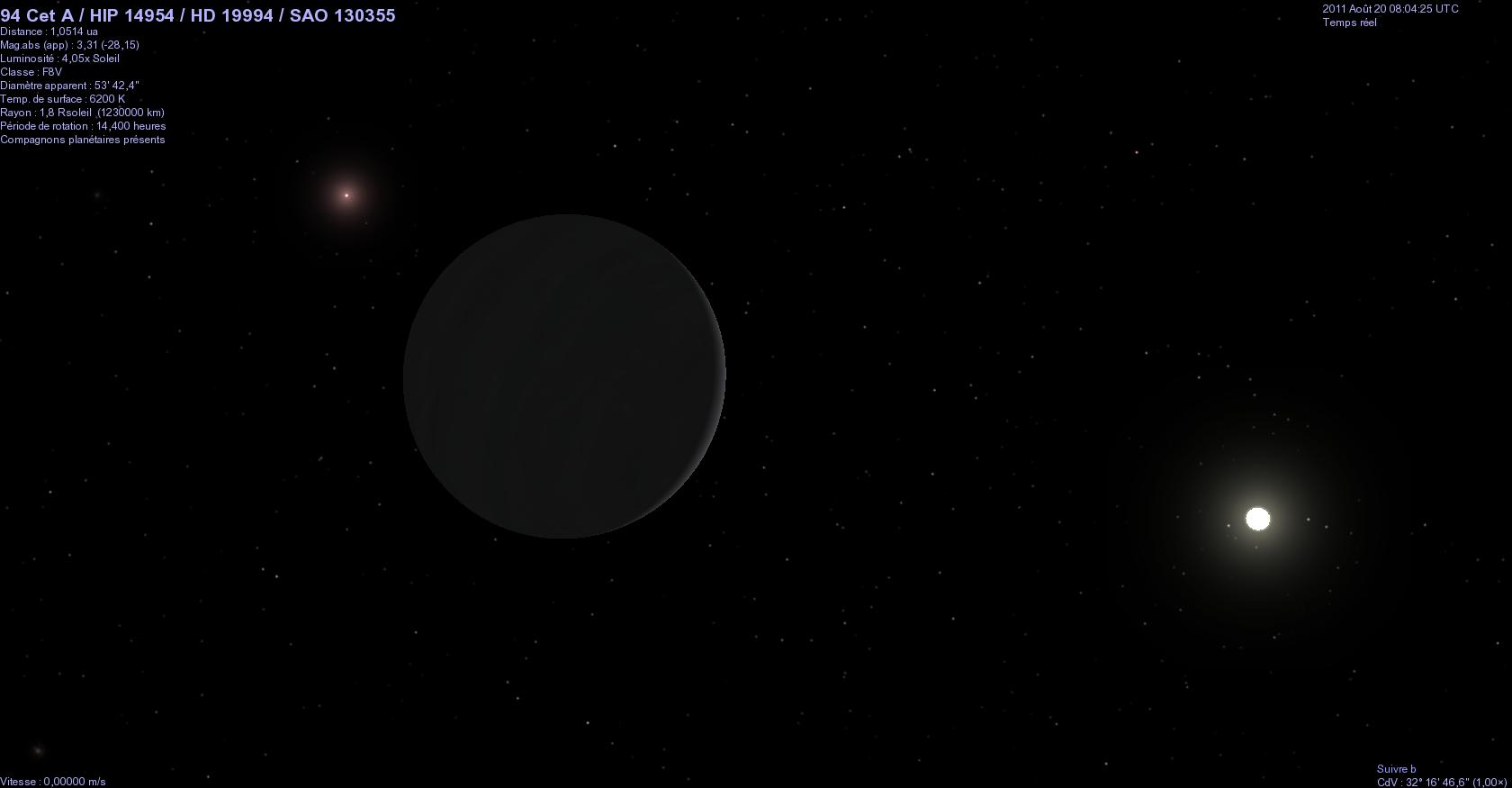
- Simulated view of the 94 Ceti binary system

Discovery
- Discovered by: Mayor et al.
- Discovery date: August 7, 2000
- Detection method: Doppler Spectroscopy

Orbital characteristics
- Semi-major axis: 1.427 AU (213,500,000 km)
- Eccentricity: 0.30±0.04
- Orbital period (sidereal): 535.7±3.1 d
- Inclination: 65 or 115 ±3
- Time of periastron: 2,450,944±12
- Argument of periastron: 41±8
- Semi-amplitude: 36.2±1.9
- Star: 94 Ceti

Physical characteristics
- Mass: 1.855±0.045 M_{J}

94 Ceti b, or 94 Ceti Ab to distinguish it from the distant red dwarf companion, is an extrasolar planet orbiting its star once every 1.2 years. It was discovered on August 7, 2000 by a team led by Michel Mayor.

It is most stable if its inclination is about 65 or 115, yielding a mass of about 1.85 that of Jupiter.

== See also ==
- Iota Horologii b
- 79 Ceti b
- 94 Ceti
