= 79 Ceti =

Binary star system in the constellation of Cetus

Observation data Epoch J2000.0 Equinox ICRS
- Constellation: Cetus
- A
- Right ascension: 02^{h} 35^{m} 19.9292^{s}
- Declination: −03° 33′ 38.173″
- Apparent magnitude (V): +6.83
- B
- Right ascension: 02^{h} 35^{m} 19.8725^{s}
- Declination: −03° 33′ 44.340″
- Apparent magnitude (V): +14.4

Characteristics

A
- Evolutionary stage: subgiant
- Spectral type: G2V
- B−V color index: 0.670±0.004

B
- Evolutionary stage: main sequence
- Spectral type: M2.5

Astrometry
Radial velocity (R_{v})	−50.93±0.09 km/s
Absolute magnitude (M_{V})	+3.88

A
Proper motion (μ)	RA: −155.501 mas/yr Dec.: −437.848 mas/yr
Parallax (π)	26.5057±0.0271 mas
Distance	123.1 ± 0.1 ly (37.73 ± 0.04 pc)

B
Proper motion (μ)	RA: −141.533 mas/yr Dec.: −442.657 mas/yr
Parallax (π)	26.5223±0.0353 mas
Distance	123.0 ± 0.2 ly (37.70 ± 0.05 pc)

Details

79 Ceti A
Mass	1.01 M_{☉}
Radius	1.48 R_{☉}
Luminosity	1.99±0.04 L_{☉}
Surface gravity (log g)	4.19±0.02 cgs
Temperature	5,806±17 K
Metallicity [Fe/H]	+0.16±0.01 dex
Rotational velocity (v sin i)	1.9 km/s
Age	6.0 or 9.4±0.8 Gyr

79 Ceti B
Mass	0.286 M_{☉}
Radius	0.361+0.004 −0.001 R_{☉}
Luminosity	0.0132+0.009 −0.004 L_{☉}
Surface gravity (log g)	4.84+0.02 −0.09 cgs
Temperature	3,265+3 −17 K

Other designations
- 79 Cet, BD−04°426, FK5 4237, GJ 9085, HD 16141, HIP 12048, SAO 129992, WDS J02353-0334A, 2MASS J02351994-0333376, Gaia DR2 2495335115182966016

Database references
SIMBAD	data
- B

79 Ceti, also known as HD 16141, is a binary star system located 123 light-years from the Sun in the southern constellation of Cetus. It has an apparent visual magnitude of +6.83, which puts it below the normal limit for visibility with the average naked eye. The star is drifting closer to the Earth with a heliocentric radial velocity of −51 km/s.

Harlan (1974) assigned this star a stellar classification of G2V, matching an ordinary G-type main-sequence star that is undergoing core hydrogen fusion. However, Houk and Swift (1999) found a class of G8IV, which suggests it has exhausted the supply of hydrogen at its core and begun to evolve off the main sequence. Eventually the outer layers of the star will expand and cool and the star will become a red giant. Estimates of the star's age range from 6.0 to 9.4 billion years old. It has an estimated 1.06 times the mass of the Sun and 1.48 times the Sun's radius. The star is radiating twice luminosity of the Sun from its photosphere at an effective temperature of 5,806 K.

A red dwarf companion at a projected separation of 220 AU was discovered in 2005. There is a suspicion that the companion may itself be a close binary.

== Planetary system ==
On March 29, 2000, a planet orbiting primary star was announced, it was discovered using the radial velocity method. This object has a minimum 0.26 times the mass of Jupiter and is orbiting its host star every 75.5 days.

The 79 Ceti planetary system
Companion (in order from star)	Mass	Semimajor axis (AU)	Orbital period (days)	Eccentricity	Inclination (°)	Radius
b	≥0.260±0.028 M_{J}	0.363±0.021	75.523±0.055	0.252±0.052	—	—

== See also ==
- 81 Ceti
- 94 Ceti
- Lists of exoplanets
