= Nova Swing =

2006 novel by M. John Harrison

- First UK edition cover
- Author: M. John Harrison
- Cover artist: Dominic Harman
- Publisher: Gollancz
- Publication date: January 2006
- Media type: hardback, paperback
- Pages: 247
- ISBN: 0-575-07027-7
- OCLC: 69022198
- Dewey Decimal: 823/.914 22
- LC Class: PR6058.A6942 N68 2006
- Preceded by: Light
- Followed by: Empty Space

Nova Swing is a science fiction novel by M. John Harrison published in 2006. It takes place in the same universe as Light. The novel won the Arthur C. Clarke and Philip K. Dick Awards in 2007.

== Overview ==
Nova Swing takes place long after the events of Light, where we first discover the disturbance in the space-time continuum known as the Kefahuchi Tract. The novel's thematic focus is the Event Site in the city of Saudade, which is on an unnamed planet.

The Event Site was created when a piece of the Tract fell to the ground, transforming the appearance and even the physics of the port area and commercial buildings. The Site draws tourists from other planets, led by hardened guide Vic Serotonin, who specialises in dangerous and unpredictable tours of this chaotic zone.

One of the narrative's threads play out as a consequence of 'artefacts' being brought out of the Event Site by tourists. This, in the eyes of the police. is regarded as Site Crime. There is also evidence that the Site is transmitting other-worldly people to Saudade through a bar that sits on a beach close to the Site border.

The motif of the Site recalls the Zone in Roadside Picnic by Boris and Arkady Strugatsky. However the novel incorporates many aspects of noir fiction into its narrative. The stories of Vic and his nemesis Detective Ascheman take on the classic noir of tortured police procedurals and hunted/haunted criminal tropes, while also subverting them.

Unlike the first book, Nova Swing stays in one future time. There are no visits to the 1999 period of Light.

== Main characters ==
Vic Serotonin: Vic is short for Vico. He is a Travel Agent and makes a living from taking clients into The Site. He bases himself at the bar Black Cat White Cat where he spends his leisure time 'caning it' most nights on Black Heart rum.

Liv Hula: An ex-pilot who has wandered the planets of The Beach, the area bordering the Tract, who owns the Black Cat White Cat bar and lives above the shop. She apparently flew with Ed Chianese, who we met in Light.

Fat Antoyne: Vic's one-time side-kick and drinking partner, whom he treats badly. Antoyne is an ex-navigator and is growing tired of Vic's abuse and dreams of starting up a business of his own.

Irene: Originally from a backwater agricultural planet, she escaped her dull life. She bought an Uncle Zip Mona tailoring package (a genetic body transformation process) to change herself into a desirable sex worker. She becomes Antoyene's girlfriend and helps further his plans.

Detective Aschemann: The head of Site Crime. He has tailoring that gives him the appearance of a middle-aged Albert Einstein. He believes in a relaxed form of police-work much to the annoyance of his assistant. He drives a beautifully restored 1960's Cadillac convertible.

The Assistant: Nothing is known about this policewoman's background. She is tall, trigger happy and ready for extreme violence at any time. Her tailoring, believed to be beyond military spec, makes her superhumanly fast.

Paulie DeRaad: The biggest gangster in Saudade, he owns a bar called the Semiramide Club where he keeps his office. He buys an alien artefact from Vic Serotonin, who has illegally taken it from the Site.

Emil Bonaventure: A one-time Site explorer who in the past has tried to map and detail the ever-changing topography and physics of the area. He has lost many acquaintances in the Site and the experience has turned him into a bed-ridden wreck. He is tended by his daughter, Edith.

Edith Bonaventure: As a child she was an accomplished accordion player who performed on many planets, appearing with lacquered instruments and matching outfits. She has now given up a portion of her adult life to look after her father.

== Cats and other locations ==
Black and white cats: The theme of cats was established in Light as the pair that Tate and Kearney had in their research lab. The cats reacted strongly to various on-screen images produced by the mathematics that Tate and Kearney were developing. In Nova Swing, cats appear in vast numbers running down the street to the Event Site — every dawn and dusk.

Shadow Operators: Possibly an alien race of incredible age who have lost any ambition. They mostly present as helpful old women who, when in repose, cluster in the ceiling corners of every building and space craft. When an opportunity arises, they tend to fly around any interested person, saying quietly, "Can we help dear? Would you like a cup of tea?"

Uncle Zip: The master tailor and creator of many identities, who appeared in person in Light, now is established as an interstellar franchise in Nova Swing.

== Reception ==
Publishers Weekly said " Harrison privileges atmosphere over plot, using grotesquely beautiful narration and elliptical dialogue to convey the beautifully delineated angst of Saudade's extraordinary inhabitants. Although not for everyone, Harrison's trippy style will appeal to sophisticated readers who treasure the work of China Miéville and Jeff VanderMeer."

Regina Schroeder in her review for Booklist said "with its gritty, noirish atmosphere, elements of space opera, and some impressive moments of explosive action, this is a tasty, entertaining morsel, deeply flavored to satisfy the thoughtful."

Kirkus Reviews described it as "a cross between J. G. Ballard's intense, static The Drowned World and Arkady and Boris Strugatsky's terrifying Roadside Picnic. The upshot: This science-fiction noir cum literary and social criticism is memorable, perplexing and challenging in equal measure."

Nova Swing won or was shortlisted for several science fiction awards, including:

- 2006 British Science Fiction Association Award nominee
- 2007 Arthur C. Clarke Award winner
- 2007 Philip K. Dick Award winner
- 2007 British Fantasy Award nominee
- 2007 John W. Campbell Award nominee

== Critical essays ==
Leigh Blackmore. "Undoing the Mechanisms: Genre Expectation, Subversion and Anti-Consolation in the Kefahuchi Tract Novels of M. John Harrison." Studies in the Fantastic. 2 (Winter 2008/Spring 2009). (University of Tampa Press).
