= Light (novel) =

2002 novel by M. John Harrison

- First UK edition
- Author: M. John Harrison
- Cover artist: Chris Moore
- Language: English
- Publisher: Gollancz
- Publication date: 31 October 2002
- Publication place: United Kingdom
- Media type: Print (Hardback and paperback)
- Pages: 320
- ISBN: 0-575-07026-9
- OCLC: 53391657
- Followed by: Nova Swing

Light is a science fiction novel by M. John Harrison published in 2002. It received the James Tiptree, Jr. Award and a BSFA nomination in 2002, and was shortlisted for the Arthur C. Clarke Award in 2003. The Guardian ranked Light #91 in its list of 100 Best Books of the 21st Century.

== Overview ==
The book centres on the lives of three individuals — the physicist (and serial killer) Michael Kearney, on the verge of a breakthrough in theoretical physics sometime in 1999; Seria Mau Genlicher, the cybernetically altered female pilot of a "K-ship"; and the ex-space pilot and adventurer Ed Chianese. Seria Mau's and Ed's stories take place in the year 2400 AD.

The lives of these three individuals are linked in many ways, though most tangibly by the presence of a mysterious creature called The Shrander, who appears in many guises to all three characters throughout the novel (with anagrammatic names of Sandra Shen and Dr. Haends). They are also linked by the Kefahuchi Tract, a space-time anomaly described as "a singularity without an event horizon", an object of awe and wonder that has been the ruin of many civilisations attempting to decode its mysteries.

The Shrander takes many forms, most often with the body of an old woman in a maroon wool coat, with a horse's skull for a head which may be similar to its original form. Harrison appears to have taken his inspiration for this strange entity from the legend of the Mari Lwyd, a creature with a horse's skull for a head, bedecked in ribbons, that features in the ancient folklore of Gwent and Glamorgan.

Elements of Light originally surfaced in Harrison's short fiction, particularly the stories "The Horse of Iron and How We Can Know It" and "The Incalling". The former contains prototypes of the Shrander and Kearney characters, whilst the latter deals with the Sprakes, a clan of dubious urban magicians. Both stories are available in the collected volume of Harrison's short fiction, Things That Never Happen.

== Characters ==
=== Michael Kearney strand (1999 AD) ===
Michael Kearney: A 40-year-old physicist and serial killer. Plagued by hallucinations of - or visitations from - a mysterious entity he calls "The Shrander".

Brian Tate: Kearney's research partner, whose dedication to his research into the physics of "decoherence free space" is eroding his marriage and, possibly, his sanity. Kearney and Tate's research ultimately paves the way for humanity to explore space.

Anna Kearney: Kearney's ex-wife, a psychologically brittle, (though eternally optimistic) woman of 40. When the novel begins, she is in a relationship, but the impromptu arrival of her ex-husband destroys this, and she and Michael begin their relationship again.

Valentine Sprake: A street drunk who first meets Kearney on an overground train, and guesses his terrible secret. The two become partners in magic and crime; it is hinted that Sprake has prophetic abilities, and his sister describes him as "one of the five most powerful magicians in London", a claim which Kearney mocks.

=== Seria Mau strand (2400 AD) ===
Seria Mau Genlicher: Seria Mau signed up to Earth Military Contracts at the age of 13, whereupon she was cybernetically fused to her K-ship, the White Cat. She subsequently went rogue and became a freelance assassin. Though she is in control of a ship of devastating capabilities, Seria Mau has not matured emotionally, and is prone to fits of murderous rage, lust and caprice.

Uncle Zip: A "tailor" (gene manipulator) based on the planet Motel Splendido, who deals in dubious merchandise. It is he who tells Seria Mau where she might find the space pilot Billy Anker.

Mona the Clone: A vain, empty-headed young woman who boards the White Cat with a team of salvagers. When they are killed, Seria Mau takes pity on her and allows her to live on board, though their relationship is fraught. It is heavily implied that "Mona" is one of the most common and fashionable "looks" for women in the galaxy, and the novel is filled with numerous versions of her.

Billy Anker: A decrepit "entradista" whom Seria Mau meets, rescues, and later murders. A daredevil pilot in his youth, he is a clone of Uncle Zip.

=== Ed Chianese strand (2400 AD) ===
Ed Chianese: A thrill-seeker, adventurer and "twink" (Virtual Reality addict) who finds work as a "futurist" (essentially a performing oracle) at a circus run by Sandra Shen.

Evie and Bella Cray: The Cray Sisters are notorious gangsters, to whom Ed owes money. Their hunt for him wrenches Ed from his various addictions and towards his true destiny.

Tig Vesicle: A "new man", one of a curious race of aliens who invaded Earth centuries ago. He and his wife Neena hide Ed when he is on the run.

Annie Glyph: a "rickshaw girl", genetically modified for the strength and speed required for long shifts pulling a rickshaw. Ed saves her life, and the two of them embark on an affair.

== Reception ==
The Scottish author Iain Banks, writing for The Guardian, gave it a rave review, calling it "a novel of full-spectrum literary dominance... of – and about – the highest order." Regina Schroeder in review for Booklist described the novel as "sometimes space opera, sometimes a kind of noir fiction, Harrison’s novel is a cleverly assembled contemplation of how choices make lives and of opening quantum mechanical doors on bizarre potential futures." Publishers Weekly said that "this is space opera for the intelligentsia, as Harrison...tweaks aspects of astrophysics, fantasy and humanism to hum right along with the blinking holograms in a welcome and long overdue return." Kirkus Reviews said this novel was a "profoundly thoughtful, complex, fascinating, and sometimes bewildering mosaic. Does it all add up? Well, objectively speaking, not altogether--and perhaps that's the point."

== References and allusions ==
The novel is replete with references to Harrison's many interests: mountaineering, rock music, etc. Song lyrics, references to old TV shows and numerous other allusions are dropped into the narrative at various points. There are at least three allusions to the world of mountaineering in the book: the use of the word "benighted", often used by climbers to describe being trapped on a crag by encroaching darkness, the cruiser named Touching the Void a reference to the book of the same name by Joe Simpson and the remark by Chianese that "You don't get the tick unless you come back". There are also several references to The Stars My Destination by Alfred Bester, most notably the borrowed line about the vacuum of space "smelling of lemons". One character is named Otto Rank, presumably after the psychoanalyst. Seria Mau Genlicher's name is almost certainly a reference to Sarah Michelle Gellar, and at one point Kearney's partner Brian Tate reflects on watching reruns of Buffy the Vampire Slayer.

Several of the chapters are also named after rock songs or albums. Agents of Fortune is an album by Blue Öyster Cult, and "Tumbling Dice" is named after the Rolling Stones song. In addition, the street gang who are assigned to find Ed Chianese in New Venusport are called The Skeleton Keys of the Rain, after a Bob Dylan lyric. The Shadow Operators, ghosts of old code who congregate in human ships, are apt to quote old song lyrics, including Joe Jackson's "Is She Really Going Out with Him?".

There are also references to old BBC TV shows, particularly in the trash-talk exchanged between Seria Mau and the other K-Captain, Krishna Moire. Seria Mau, upon firing a missile at Moire's pod of ships, declares "Here's one I made earlier", a catchphrase from Blue Peter, and Moire later responds with "It's goodnight from me. And a fucking goodnight to you", a profane parody of one of the catchphrases of The Two Ronnies.

== London locations ==
Many real London locations are utilised; Anna Kearney's flat is in Grove Park, near Chiswick; Kearney and Brian Tate's laboratory is in Bloomsbury; the offices of the venture capitalist that Tate sells his and Kearney's research to (and whom Kearney subsequently murders) is in Walthamstow, Kearney's private members club is in Greek Street, Soho; and Valentine Sprake and his family live in Kilburn. It is here where Kearney finds Sprake dead. Kearney first encounters The Shrander at Charing Cross, and meets a homeless woman who may or may not be her in Soho Square. Anna Kearney also follows Michael, at a distance, from Hammersmith, through Victoria to West Croydon, whereupon they discover the ultimate fate of Brian Tate.

The other strands often refer tangentially to Kearney's London; for instance, the backwater planet on which Seria Mau temporarily strands Mona the Clone is situated in a star system called Perkins' Rent, named after a street near Victoria.

== Sequels ==
Harrison wrote a sequel, Nova Swing, which was published in 2006. Set a generation after the events of Light, it deals with characters alluded to in the first novel, including Liv Hula, who "flew dipships" with Ed Chianese. The third novel of what is now the Kefahuchi tract trilogy is Empty Space (2012).

== Critical essays ==
- Leigh Blackmore. "Undoing the Mechanisms: Genre Expectation, Subversion and Anti-Consolation in the Kefahuchi Tract Novels of M. John Harrison." Studies in the Fantastic. 2 (Winter 2008/Spring 2009). (University of Tampa Press).
