= A Storm of Wings =

1980 novel by M. John Harrison

- Author: M. John Harrison
- Language: English
- Genre: Science fiction
- Published: 1980
- Publisher: Doubleday
- Pages: 177
- ISBN: 9780385147651
- OCLC: 6041103

A Storm of Wings is a novel by M. John Harrison published in 1980. It is the second novel in the Viriconium series, following The Pastel City.

== Plot summary ==
A Storm of Wings is a novel in which an invasion of apparent alien locusts brings a worldview that is incompatible with that of humanity.

== Reception ==
Dave Langford, reviewing A Storm of Wings for White Dwarf #93, compared it to Saraband of Lost Time, stating that "Critics prefer Storm's literary echoes and clever bits; but for all its excessive length, more readers are likely to finish Saraband."

== Reviews ==
- Review by Jack Rems (1980) in Locus, #234 June 1980
- Review by Bob Wayne (1980) in Fantasy Newsletter, No. 27 August 1980
- Review by Algis Budrys (1980) in The Magazine of Fantasy & Science Fiction, October 1980
- Review by Baird Searles (1980) in Isaac Asimov's Science Fiction Magazine, December 1980
- Review by Colin Greenland (1981) in Foundation, #21 February 1981
- Review by David Pringle (1988) in Modern Fantasy: The 100 Best Novels
- Review [French] by Patrick Imbert (2004) in Bifrost, #34
