= 79 Ceti b =

Exoplanet orbiting 79 Ceti

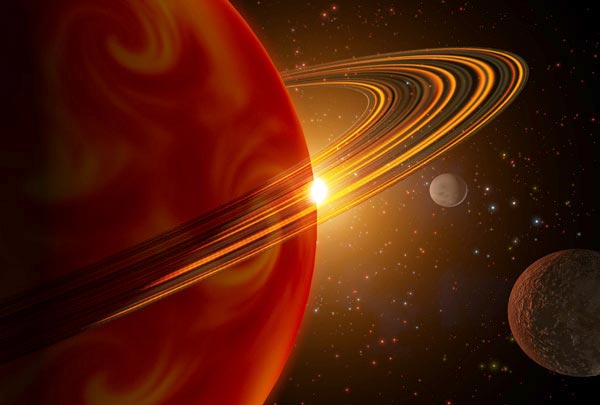
- An artist's conception of 79 Ceti b (min mass ~0.26 MJ), an exoplanet with a mass less than Saturn

Discovery
- Discovered by: California and Carnegie Planet Search
- Discovery site: W. M. Keck Observatory
- Discovery date: March 29, 2000
- Detection method: Doppler spectroscopy

Orbital characteristics
- Semi-major axis: 0.363 ± 0.021 AU (54,300,000 ± 3,100,000 km)
- Eccentricity: 0.252±0.052
- Orbital period (sidereal): 75.523±0.055 d
- Time of periastron: 2,450,338.0±3.0
- Argument of periastron: 42±14
- Semi-amplitude: 11.99±0.87
- Star: 79 Ceti

Physical characteristics
- Mass: >0.260±0.028 M_{J}

79 Ceti b (also known as HD 16141 b) is an extrasolar planet orbiting 79 Ceti every 75 days. Discovered along with HD 46375 b on March 29, 2000, it was the joint first known extrasolar planet to have minimum mass less than the mass of Saturn.

== See also ==
- 94 Ceti b
