= In Viriconium =

1982 novel by M. John Harrison

In Viriconium is a novel by M. John Harrison published in 1982. It is the third novel in the Viriconium series.

== Plot summary ==
In Viriconium is a novel in which a city suffers from a metaphysical lethargy.

== Reception ==
Dave Pringle reviewed In Viriconium for Imagine magazine, and stated that "Harrison has a wickedly acute eye for human folly; every so often this novel makes you wince as though you have just caught sight of yourself in an unfriendly mirror."

Dave Langford reviewed In Viriconium for White Dwarf #54, and stated that "Even the city's gods are trying low life, inventing horrors like 'donkey jackets, wellington boots and small white plastic trays covered in congealed food' while the plague zone grows. Oblique and enigmatic, but wonderful."

== Reviews ==
- Review by Faren Miller (1983) in Locus, #265 February 1983
- Review by David Pringle (1983) in Interzone, #4 Spring 1983
- Review by Baird Searles (1983) in Isaac Asimov's Science Fiction Magazine, June 1983
- Review by Algis Budrys (1983) in The Magazine of Fantasy & Science Fiction, July 1983
- Review by Roz Kaveney (1983) in Foundation, #29 November 1983
- Review by Vincent Omniaveritas (1983) in Cheap Truth #1
- Review [French] by Patrick Imbert (2004) in Bifrost, #34
