= Viriconium Nights =

1984 collection by M. John Harrison

Viriconium Nights is a collection by M. John Harrison published in 1984.

== Contents ==
Viriconium Nights is a collection of seven stories which take place inside the metropolis of Viriconium and its surrounding area.

=== 1984 Ace edition ===
- The Lamia and Lord Cromis
- Lamia Mutable
- Viriconium Knights
- Events Witnessed from a City
- The Luck in the Head
- The Lords of Misrule
- In Viriconium
- Strange Great Sins

=== 1985 Gollancz edition ===
- The Luck in the Head
- The Lamia and Lord Cromis
- Strange Great Sins
- Viriconium Knights
- The Dancer from the Dance
- Lords of Misrule
- A Young Man's Journey to Viriconium

== Reception ==
Dave Langford reviewed Viriconium Nights for White Dwarf #70, and stated that "They have a precise, exotic sleaziness, leaving you with uncomfortable images: insect-masks recur, and the Mari Llwyd (the rib-boned horse-skull of folklore), and technological decay (as with the unforgettable, filthy power-weapon of the first story). I like them. I think."

== Publication history ==
New York: Ace (paperback), 1984 (dedicated to Algis Budrys); revised/definitive edition, (1st hardcover ed) London: Gollancz, 1985 (dedication to Budrys removed). The stories in the British hardcover edition are revised and the author's preferred texts.

== Reviews ==
- Review by Brian Stableford (1985) in Fantasy Review, February 1985
- Review by Baird Searles (1985) in Isaac Asimov's Science Fiction Magazine, February 1985
- Review by Barbara Davies (1985) in Vector 128
