= Don Leslie (actor) =

American actor

- Born: 1948 (age 77–78)
- Occupation: Actor

Don Leslie is an American actor and audiobook narrator, known for voicing General Modula in Sym-Bionic Titan, Ra's al Ghul in the videogame Batman: Dark Tomorrow and Batman in audio books.

== Filmography ==
=== Film ===
Year	Title	Role	Notes
1969	John and Mary	Night Bartender	Uncredited
1977	Orca	Young Fisherman	Uncredited
1981	Prince of the City	D.A. Louis D'Amato	
1982	The Royal Romance of Charles and Diana	Reporter	Television film
1998	Desert Blue	Additional Voices	

=== Television ===
Year	Title	Role	Notes
2000	Law & Order	Louis Farb	Episode: "Collision"
2001	As the World Turns	Judge Horowitz	Episode dated 8 May 2001
2006	Numbers	Bartender	Episode: "Undercurrents"
2010–2011	Sym-Bionic Titan	General Modula (voice)	7 episodes

=== Videogames ===
Year	Title	Role	Notes
2002	TOCA Race Driver	'Cannonball' Jack Johnson	
2003	Batman: Dark Tomorrow	Ra's al Ghul	
2011	Star Wars: The Old Republic	Additional Voices	
2012	Warhammer Online: Wrath of Heroes	Red Duke	
2015	Warframe	Cephalon Jordas	
2016	Dishonored 2	Workers	
2017	Dishonored: Death of the Outsider	Workers	

=== Books ===
Book title	Book author	Role	Release date	Notes
Batman: Legends of Robin	John Whitman	Bruce Wayne / Batman	1996	
Batman & Robin: An Audio-Action Adventure	Kevin Thomsen	Bruce Wayne / Batman	1997	
LRRP Company Command	Kregg P.J. Jorgenson	Narrator	06-07-2001	
Diary of an Airborne Ranger	Frank Johnson	Narrator	06-07-2001	
Robert Ludlum's The Altman Code	Robert Ludlum, Gayle Lynds	Narrator	06-13-2003	An abridged edition was released on 09-24-2004
Lone Star Nation	H.W. Brands	Narrator	02-12-2004	
Aloft	Chang-Rae Lee	Narrator	04-07-2004	
Younger Next Year	Chris Crowley, Henry S. Lodge	Narrator	02-10-2005	One of multiple credited narrators
Falls the Shadow	William Lashner	Narrator	04-24-2005	
The Ape in the Corner Office	Richard Conniff	Narrator	09-06-2005	
A Life That Matters	Mary Schindler et al.	Narrator	03-27-2006	One of multiple credited narrators
Crazy Busy	Edward Hallowell	Narrator	05-16-2006	
Blood and Thunder	Hampton Sides	Narrator	10-09-2006	An abridged edition was released on 09-22-2006
Under and Alone	William Queen	Narrator	12-01-2006	
Buried in the Bitter Waters	Eliot Jaspin	Narrator	02-05-2007	
Report from Ground Zero	Dennis Smith	Narrator	02-21-2007	
Become Who You Were Born to Be	Brian Souza	Narrator	03-29-2007	
The 33 Strategies of War	Robert Greene	Narrator	04-25-2007	
The 48 Laws of Power	Robert Greene	Narrator	04-25-2007	
The Real All Americans	Sally Jenkins	Narrator	04-30-2007	
Jesus of Nazareth	Pope Benedict XVI	Narrator	05-02-2007	
The Nine	Jeffrey Toobin	Narrator	08-15-2007	
L. Ron Hubbard Presents Writers of the Future, Volume 23	Jeff Carlson et al.	Narrator	10-10-2007	One of multiple credited narrators
The Innovator's Dilemma	Clayton M. Christensen	Narrator	11-27-2007	
Secret Ingredients	David Remnick	Narrator	12-04-2007	One of multiple credited narrators
Hog Pilots, Blue Water Grunts	Robert D. Kaplan	Narrator	12-05-2007	An abridged edition was released 08-15-2007
The Thing About Life Is That One Day You'll Be Dead	David Shields	Narrator	02-05-2008	
The Best of Best American Erotica, The Final Edition	Susie Bright et al.	Narrator	02-06-2008	One of multiple credited narrators
Voice of the Whirlwind	Walter Jon Williams	Narrator	07-10-2008	
Valentine Pontifex	Robert Silverberg	Narrator	08-05-2008	One of multiple credited narrators
Majipoor Chronicles	Robert Silverberg	Narrator	08-05-2008	One of multiple credited narrators
Churchill, Hitler, and 'The Unnecessary War'	Patrick J. Buchanan	Narrator	08-29-2008	
American Prince	Peter Golenbock, Tony Curtis	Narrator	10-14-2008	
Buyology	Martin Lindstrom	Narrator	10-21-2008	
Ender in Exile	Orson Scott Card	Narrator	11-11-2008	One of multiple credited narrators
Orson Scott Card's InterGalactic Medicine Show	Orson Scott Card et al.	Narrator	11-24-2008	One of multiple credited narrators
The Man Who Owns the News	Michael Wolff	Narrator	12-02-2008	
The Return of Depression Economics and the Crisis of 2008	Paul Krugman	Narrator	12-23-2008	
Loser's Town	Daniel Depp	Narrator	03-03-2009	
Take One	Karen Kingsbury	Narrator	03-10-2009	One of multiple credited narrators
X - The Erotic Treasury	Susie Bright	Narrator	06-16-2009	One of multiple credited narrators
The State of Jones	John Stauffer, Sally Jenkins	Narrator	06-23-2009	An abridged edition was released at the same time
Victory Square	Olen Steinhauer	Narrator	09-23-2009	
Take Two	Karen Kingsbury	Narrator	10-06-2009	One of multiple credited narrators
The Power of Servant Leadership	Robert K. Greenleaf	Narrator	11-17-2009	
The Hanged Man	Orson Scott Card	Narrator	01-05-2010	One of multiple credited narrators
Take Three	Karen Kingsbury	Narrator	03-25-2010	One of multiple credited narrators
AND: The Gathered and Scattered Church	Hugh Halter, Matt Smay	Narrator	04-13-2010	One of multiple credited narrators
History Revisited: The Great Battles	J. David Markham, Mike Resnick	Narrator	04-15-2010	One of multiple credited narrators
Pull Up a Chair	Curt Smith	Narrator	04-22-2010	
What Is God Really Like?	Craig Groeschel et al.	Narrator	06-11-2010	One of multiple credited narrators
Blind Descent	James Tabor	Narrator	06-15-2010	
Take Four	Karen Kingsbury	Narrator	06-22-2010	One of multiple credited narrators
Crimes Against Liberty	David Limbaugh	Narrator	08-23-2010	
The Dispossessed	Ursula K. Le Guin	Narrator	09-14-2010	
Pathfinder	Orson Scott Card	Narrator	11-23-2010	One of multiple credited narrators
The Sam Gunn Omnibus	Ben Bova	Narrator	03-30-2011	One of multiple credited narrators
Remember Tuesday Morning	Karen Kingsbury	Narrator	10-07-2011	One of multiple credited narrators
Darby's Rangers	William O. Darby	Narrator	07-13-2012	
Columbine	Dave Cullen	Narrator	02-14-2019	25th Anniversary Memorial Edition, one of multiple credited narrators
Vengeance	A.J. Scudiere	Narrator	12-30-2019	One of multiple credited narrators
Storm Warning	Billy Graham, Franklin Graham	Narrator	09-08-2020	
Lightspeed: Year One	John Joseph Adams et al.	Narrator	08-07-2023	One of multiple credited narrators
