= The Book of Changes (disambiguation) =

The Book of Changes or The Book of Change commonly refer to the I Ching, an ancient Chinese divination text.

The Book of Changes or The Book of Change may also refer to:

- The Book of Change (Chang), a semi-biographical novel by Eileen Chang
- The Book of Changes (Silverberg), a novel by Robert Silverberg, the first book in the Majipoor series
