= Eberhard Jäckel =

German historian (1929–2017)

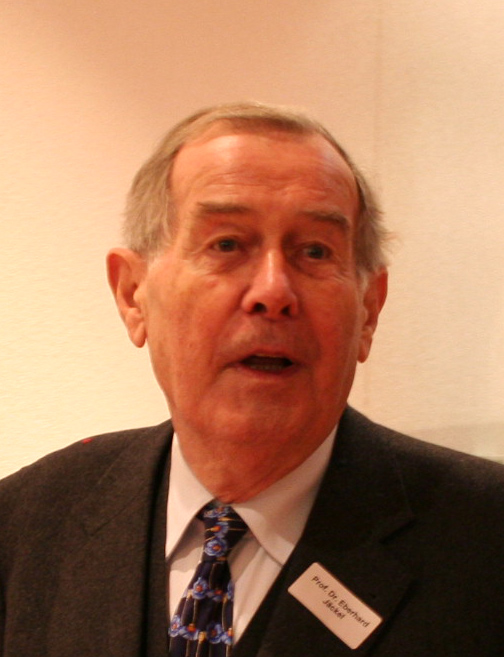
- Jäckel in 2009
- Born: 29 June 1929; Wesermünde, Hanover, Prussia
- Died: 15 August 2017 (aged 88); Stuttgart, Germany
- Education: University of Freiburg; University of Florida
- Awards: Awarded the Geschwister-Scholl-Preis
- Scientific career
- Fields: Historian
- Workplaces: University of Kiel; University of Stuttgart

Eberhard Jäckel ([ˈeːbɐhaʁt ˈjɛkəl]; 29 June 1929 – 15 August 2017) was a German historian. In the 1980s, he was a principal protagonist in the Historians' Dispute (Historikerstreit) over how to incorporate Nazi Germany and the Holocaust into German historiography and over Hitler's intentions.

== Career ==
Born in Wesermünde, Hanover, Jäckel studied history at Göttingen, Tübingen, Freiburg, Gainesville, and Paris after World War II. After serving as an assistant and docent at Kiel until 1966, he taught from 1967 and followed Golo Mann as Professor for Modern History at the University of Stuttgart, a position that Jäckel retained until retirement in 1997.

Jäckel's PhD dissertation was turned into his first book around 1966's Frankreich in Hitlers Europa ("France In Hitler's Europe"), a study of German policy towards France from 1933 to 1945. Jäckel first rose to fame through his 1969 book Hitlers Weltanschauung ("Hitler's Worldview"), which was an examination of Hitler's worldview and beliefs. Jäckel argued that far from being an opportunist with no beliefs, as had been argued by Alan Bullock, Hitler held to a rigid set of fixed beliefs and consistently acted from his "race and space" philosophy throughout his career. In Jäckel's opinion, the core of Hitler's worldview was his belief in what he saw as the merciless struggle for survival between the "Aryan race" and the "Jewish race" and in his belief that stronger "races" possessed large amounts of Lebensraum (living space). In Jäckel's view, everything that Hitler did throughout his life stemmed from the beliefs he had adopted in the 1920s.

Jäckel argued that Hitler felt there were three factors that determined a people's "racial value": its awareness of itself, the type of leadership that it had and its ability to make war. According to Jäckel, those for Germany meant ultranationalism, the Führerprinzip (Führer Principle) and militarism, and all three were the constants of Hitler's beliefs throughout his life. In Jäckel's opinion, Mein Kampf is a long rant against the three principles that Hitler saw as the antithesis of his three sacred principles: internationalism, democracy and pacifism. Jäckel asserted that for Hitler "the originators and bearers of all three counterpositions [were] the Jews". In Jäckel's view, Hitler in the Zweites Buch of 1928

established for the first time a logical link between his foreign policy conception and his antisemitism. They were synthesized in his view of history. With this, Hitler's Weltanschauung had finally achieved the kind of consistency for which he had groped for a long time.

In that way, Jäckel argued that Mein Kampf was a "blueprint" not only for power but also for genocide. Jäckel considered

He [Hitler] had to annihilate the Jews, thus restoring the meaning of history, and with the thus restored, nature-intended struggle for existence, he at the same time had to conquer new living space for the German people. Each of these tasks was inextricably linked to the other. Unless the Jews were annihilated there would very soon no longer be any struggle for living space, nor therefore any culture and consequently nations would die out; not just the German nation, but ultimately all nations. But if, on the other hand, the German people failed to conquer new living space, it would die out because of that and the Jews would triumph.

Jäckel took the view that Hitler's ideology developed in stages in the 1920s. Jäckel wrote: "It is an important fact that the final completion [of Hitler's ideology], contrary to Hitler's own statements, in 1919 had only begun". In addition, Jäckel's book can be seen noteworthy as the first account of Hitler's beliefs written in Germany by someone from the left. (Jäckel joined the SPD in 1967.)

In regard to the foreign policy debates, Jäckel was a leading "continentalist" and argued that Nazi foreign policy aimed only at the conquest of Eastern Europe, as opposed to the "globalists", who argued that Hitler wanted world conquest.

=== Genesis of the Final Solution ===
Jäckel was one of the leading intentionalists in regard to the functionalism versus intentionalism debates. Since the 1960s, he argued on that there was a long-range plan on the part of Hitler to exterminate the Jewish people from about 1924. Those views led to intense debates with functionalist historians such as Hans Mommsen and Martin Broszat. Jäckel dismissed the argument made by Broszat in his 1977 essay "Hitler and the Genesis of the Final Solution" that local officials began the Holocaust on their own initiative under the grounds that there was a

great deal of evidence that some [local officials] were shocked or even appalled when the Final Solution came into effect. To be sure, they did not disagree with it. But they agreed only reluctantly, referring again to an order given by Hitler. This is a strong indication that the idea did not originate with them.

In the late 1970s, Jäckel was a leading critic of the British author David Irving and his book Hitler’s War, which argued that Hitler was unaware of the Holocaust. Jäckel, in turn, wrote a series of newspaper articles that was later turned into the book David Irving's Hitler : A Faulty History Dissected. It attacked Irving and maintained that Hitler was very much aware of and approved of the Holocaust. Jäckel attacked Irving for claiming that an entry in Heinrich Himmler's notebook saying "Jewish transport from Berlin, not to be liquidated", on 30 November 1941 proved that Hitler did not want to see the Holocaust happen. Jäckel maintained that the order referred only to that train and argued that if Hitler had ordered the people on that train to be spared, it must stand to reason that he was aware of the Holocaust. Jäckel went on to argue that because the "Final Solution" was secret, it is not surprising that Hitler's servants who were ignorant of the Holocaust, and anyhow, five of Hitler's servants interviewed by Irving later claimed that they believed that Hitler was aware of the Holocaust. Jäckel argued that on the basis of Hitler's statements in Mein Kampf, the Führer was always committed to genocide of the Jews and that because Hitler later attempted to execute the foreign policy that he outlined in Mein Kampf, it is a reasonable assumption that Hitler was always committed to genocide. As a sign of Hitler's intentions, Jäckel used Hitler's tendency to involve himself in minutiae to argue that it is inconceivable that Hitler was unaware of the Holocaust. Jäckel used Hitler's "Prophecy Speech" of January 30, 1939 in which Hitler declared:

I shall once again be your prophet: if international Jewry with its financial power in and outside of Europe should manage once more to draw the peoples of the world into world war, then the result will not be the Bolshevization of the world, and thus the victory of Jewry, but rather the total destruction of the Jewish race in Europe

Likewise, Jäckel used Himmler's Posen speeches of 1943 and certain other statements on his part in 1944 referring to an "order" from an unnamed higher authority as proof that Hitler had ordered the Holocaust. In the same way, Jäckel noted Hitler's order of 13 March 1941 for the Einsatzgruppen to be re-established for Operation Barbarossa as proof of the Führer's involvement in the Holocaust. Jäckel also argued that the entry in Joseph Goebbels's diary on 27 March 1942 mentioning the Führer's "Prophecy" was coming true was a sign that Hitler had ordered the Holocaust. Jäckel accused Irving of dishonesty in claiming that there was no sign in the Goebbels diary that Hitler knew of the Holocaust. Finally, Jäckel noted the frequent references to the "Prophecy Speech" in Hitler's wartime speeches as a sign that Hitler had ordered the Holocaust.

In response to Jäckel's first article, Irving announced that he had seen a document from 1942 proving that Hitler had ordered the Holocaust not to occur but that the document was now lost. Jäckel wrote that he had "easily" discovered the "lost" document in which the head of the Reich Chancellery, Hans Lammers, had written to Justice Minister Franz Schlegelberger that Hitler ordered him to put the "Jewish Question" on the "back burner" until after the war. Jäckel noted that the document concerned was the result of a meeting between Lammers and Schlegelberger on 10 April 1942 concerning amendments to the divorce law concerning German Jews and Mischlinge. Jäckel noted that in 1942, there was a division of labour between the representatives of the Rechtsstaat (law state) and the Polizeistaat (police state) in Nazi Germany. Jäckel argued that for the representatives of the Rechtsstaat like the Ministry of Justice, the "Final Solution" was a bureaucratic process to deprive Jews of their civil rights and to isolate them, and for representatives of Polizeistaat like the SS, the "Final Solution" was genocide.

Jäckel argued that Hitler's order to Lammers to tell Schlegelberger that to wait until after the war before concerning him about the "impracticable" details of the divorce laws between German Jews and "Aryans" was simply Hitler's way of putting Schlegelberger off. Jäckel ended his essay that the "lost" document in no way proved that Hitler was unaware of the Holocaust and accused Irving of deceitfulness in claiming otherwise.

In 1980, Jäckel, together with Axel Kuhn, published Hitler: Sämtliche Aufzeichnungen 1905-1924, a collection of primary documents that record all of Hitler speeches and writings from 1905 to 1924. Included in the book were every surviving letter, postcard, note and poem written by Hitler. In their opinion, the editors concluded, there was a real change in Hitler's personality in 1919, with his writings before that year having been relatively apolitical and his writings starting in 1919 showing an increasing obsession with antisemitism. In April 1981, it was revealed that 16 of the 600 documents published in Hitler: Sämtliche Aufzeichnungen 1905-1924 were forgeries.

=== Historikerstreit ===
In the Historikerstreit (Historians' Dispute) of 1986-1988, Jäckel was a prominent critic of Ernst Nolte, whose theory of Nazi crimes as a reaction to Soviet crimes was denounced as ahistorical by Jäckel under the grounds that Hitler held the Soviet Union in contempt and therefore could not have possibly felt threatened by the Soviets, as Nolte suggested. Jäckel attacked Nolte's statement that Hitler had an especially-vivid fear of the Soviet "rat cage" torture by arguing that Hitler's statement of 1 February 1943 to his generals about captured German officers going off to the "rat cage" clearly meant the Lubyanka prison, and that was not, as Nolte argued, to be interpreted literally. Jäckel went on to argue that Nolte had done nothing to establish what the remarks about the "rat cage" had to do with the Holocaust. Jäckel went on to accuse Nolte of engaging in a post hoc, ergo propter hoc argument to establish the "causal nexus" between Hitler's supposed fear of the "rat cage" torture and the Holocaust.

Jäckel wrote in a 1986 essay, "The Impoverished Practice of Insinuation: The Singular Aspect of National-Socialist Crimes Cannot Be Denied", first published in the Die Zeit newspaper on September 12, 1986:

Hitler often said why he wished to remove and kill the Jews. His explanation is a complicated and structurally logical construct that can be reproduced in great detail. A rat cage, the murders committed by the Bolsheviks, or a special fear of these are not mentioned. On the contrary, Hitler was always convinced that Soviet Russia, precisely because it was ruled by Jews, was a defenseless colossus standing on clay feet. Aryans had no fear of Slavic or Jewish subhumans. The Jew, Hitler wrote in 1926 in Mein Kampf, "is not an element of an organization, but a ferment of decomposition. The gigantic empire in the East is ripe for collapse." Hitler still believed this in 1941 when he had his soldiers invade Russia without winter equipment.

More recently, Jäckel modified his position. He later believed that most of the initiatives for the Holocaust came from Hitler but that it was more the result of a series of ad hoc decisions than a master plan on the part of Hitler. In 1998, Jäckel argued that Hitler began the Holocaust in mid-1941 by playing Himmler against Heydrich.

Jäckel argued that Himmler was antisemitic but was less enthusiastic about genocide than Heydrich, who saw genocide as a way of obtaining Hitler's support for building a power base outside Himmler's control. In Jäckel's view, antisemitism was a necessary but not sufficient condition for the Holocaust under the grounds that people had been intensely antisemitic in Europe for centuries without genocide occurring.

In contrast to the functionalists, who have argued for the "weak dictator" thesis about Hitler's power, Jäckel has supported the "master of the Third Reich" thesis and has described Hitler's power as Alleinherrschaft (sole rule).

=== Uniqueness of the Holocaust ===
Against Nolte's claim that the Holocaust was not unique but rather one of out many genocides, Jäckel rejected Nolte's view and those of his supporters like Joachim Fest by writing:

I, however claim (and not for the first time) that the National Socialist murder of the Jews was unique because never before had a nation with the authority of its leader decided and announced that it would kill off as completely as possible a particular group of humans, including old people, women, children and infants, and actually put this decision into practice, using all the means of governmental power at its disposal. This idea is so apparent and so well known that it is quite astonishing that it could have escaped Fest's attention (the massacres of the Armenians in the Ottoman Empire during the First World War were, according to all we know, more like murderous deportations than planned genocide).

Jäckel accused Nolte, Fest and Klaus Hildebrand of engaging in a "game of confusion". Jäckel wrote that the "game of confusion" comprised posing hypotheses disguised as questions without proof, and when one demands proof, there is an angry response: "One is after all still allowed to ask!". In response to Jäckel's attack, Nolte in an essay that was published in the Die Zeit newspaper on 31 October 1986 wrote that Jäckel's attack was something that one might expect in an East German newspaper: "I am amazed at the coldheartedness with which Eberhard Jäckel says that not every single bourgeois was killed."

During a debate in London in 1987 to consider the Historikerstreit, Fest and Jäckel again clashed over the question of the "singularity" of the Holocaust, with Fest accusing Jäckel of presenting a "caricature" of his and Nolte's views.

The uniqueness and the singularity of the Holocaust is a major theme of Jäckel. In his view, it was like no other genocide. In an essay published in Der Spiegel on 23 December 1991, Jäckel argued against those who claimed that the East German dictatorship was just as inhumane as the Nazi dictatorship. During the Goldhagen Controversy of 1996, Jäckel was a leading critic of Daniel Goldhagen and wrote a very hostile book review in the Die Zeit newspaper in May 1996 that called Hitler's Willing Executioners "simply a bad book". The Canadian historian Fred Kautz, in defence of Goldhagen, wrote, "Jackel is not a 'structuralist', but a Hitler biographer. He expounds the theory that Hitler alone was driven by the explicit desire to kill all the Jews and that in essence only he is guilty. This narrows down the question of guilt to only one evil person and absolves the 'ordinary Germans'".

=== Last years ===
The partnership with Lea Rosh begun in 1988 and led to a widely-watched four-part television documentary, Der Tod ist ein Meister aus Deutschland, a popular book of the same name and the Geschwister-Scholl-Preis in 1990. With Lea, Jäckel also led the drive to create a memorial in Berlin to the murdered Jews of Europe. The Holocaust-Mahnmal opened in 2005.

In March 2006 in a feuilleton (opinion) piece in the Frankfurter Allgemeine Zeitung, Jäckel wrote a book review that approved of Guenter Lewy's thesis in his book The Armenian Massacres in Ottoman Turkey about the 1915 Armenian Massacres that massacres but no genocide occurred of the Armenians. Jäckel's critics accused him of disregarding the fact that Ottoman troops were crossing the border and exterminating Armenians outside the Ottoman Empire in 1918 (the Young Turks' campaign in Caucasus killed 40,000 Armenians) and in 1920 (Kemalist troops killed 60,000 civilians).

== Selected works ==
- Frankreich in Hitlers Europa : die deutsche Frankreichpolitik im Zweiten Weltkrieg, Stuttgart : Deutsche Verlags-Anstalt, 1966.
- Hitlers Weltanschauung : Entwurf einer Herrschaft, Stuttgart : Deutsche Verlags-Anstalt, 1969 translated into English as Hitler's World View : A Blueprint for Power by Herbert Arnold, Cambridge, Mass. : Harvard University Press, 1972, 1981 ISBN 0-674-40425-4.
- Deutsche Parlamentsdebatten, Frankfurt a. M. u. Hamburg; Fischer-Bücherei 1970.
- Die Funktion der Geschichte in unserer Zeit, Stuttgart : Klett, 1975 ISBN 3-12-902160-4.
- "Litaraturbericht: Rückblick auf die sogenanngte Hitler-Welle" ("A Look at the So-Called Hitler Wave") pages 695-711 from Geschichte in Wissenschaft und Unterricht, Volume 28, 1977.
- Hitler Sämtliche Aufzeichnungen 1905-1924 , Stuttgart : Deutsche Verlags-Anstalt, 1980 ISBN 3-421-01997-5.
- "Wie kam Hitler an die Macht?" pages 305-321 from Weimar Selbstpreisgabe einer Demokratie edited by Karl Dietrich Edmann and Hagen Schulze, Düsseldorf, 1980
- Co-edited with Jürgen Rohwer Kriegswende Dezember 1941 : Referate und Diskussionsbeiträge des internationalen historischen Symposiums in Stuttgart vom 17. bis 19. September 1981, Koblenz : Bernard & Graefe, 1984 ISBN 3-7637-5433-4.
- Co-written with Jürgen Rohwer Der Mord an den Juden im Zweiten Weltkrieg : Entschlussbildung und Verwirklichung, Stuttgart : Deutsche Verlags-Anstalt, 1985 ISBN 3-421-06255-2.
- Hitler in History, Hanover, NH : Published for Brandeis University Press by University Press of New England, 1984 ISBN 0-87451-311-1.
- Hitlers Herrschaft. Vollzug einer Weltanschauung, Stuttgart: Deutsche Verlags-Anstalt, 1986.
- Co-written with Lea Rosh Der Tod ist ein Meister aus Deutschland', Komet, 1990 ISBN 3-933366-44-5
- "Une querelle d'Allemands? La misérable pratique des sous-entendus" pages 95–98 from Documents, Volume 2, 1987.
- "Die doppelte Vergangenheit" pages 29–43 from Der Spiegel, December 23, 1991.
- David Irving's Hitler : a faulty history dissected : two essays translation and comments by H. David Kirk; with a foreword by Robert Fulford; Port Angeles, Wash.; Brentwood Bay, B.C. : Ben-Simon Publications, 1993 ISBN 0-914539-08-6
- "The Impoverished Practice of Insinuation: The Singular Aspect of National-Socialist Crimes Cannot Be Denied" pages 74–78 from Forever In The Shadow of Hitler? edited by Ernst Piper, Humanities Press, Atlantic Highlands, 1993.
- "L'arrivé d"Hitler au pouvoir: un Tschernobly de l'histoire" from Weimar ou de la Démocratie en Allemagne edited by Gilbert Krebs and Gérard Schneilin, Paris, 1994.
- Das Deutsche Jahrhundert Eine historische Bilanze, Stuttgart, 1996.
- "The Holocaust: Where We Are, Where We Need to Go" pages 23–29 from The Holocaust and History The Known, the Unknown, the Disputed and the Reexamined edited by Michael Berenbaum and Abraham Peck, Indiana University Press, 1998.

== See also ==
- List of Adolf Hitler books

== Sources ==
- Geras, Norman "In A Class of Its Own?" pages 25–56 from Moral Philosophy and the Holocaust edited by Eve Garrard & Geoffrey Scarre, London: Ashgate Publishing, 2003, ISBN 978-0-7546-1416-6.
- Hicks, A. H. Review of Dokumente. Band xxix. Die Schleswig-Frage seit 1945. Dokumente zur Rechtsstellung der Minderheiten beiderseits der deutschdanischen Grenze from International Affairs, Volume 36, Issue # 2, April 1960.
- Kautz, Fred The German Historians Hitler’s Willing Executioners and Daniel Goldhagen, Montreal: Black Rose Books, 2003, ISBN 1-55164-212-3
- Kelly, Reece Review of Hitlers Herrschaft. Vollzug einer Weltanschauung pages 516-517 from German Studies Review, Volume 11, Issue # 3, October 1988.
- Kershaw, Sir Ian The Nazi Dictatorship : Problems And Perspectives Of Interpretation London : Arnold; New York : Copublished in the USA by Oxford University Press, 2000.
- King, David Review of Hitler in History pages 172-173 from German Studies Review, Volume 9, Issue # 1 February 1986.
- Lukacs, John The Hitler of History, New York : A. A. Knopf, 1997.
- Rich, Norman Review of Hitler in History pages 1223-1224 from The American Historical Review, Volume 90, Issue # 5 December 1985.
