= Lord Valentine's Castle =

1980 novel by Robert Silverberg

- First edition cover art
- Author: Robert Silverberg
- Cover artist: Ron Walotsky
- Language: English
- Series: Majipoor series
- Release number: 1
- Genre: Fantasy
- Set in: Majipoor, a fictional planet
- Publisher: Harper & Row
- Publication place: United States
- Awards: Locus Award for Best Fantasy Novel
- Followed by: Majipoor Chronicles

Lord Valentine's Castle is a novel by Robert Silverberg published in 1980. It is the first entry in Silverberg's Majipoor series. The novel won the 1981 Locus Award for Best Fantasy Novel.

== Plot summary ==
The world of Majipoor is inhabited by several species, including humans. Most species live in harmony, although the indigenous shapeshifters, the Metamorphs, are viewed with distrust by other sentient people. The world has four rulers who work in tandem. These include the Coronal, the prime executive official; the Pontifex, always the previous Coronal; the Lady of Dreams, who sends good dreams and is always the mother of the Coronal; and the King of Dreams, who sends nightmares to control the population.

Valentine, a man with no memory, finds himself in the city of Pidruid. He meets Shanamir, a boy who teaches him about the world. Valentine also meets a troupe of jugglers comprising a group of four-armed Skandars, a Vroon sorcerer named Deliamber, a man named Sleet, and a woman named Carabella. The jugglers offer Valentine and Shanamir a place in their retinue. Carabella and Valentine become lovers.

Valentine has recurrent vivid dreams, which reveal his identity as the true Coronal. Valentine’s soul has been removed from his body, and the man in the Coronal’s body is a usurper: Dominin Barjazid, the son of the King of Dreams. Valentine decides to seek help from the Lady of Dreams, his mother.

As the troupe travels across Majipoor, their retinue grows. The troupe encounters many dangers, including ape-like Forest Brethren, carnivorous plants, attacks by Metamorphs, and a shipwreck caused by sea dragons. Eventually, the group reaches the Isle of Dreams. Valentine progresses through a series of spiritual tests in order to reach the Lady. He reunites with his mother. The Lady gives Valentine a magical circlet which restores his memories and allows him to influence the minds of others.

Next, he journeys to meet Pontifex Tyeveras. The Pontifex lives in the Labyrinth, an underground maze filled with bureaucratic government officials. Valentine eventually reaches Tyeveras, an elderly man kept alive by life support machines. Despite his frailty, Tyeveras pledges support to Valentine’s cause.

With the support of two of Majipoor’s ruling powers, Valentine raises an army and journeys towards Castle Mount. Atop the mountain is the castle where Dominin Barjazid rules as Coronal. Valentine’s army is victorious. Dominin, trapped in the castle, shuts off the atmospheric generators which supply heat and air despite the high elevation. This gambit endangers hundreds of millions of lives.

Valentine enters the castle, where he confronts and captures Dominin. He learns that the King of Dreams has been replaced by a Metamorph. The entire plot against the Coronal is revealed to be an attempt by the native Metamorphs at rebelling against their human-led government. The novel ends as Valentine reclaims his throne and the juggling troupe performs at the coronation.

== Reception ==
Lord Valentine's Castle won the Locus Award for Best Fantasy Novel in 1981, and was a Hugo Award nominee in 1981.

Greg Costikyan reviewed Lord Valentine's Castle in Ares Magazine #4 and commented that "despite the detail, despite the novel's dreamy pace, Silverberg never loses his reader, is never boring. To the contrary, Lord Valentine's Castle is, in the demeaning argot of Madison Avenue, a page-turner."

Kirkus Reviews states, "In terms of sf underpinnings, Majipoor is an inexcusably flimsy construct; and a large cast of promising characters is left rattling around the lengthy and plodding narrative in such a meagerly developed state as to resembled blighted peas in a pod. Disappointing."

Douglas Cohen for Tor.com said that "The story isn’t a puzzle, challenging readers to figure out whether this tale is science fiction or fantasy. It is science fantasy. It is a successful melding of both genres, as it borrows, tweaks, merges, and in some cases entirely reinvents. Books like Lord Valentine’s Castle seek to take the best of both genres and merge them into a seamless tale. Containing scientific and fantastical elements is both acceptable and expected."

Abroad, Krzysztof Sokołowski reviewed the book for Polish magazine Fantastyka (4/87, p. 55).

== Reviews ==
- Review by Algis Budrys (1980) in The Magazine of Fantasy & Science Fiction, May 1980
- Review by Melissa Mia Hall (1980) in Fantasy Newsletter, No. 25 June 1980
- Review by Baird Searles (1980) in Isaac Asimov's Science Fiction Magazine, July 1980
- Review by Tom Staicar (1980) in Amazing Stories, August 1980
- Review by Joseph Nicholas (1980) in Vector 99
- Review by Doug Fratz (1980) in Thrust, #15, Summer 1980
