= Don Leslie =

Don Leslie may refer to:

- Donald Leslie (1911–2004), American audio engineer
- Don Leslie (actor) (born 1948), actor and voice artist
