= Valentine Pontifex =

1983 novel by Robert Silverberg

Valentine Pontifex is a novel by Robert Silverberg published in 1983. It is part of the Majipoor series.

== Plot summary ==
Valentine Pontifex is a novel in which the Metamorphs try to drive people from their native world of Majipoor by spreading ecological hazards.

== Reception ==
Dave Langford reviewed Valentine Pontifex for White Dwarf #56, and stated that "Readers will remain in any agony of suspense unless they've cheated by reading the book's title. Not many surprises, then; but if you liked the previous two you probably won't be disappointed."

== Reviews ==
- Review by Debbie Notkin (1983) in Locus, #274 November 1983
- Review by Darrell Schweitzer (1984) in Science Fiction Review, Spring 1984
- Review [French] by Élisabeth Vonarburg (1984) in Solaris, #56
- Review by Ken Lake (1984) in Vector 122
- Review by Tom Easton (1985) in Analog Science Fiction/Science Fact, June 1985
