= Hitler's War =

1977 book by David Irving

- The front cover of the first edition in 1977
- Author: David Irving
- Language: English
- Subject: World War II
- Publisher: Viking Press
- Publication date: 1977
- Publication place: United States
- Media type: Print (hardcover)
- Pages: 926 (first edition)
- ISBN: 0-670-37412-1
- LC Class: D757

Hitler's War is a biographical book by the British author and Holocaust denier David Irving. It describes the Second World War from the point of view of Adolf Hitler, the dictator of Nazi Germany.

It was first published in April 1977 by Hodder & Stoughton and Viking Press. Avon Books reissued it in 1990. In 2002 Focal Point Publications published a revised illustrated edition, combined with Irving's The War Path, as a 1024-page hardcover.

Critical reception was mostly negative, with academics largely criticizing the book for historical negationism around Hitler's involvement in the Holocaust. Despite (or perhaps because of) the controversy Hitler's War generated, it was a best-seller in 1977. In particular, Hitler's War was a best-seller in Germany.

== Primary theses ==
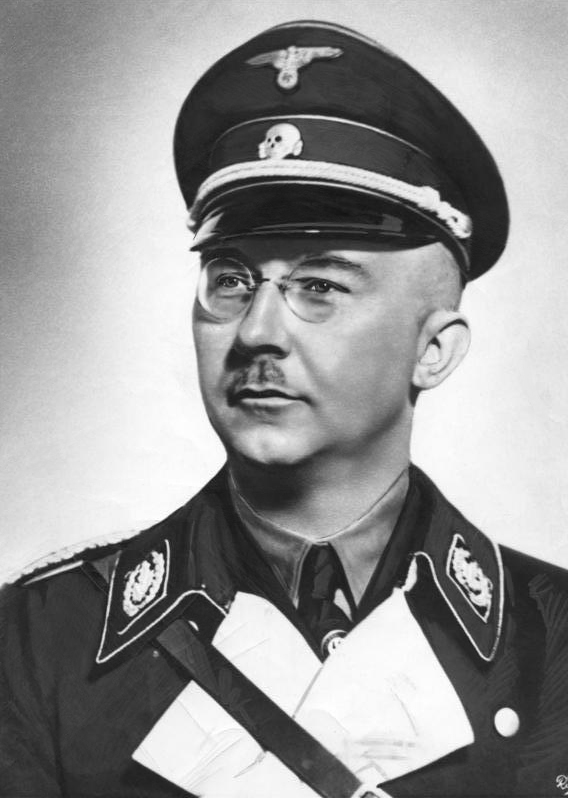
The Reichsführer-SS Heinrich Himmler. A note in Himmler's telephone log dated 30 November 1941 saying "no liquidation" was according to Irving proof that Hitler did not know about the Holocaust.

Irving's book Hitler's War, the first published installment of his two-part biography of Adolf Hitler (the prequel The War Path was published in 1978), had originally been published in German as Hitler und seine Feldherren (Hitler and his Generals) in 1975. Irving's intention in Hitler's War was to clean away the "years of grime and discolouration from the facade of a silent and forbidding monument" to reveal the “real Hitler”, whose reputation Irving claimed had been slandered by historians. In Hitler's War Irving tries to "view the situation as far as possible through Hitler's eyes, from behind his desk". He portrays Hitler as a rational and intelligent politician whose only goal was to increase Germany's prosperity and influence on the continent, and who was constantly let down by incompetent and/or treasonous subordinates. Irving's book faults the Allied leaders, most notably Winston Churchill, for the eventual escalation of war, and claims that the German invasion of the Soviet Union in 1941 was a "preventive war" forced on Hitler to avert an alleged impending Soviet attack. Irving comments that in light of the "preventive war" that he feels Hitler was forced to wage, the Kommissarbefehl was merely something that Stalin forced on Hitler. He also claims that Hitler had no knowledge of the Holocaust; while not outright denying its occurrence, Irving claims that Heinrich Himmler and his deputy, Reinhard Heydrich, were its originators and architects. Irving makes much of the lack of any written order from Hitler concerning the Holocaust (and for decades after the book's publication has offered to pay £1,000 to anyone who could find such an order). In addition, citing the work of such historians as Harry Elmer Barnes, David Hoggan, and Frederick J. P. Veale, Irving argues that Britain was primarily responsible for the outbreak of war in 1939.

Irving in his first edition of Hitler's War in 1977 argues that Hitler was against the mass killing of Jews. He claims that Hitler even ordered a stop to the extermination of Jews in November 1941 (the British historian Hugh Trevor-Roper stated that this admission contradicts Irving's other claim that Hitler was ignorant about the mass killing of Jews). On 30 November 1941 Heinrich Himmler went to the Wolf's Lair for a private conference with Hitler and during it the fate of some Berlin Jews was mentioned. At 1.30 pm Himmler was instructed to tell Reinhard Heydrich that the Jews were not to be liquidated. Himmler telephoned SS General Oswald Pohl, the overall chief of the concentration camp system, with the order: "Jews are to stay where they are." Irving argued that "No liquidation" (Keine Liquidierung) was "incontrovertible evidence" that Hitler ordered that no Jews were to be killed. However, although the telephone log is genuine, it provides no evidence that Hitler was involved at all, only that Himmler contacted Heydrich and there is no evidence that Hitler and Himmler were in contact before the phone call. This is an example of Irving's manipulation of documents since there was no general order to stop the killing of Jews. The German historian Eberhard Jäckel wrote that Irving "only ever sees and collects what fits his story, and even now he will not let himself be dissuaded from understanding what he wants to by the phrase postponement of the Jewish question’."

In a footnote in Hitler's War, Irving first introduced the thesis later popularised in the 1980s by Ernst Nolte that a letter written by Chaim Weizmann to Neville Chamberlain on 3 September 1939, pledging the support of the Jewish Agency to the Allied war effort, constituted a "Jewish declaration of war" against Germany, thus justifying German "internment" of European Jews. In 1975, when without Irving's permission the firm Ullstein-Verlag removed the passages claiming Hitler had no knowledge of the Holocaust from the German edition of Hitler's War, Irving sued Ullstein-Verlag. Despite his much-vaunted disdain for professional historians (most of whom Irving accused of slandering Hitler), Irving attended a historians' conference in Aschaffenburg in July 1978 to discuss "Hitler Today – Problems and Aspects of Hitler Research". Irving spent his time at the conference attacking all of the historians present for alleged sloppy research on Hitler, and promoting Hitler's War as the only good book ever written on the Führer.

Irving in his 1991 revised edition of Hitler's War removed all mentions of "gas chambers" and the word "Holocaust". He defended the revisions by stating, "You won't find the Holocaust mentioned in one line, not even in a footnote, why should [you]. If something didn't happen, then you don't even dignify it with a footnote."

The British historian Ian Kershaw wrote in his book The Nazi Dictatorship (1985) that although Irving's thesis of Hitler's ignorance of the Holocaust in Hitler's War was almost universally rejected by historians, his book was of value in that it provided a huge stimulus for further research on Hitler's role in the Holocaust (which had not been widely explored until then) as a way of rebutting Irving. By the time of Kershaw's fourth edition of The Nazi Dictatorship (2000), Kershaw described Irving as having engaged in provocations in the 1970s to provide an "exculpation of Hitler's role in the Final Solution".

== Reactions and criticism ==
Critical reception of Hitler's War was mostly negative. Various historians such as Richard J. Evans, Gitta Sereny, Martin Broszat, Lucy Dawidowicz, Gerard Fleming, Charles W. Sydnor, and Eberhard Jäckel wrote articles and books rebutting erroneous information in Hitler's War. Writing in The Sunday Times, Sereny called Irving's work "closer to theology or mythology" than history, while Broszat labelled Irving a "Hitler partisan wearing blinkers". Lance Morrow wrote in Time that Irving's picture of the "Führer as a somewhat harried business executive too preoccupied to know exactly what was happening in his branch offices at Auschwitz and Treblinka" was hard to accept. In an article published in The Sunday Times under the title "The £1,000 Question" on 10 July 1977, Sereny and the journalist Lewis Chester examined Irving's sources and found significant differences from what Irving published in Hitler's War. In particular, while interviewing one of Irving's primary informants, Otto Günsche, the latter stated that "one must assume that he [Hitler] did know" about the Holocaust.

Some historians, such as John Keegan and Hugh Trevor-Roper, praised the book as well written and well researched – although they disputed Irving's claim that Hitler had no knowledge of the Holocaust, and Trevor-Roper was strongly critical of Irving's repeating the "stale and exploded libel" about Churchill ordering the "assassination" of General Sikorski. Keegan wrote that Hitler's War was "Irving's greatest achievement... indispensable to anyone seeking to understand the war in the round".

=== Hugh Trevor-Roper ===
Trevor-Roper's praise was circumspect. Trevor-Roper commended Irving's "indefatigable, scholarly industry" and wrote "I have enjoyed reading his long work from beginning to end", but he also went on to note that many of the conclusions Irving drew were not supported by the evidence. Trevor-Roper objected to Irving's argument that one entry from Heinrich Himmler's phone log on 30 November 1941, ordering Heydrich to ensure that one train transport of German Jews to Latvia not be executed on arrival, proved that Hitler was opposed to genocide. Trevor-Roper argued that the message concerned only the people aboard that particular train and was not about all the Jews in Europe. (Irving, claiming to have misread the original source document as referring to transportation generally, rather than a specific train, later accepted that his reading of the message was wrong and that it actually referred to a single trainload out of Berlin.) Trevor-Roper noted the contradiction in Irving's argument, based on the assumption that it was Hitler who ordered Himmler to spare the people aboard that train and the claim that Hitler was unaware in the fall of 1941 that the SS were rounding up German and Czech Jews to be sent to be shot in Eastern Europe (the first gassings via gas vans started on 8 December 1941). Trevor-Roper commented about Irving's claim that Hitler was unaware of the mass murders of Jews carried out by the SS while at the same time intervening to save Jewish lives that: "One does not veto an action unless one thinks that it is otherwise likely to occur". Finally, Trevor-Roper complained about Irving's "consistent bias" for Hitler and that "Mr. Irving's sympathies can hardly be doubted".

=== Alan Bullock ===
The British historian Alan Bullock writing in The New York Review of Books on 26 May 1977 dismissed Irving's depiction of Hitler as a leader too busy with the war to notice the Holocaust as contrary to all of the historical evidence.

=== Eberhard Jäckel ===
The German historian Eberhard Jäckel wrote a series of newspaper articles later turned into the book David Irving's Hitler: A Faulty History Dissected, attacking Irving and maintaining that Hitler was very much aware of and approved of the Holocaust. Jäckel attacked Irving for claiming that a note from Heinrich Himmler's notebook – "Jewish transport from Berlin, not to be liquidated", dated 30 November 1941 – proved that Hitler did not want to see the Holocaust happen. Jäckel maintained that the order referred only to that train (a claim which, as noted above, Irving later accepted), and argued that if Hitler had ordered the people on that train to be spared, it must stand to reason that he was aware of the Holocaust. Jäckel went on to argue that because the "Final Solution" was secret, it is not surprising that Hitler's servants were ignorant of the Holocaust, and that anyhow, five of Hitler's servants interviewed by Irving later claimed that they believed that Hitler was aware of the Holocaust. Jäckel argued on the basis of Hitler's statements in Mein Kampf that it was a reasonable assumption he was committed to the genocide of the Jews because Hitler had attempted to execute the foreign policy he had outlined, which in Jäckel's opinion disproves Irving's claim that Hitler was unaware of the Shoah. Jäckel used Hitler's tendency to involve himself in minutiae to argue that it is simply inconceivable that Hitler was unaware of the Holocaust. As evidence against Irving, Jäckel used the "prophecy" made in Hitler's 30 January 1939 Reichstag speech, when Hitler declared:

I shall once again be your prophet: if international Jewry with its financial power in and outside of Europe should manage once more to draw the peoples of the world into world war, then the result will not be the Bolshevization of the world, and thus the victory of Jewry, but rather the total destruction of the Jewish race in Europe.

Likewise, Jäckel used Himmler's Posen speeches of 1943 and certain other statements on his part in 1944 referring to an "order" from an unnamed higher authority as proof that Hitler had ordered the Holocaust. In the same way, Jäckel used Hitler's order of 13 March 1941, ordering that the Einsatzgruppen be reestablished for Operation Barbarossa, as proof of the Führer's involvement in the Holocaust. Jäckel also cited the entry in Joseph Goebbels's diary on 27 March 1942 – mentioning that the Führer's "prophecy" of 1939 was coming true – as a sign that Hitler had ordered the Holocaust, and accused Irving of dishonesty in claiming that there was no sign in the Goebbels's diary that Hitler knew of the Holocaust. Finally, Jäckel noted the frequent references to the "prophecy" in Hitler's wartime speeches as a sign that Hitler had ordered the Holocaust, thereby disproving Irving's claim that Hitler was ignorant of the "Final Solution".

In response to Jäckel's first article, Irving announced that he had seen a document from 1942 proving that Hitler had ordered the Holocaust not to occur, but that the document was now "lost". Jäckel wrote that he had "easily" discovered the "lost" document, in which the head of the Reich Chancellery, Hans Lammers, wrote to the Justice Minister Franz Schlegelberger that Hitler ordered him to put the "Jewish Question" on the "back-burner" until after the war. Jäckel noted the document concerned was the result of a meeting between Lammers and Schlegelberger on 10 April 1942 concerning amendments to the divorce law concerning German Jews and Mischlinge. Jäckel commented that in 1942, there was a division of labour between the representatives of the Rechtsstaat (Law State) and the Polizeistaat (Police State) in Nazi Germany. Jäckel argued that for the representatives of the Rechtsstaat like the Ministry of Justice, the "Final Solution" was a bureaucratic process to deprive Jews of their civil rights and to isolate them, whereas for representatives of Polizeistaat like the SS, the "Final Solution" was genocide. Jäckel argued that Hitler's order to Lammers to tell Schlegelberger to wait until after the war before concerning him about the "impracticable" details of the divorce laws between German Jews and "Aryans" was simply Hitler's way of putting Schlegelberger off. Jäckel maintained that since Hitler expected to win the war, and to complete the "Final Solution to the Jewish Question" by killing every single Jew in the world, Hitler would have had no interest in amending the divorce law to make it easier for those in mixed marriages to divorce their Jewish or Mischlinge spouses. Moreover, Jäckel noted that Hitler disliked dealing with the officials of the Justice Ministry, and Schlegelberger in particular. Hitler was to sack him as Justice Minister later in 1942, so it was understandable that Hitler would not want to see Schlegelberger. Jäckel ended his essay arguing that the "lost" document in no way proved that Hitler was unaware of the Holocaust, and accused Irving of deceitfulness in claiming otherwise.

=== John Lukacs ===
The American historian John Lukacs in a very unfavourable book review in the edition of 19 August 1977 of National Review called Hitler's War a worthless book, while Walter Laqueur, when reviewing Hitler's War in The New York Times Book Review of 3 April 1977, accused Irving of selective use of the historical record in Hitler's favour. Laqueur argued that Hitler's War read more like a legal brief written by a defence lawyer who was attempting to exonerate Hitler before the judgement of history, than a historical work.

Lukacs called Irving an "amateur historian" whose determination to defend Hitler had resulted in an "appalling" book. Lukacs complimented Irving's industry in tracking down hundreds of people who knew Hitler, but went on to note personal recollections are not always the best historical source, and that Irving manufactured battles; for instance, crediting Field Marshal Ferdinand Schörner with a victory in April 1945 against the Red Army for the control of Ostrava, a battle which did not, in fact, take place. Lukacs took issue with Irving's language, which he described as conveying moral judgements that were not supported by the facts. Lukacs was very critical of Irving's claims that Poland had planned to invade Germany in 1939 and likewise, that the Soviet Union was on the verge of attacking the Reich in 1941, in both cases justifying German "preventative wars" against those states.

=== Martin Broszat ===
In an article first published in the Vierteljahrshefte für Zeitgeschichte journal in 1977, Martin Broszat wrote that:

"He [Irving] is too eager to accept authenticity for objectivity, is overly hasty in interpreting superficial diagnoses and often seems insufficiently interested in complex historical interconnections and in structural problems that transcend the mere recording of historical facts, but are essential for their evaluation".

Broszat argued that in writing Hitler's War, Irving was too concerned with the "antechamber aspects" of Hitler's headquarters, and accused Irving of distorting historical facts in Hitler's favour. Broszat complained that Irving was focused too much on military events at the expense of the broader political context of the war, and that he had offered false interpretations such as accepting at face value the Nazi claim that the Action T4 "euthanasia" program was launched in September 1939 to free up hospital spaces for wounded German soldiers, when in fact the program was launched in January 1939.

In particular, Broszat criticised Irving's claim that because of one telephone note written by Himmler stating "No liquidation" in regards to a train transport of German Jews passing through Berlin to Riga (whom the SS intended to have all shot upon arrival) on 30 November 1941 that this proved that Hitler did not want to see the Holocaust happen. Broszat argued that this was not proof that Hitler had given any such order to Himmler to stop the killings of Jews, but rather that the comment "No liquidation" referred only to that particular train, and was mostly likely related to concerns about questions American reporters were asking about the fate of German Jews being sent to Eastern Europe. Broszat questioned whether Hitler had given Himmler any order about the train, given that the phone call Himmler made from the Wolfsschanze to Heydrich in Prague took place at about 11:30 a.m., and the records show that Hitler did not get up until about 2:00 p.m. on 30 November 1941.

Likewise, Broszat criticised Irving for accepting the "fantastic" claims of the SS Obergruppenführer Karl Wolff that he did not know about the Holocaust (Irving's argument was that if Wolff did not know about the Holocaust, how could Hitler have known), despite the fact that Wolff was convicted of war crimes in 1963 on the basis of documentary evidence implicating him in the Holocaust. Broszat accused Irving of seeking to generate a highly misleading impression of a conference between Hitler and the Hungarian Regent, Admiral Miklós Horthy in April 1943 by re-arranging the words to make Hitler appear less brutally anti-Semitic than what the original notes showed. Along the same lines, Broszat maintained that the picture of World War II drawn by Irving was done in such a way to engage in moral equivalence between the actions of the Axis and Allied states, leading to Hitler's "fanatical, destructive will to annihilate" being downgraded to being "...no longer an exceptional phenomenon". The criticism by Broszat was considered to be especially damaging to Irving because Broszat had based his critique largely by examining the same primary sources Irving had used for Hitler's War.

=== Charles Sydnor ===
Another equally scathing review was published by the American historian Charles Sydnor who argued that Hitler's War was marred by Irving's efforts to present Hitler in the most favourable light possible. Sydnor commented that Irving wrongly and bizarrely presented SS massacres in Poland in September 1939 as the legitimate response to the British rejection of Hitler's peace offer of October 1939, and that Irving seemed to imply that Hitler's anti-Semitism was justified by the Anglo-American strategic bombing offensive against German cities. Sydnor noted numerous errors in Hitler's War such as Irving's claim that Andreas Hofer was shot by the French in 1923 for opposing the French occupation of the Ruhr (Irving probably had Albert Leo Schlageter in mind), and that the 1945 film Kolberg, which dealt with the theme of a Prussian fortress besieged by the French in 1806, was set in the Seven Years' War, while it was actually set during the Napoleonic Wars. Sydnor also speculated about just what motivated the East German government to allow Irving entry into the German Democratic Republic to search for information about Hitler, commenting "That the East Germans assisted Mr. Irving in an effort that would culminate in a revisionist interpretation of Hitler is a fact of real interest – and some amusement if one speculates on the question of who may have been taken in by whom."

Sydnor was highly critical of Irving's unreferenced statement that the Jews who fought in the Warsaw Ghetto Uprising of 1943 were well supplied with weapons from Germany's allies. In the same light, concerning Irving's claim that Hitler was ignorant of the Holocaust prior to October 1943, Sydnor commented that Hitler had received a SS report in November 1942 which contained a mention of 363,211 Russian Jews executed by the Einsatzgruppen between August–November 1942. Similarly, Sydnor charged Irving with misquotation such as having Hitler say on 25 October 1941 "with the Jews too I've found myself remaining inactive", thereby implying that Hitler wanted to be "inactive" against the Jews for the rest of the war, when the documents show Hitler's remarks to be "Even with regard to the Jews I've found myself remaining inactive", and that Hitler's remark was referring to the past when Hitler was criticising himself for his past "inactivity" against the Jews.

Likewise, Sydnor argued that Irving's statement that all previous Hitler biographies were compromised by their hostility towards der Führer is not supported by an examination of said biographies. Sydnor remarked that Irving's statement that the Einsatzgruppen were in charge in the death camps seems to indicate that he was not familiar with the history of the Holocaust as the Einsatzgruppen were in fact mobile death squads who had nothing to do with the death camps. Moreover, Syndnor noted that Irving falsely claimed that the Einsatzgruppen operating in Poland in 1939 were under the authority of SS General Udo von Woyrsch, when in fact the Einsatzgruppen were divided into two groups, one of which reported to Heydrich and another to Theodor Eicke (General Woyrsch commanded a group reporting to Heydrich). Sydnor commented acidly in light of Irving's claim of Hitler's ignorance of the massacres of Poles that Eicke commanded Einsatzgruppe III and the SS Death's Head Regiment Brandenburg during the Polish campaign from Hitler's headquarters train "Amerika".

Continuing on the theme of the Einsatzgruppen, Sydnor criticised Irving for his statement that the Babi Yar massacre of September 1941 was the first massacre carried out by the Einsatzgruppen in 1941, when in fact the Einsatzgruppen had been staging massacres of Soviet Jews since the beginning of Operation Barbarossa in June 1941. Sydnor charged Irving with offering a false interpretation of Hitler's reaction to Konrad Morgen's report of October 1944 about widespread corruption in the SS as marking Hitler's moral outrage at the Holocaust; Sydnor asserted that Hitler's outrage had nothing to do with the murder of the Jews, and everything to do with the revelation of SS corruption. Concerning Irving's claim that General Friedrich Olbricht was engaged in an orgy on the night of 20 July 1944 in reaction to the news of Hitler's apparent assassination, Sydnor noted that Irving does not explain how General Olbricht could have been directing a putsch at the Bendlerblock on the night of 20 July while at the same time engaging in an orgy at his home. Sydnor accused Irving of selective quotation from the memoirs of Joachim von Ribbentrop, noting that Irving quoted the passage: "How things came to the destruction of the Jews, I just don't know...But that he [Hitler] ordered it, I refuse to believe, because such an act would be wholly incompatible with the picture I always had of him", but did not quote the next sentence where Ribbentrop wrote: "On the other hand, judging from his [Hitler's] last will, one must suppose that he at least knew about it, if, in his fanaticism against the Jews, he didn't also order it". Finally, Sydnor argued that Irving's account of the final days of Hitler appeared to comprise little more than a rehashing of Hugh Trevor-Roper's 1947 book, The Last Days of Hitler, only with Hitler as an object of sympathy, rather than scorn.

=== Lucy Dawidowicz ===
In her 1981 book The Holocaust and Historians, the American historian Lucy Dawidowicz called Irving an apologist for the Third Reich with minimal scholarly standards. Dawidowicz wrote that she believed that the term revisionist was inappropriate for Irving because revisionism is a legitimate historical method whereas Irving was not entitled to call himself a historian, revisionist or otherwise, and only deserved the label apologist. Dawidowicz maintained that the "No liquidation" message in Himmler's phone log refers not to the German Jews being deported to be shot in Riga, but rather to a Dr. Jekelius, whom Himmler believed to be the son of Soviet Foreign Commissar Vyacheslav Molotov, who was also travelling on that train, and whom Himmler wanted to see arrested, but not executed.

=== Gordon A. Craig ===
The Scottish-American historian Gordon A. Craig complained of Irving's double standard in Hitler's War of crediting all of the German victories to the Führer while blaming all of the German defeats in the war on Hitler's allegedly unworthy and incompetent generals. Craig wrote that in his opinion some of Irving's language was inappropriate, such as Irving's remark that "Hitler was cheated of the ultimate winter victory", and that Irving totally ignored Hitler's own incompetence as a military leader. Craig charged that it was simply wrong on the part of Irving to write that Hitler in October 1941 was in a state of pain over German losses on the Eastern Front with Hitler supposedly thinking "What would be left of Germany and the flower of her manhood?" As a way of rebuttal to this picture of Hitler, Craig quoted Hitler's remark later in 1941 when told of heavy German losses, "But that's what the young people are there for!". Like many other historians, Craig was critical of Irving using the "no liquidation" comment in Himmler's telephone logbook from 30 November 1941 to prove that Hitler was opposed to the Holocaust. Citing Lucy Dawidowicz, Craig argued the phrase "no liquidation" referred only to Dr. Jekelius. Finally, to prove that Hitler was aware of the Holocaust, Craig quoted Hitler's remark to the Czechoslovak foreign minister in January 1939 that "We are going to destroy the Jews!...The day of reckoning has come!" plus the broad hints that Hitler dropped in his speeches of 30 January 1941; 30 January 1942; 24 February 1942; 30 September 1942, and 8 November 1942 that he knew of the Holocaust. Finally, Craig cited Himmler's remark of May 1944 where he stated he had orders from an unnamed higher authority (who Craig argued could only be Hitler) for the "Final Solution."

=== Gill Siedel ===
The American author Gill Seidel summed up the appeal of Hitler's War to Germans as:

It is not difficult to explain its appeal. The argument of the book may be summed up as: "If only the Führer had known about the murder of the Jews, he would had stopped it'. For...Germans who do not want to face up to the past, it was easy to be persuaded that if Hitler did not know, then neither did the person on the street.

== See also ==
- Churchill, Hitler and the Unnecessary War
- List of books by or about Adolf Hitler
- Irving v Penguin Books Ltd
