= Churchill, Hitler, and the Unnecessary War =

2008 book by Pat Buchanan

- Author: Patrick J. Buchanan
- Language: English
- Subject: Winston Churchill
- Publisher: Crown
- Publication date: 2008
- Publication place: United States
- Media type: Print
- Pages: 544
- ISBN: 978-0-307-40515-9

Churchill, Hitler, and the Unnecessary War: How Britain Lost Its Empire and the West Lost the World by Patrick J. Buchanan was published in May 2008 and examines British imperial decisions in both World War I and World War II. Buchanan particularly focuses on the role of Winston Churchill.

== Reviews ==
Canadian journalist Eric Margolis described Buchanan's book a "powerful new book" and "strips away lingering war propaganda and shows the cynicism, lust for power, and foolishness of the 'saintly' Allied war leaders and their 'good' war".

American writer Adam Kirsch in The New York Sun criticizes the book as "a clear demonstration of the way ideological extremes tend to converge" and says Buchanan "deploys a rhetoric of violence and treason more redolent of the German right in the Weimar period than of anything in the American conservative tradition". Kirsch further says the book relies more on historian than scholarly journals or archives.

David Bahnsen said the book "should be avoided like the plague" and is an "anti-semitic piece of garbage".

Historian John Lukacs writing for The American Conservative, called Buchanan's arguments "stamped by what we might call selective indignation or, more accurately, special pleading". Lukacs also comments on Buchanan's vastly different views on the British Empire, saying there was no evidence of any sort of affection towards the empire until this book.

Christopher Hitchens from Newsweek says the undesirability of coexisting with Hitler and impossibility to work with the German Reich should be considered and a book that tries to separate it "is likely to result in a book that stinks", referencing the book itself.

== See also ==
- John Charmley
- The Death of the West
- Hitler's War
- Allies at War by Tim Bouverie (2025)
- The Second World War by Antony Beevor (2012).
- Inferno: The World at War, 1939-1945 by Max Hastings (2011).
- The Storm of War by Andrew Roberts (2009).
