= Sym-Bionic Titan =

Animated science-fiction television series

- Genre: Action-adventure; Science fiction; Mecha
- Created by: Genndy Tartakovsky; Bryan Andrews; Paul Rudish
- Directed by: Genndy Tartakovsky
- Voices of: Kevin Thoms; Tara Strong; Brian Posehn; Don Leslie; John DiMaggio; Tim Russ; Kari Wahlgren
- Theme music composer: Tyler Bates
- Composers: Tyler Bates; Dieter Hartmann and Timothy Williams (additional music)
- Country of origin: United States
- Original language: English
- No. of seasons: 1
- No. of episodes: 20 (+1 unaired pilot)

Production
- Executive producers: Brian A. Miller; Jennifer Pelphrey; Tramm Wigzell; Rob Swartz; Rob Sorcher; Genndy Tartakovsky
- Producer: Shareena Carlson
- Running time: 22 minutes
- Production companies: Orphanage Animation Studios; Cartoon Network Studios

Original release
- Network: Cartoon Network
- Release: September 17, 2010 – April 9, 2011

Sym-Bionic Titan is an American animated television series created by Genndy Tartakovsky (in his fourth collaboration with the channel), Bryan Andrews and Paul Rudish for Cartoon Network. The series focuses on a trio consisting of the alien princess Ilana, the strict but rebellious alien soldier Lance, and the robot Octus, who arrive on Earth and combine themselves to create the titular Sym-Bionic Titan.

A preview of the series was first shown at the 2009 San Diego Comic-Con, and further details were revealed at Cartoon Network's 2010 upfront. The series premiered on September 17, 2010, and ended on April 9, 2011, with a total of 20 episodes as ordered by the channel; Tartakovsky had hoped to expand on that, but the series was not renewed for a second season, as it "did not have any toys connected to it".

While Sym-Bionic Titan has never been released to DVD in the United States, all 20 episodes were available for purchase on iTunes and the Microsoft Store. On October 7, 2012, reruns of the series began airing on Adult Swim's Toonami block along with the 2011 television series of ThunderCats until Cartoon Network wrote-off Sym-Bionic Titan for financial reasons in September 2014. The series was later released on Netflix in 2019, but was removed from the service in December 2020.

== Premise ==
Billed as "an exciting hybrid of high school drama and giant robot battles", Sym-Bionic Titan features "the adventures of three beings from the planet Galaluna who crash-land on Earth while attempting to escape their war-torn world". The series follows the lives of Lance (voiced by Kevin Thoms), Ilana (voiced by Tara Strong) and Octus (voiced by Brian Posehn), two alien teenagers and a robot respectively in the form of humanoids living on Earth, an "identical" planet to Galaluna, while fleeing an evil general who has taken over their home planet with the help of monstrous creatures called Mutraddi.

Ilana is the princess of the Galalunan royal family, Lance is a dark-hearted but capable soldier and Octus is a bio-cybernetic robot created by Ilana's father to protect her: all three having to now pose as normal high school students to blend into everyday life in Sherman, Illinois so Lance and Octus can conceal Ilana from General Modula (Don Leslie) and his hideous space mutants sent to kill the sole heir of Galaluna and complete his conquest.

When called into battle, the Galalunans are outfitted with individual armor that provides more than ample protection. It is when the gravest of danger appears that Octus activates the sym-bionic defense program and he, Ilana, and Lance unite "Heart (Ilana), Body (Lance) and Mind (Octus)" and come together to form the spectacular cyber-giant, Sym-Bionic Titan.

== Episodes ==
No.	Title	Animation direction by	Written by	Storyboard by	Original release date	US viewers (millions)
1	"Escape to Sherman High"	Genndy Tartakovsky and Jeong, Yu Mun	Bryan Andrews, Paul Rudish, and Genndy Tartakovsky; Darrick Bachman and Marv Wolfman (additionals)	Bryan Andrews and Genndy Tartakovsky	September 17, 2010	1.73
Lance, Ilana, and Octus, two alien humanoid teenagers and a robot, crash-land on Earth while fleeing the evil General Modula, who has conquered their home world, Galaluna. They try to blend in with Earth society by going to high school at the nearby town of Sherman, Illinois. During their first day at school, Modula sends a fire monster to destroy the princess. While battling the beast, Lance, Ilana, and Octus form "Sym-Bionic Titan" with their robotically enhanced and energized battle-suits and defeat the monster, with some help from the mysterious Solomon.
2	"Neighbors in Disguise"	Randy Myers and Koh, Jae Bong	Darrick Bachman; Amy Wolfram (additional)	Sung Jin Ahn, Ricardo Delgado, and Rafael Rosado	September 24, 2010	1.54
Ilana visits the mall to buy furniture for their new home, but Lance sees everyone around them as enemies, leading to a confrontation with mall security. Lance activates his powered Manus armored suit in Ilana's defense, attracting the attention of a five-headed robot beast sent by Modula. Lance tries to redeem himself for the mess he has caused by being swallowed so that he can destroy the beast's power core from within. Later, Solomon takes security footage of Lance transforming into a titan.
3	"Elephant Logic"	Rob Renzetti and Jeong, Yu Mun	Ricardo Delgado and Genndy Tartakovsky	Brian Larsen, Kelsey Mann, and Andy Suriano	October 1, 2010	N/A
Ilana and Lance are having a hard time working as a team, so Octus consults children's television in an attempt to find a solution. Meanwhile, General Steel comes into possession of a mysterious rock. In his rush to uncover its secrets, he unleashes the monster within, a massive, electrical storm creature. Taking advice from the shows he's been watching, Octus gets Ilana and Lance to work together to defeat the storm creature of electricity.
4	"The Phantom Ninja"	Robert Alvarez and Koh, Jae Bong	Darrick Bachman	Sung Jin Ahn, Ricardo Delgado, and Genndy Tartakovsky	October 8, 2010	1.31
Modula sends a squid-like Mutraddi assassin named Xeexi to find Ilana and kill her and the "other two." Meanwhile, Lance takes up vigilantism to spice up his boring life. One fight forces Lance to turn on his armor which enables Xeexi to capture him. Xeexi then finds Ilana and is about to kill her when Lance breaks free and saves her. Though Xeexi is defeated, knowledge of Titan's existence reaches Modula. He shows the King a hologram of the gigantic robot, insisting that he tell Modula everything he knows about it, much to the King's shock.
5	"Roar of the White Dragon"	Robert Alvarez and Jeong, Yu Mun	Mitch Larson	Kelsey Mann, Rafael Rosado, and Andy Suriano	October 15, 2010	1.85
Lance develops a rivalry with a street-racing gang leader named Mike Chan, also called the White Dragon. When Lance's rivalry gets him arrested, Ilana forces him to get a driver's license – legally – if he wants to race Chan again. During the test, he is harassed first by Chan's gang, then by a long-limbed Mutraddi monster. Lance manages to escape the monster and his instructor passes him in gratitude. Lance, Ilana, and Octus defeat the monster and Chan is taken into police custody by a detective who was trying to catch him.
6	"Shaman of Fear"	Brian Sheesley, Genndy Tartakovsky and Koh, Jae Bong	Genndy Tartakovsky	Sung Jin Ahn, Ricardo Delgado, and Henry Yu	October 22, 2010	1.59
Ilana and Lance suffer from nightmares induced by a shaman-like Mutraddi who preys upon their fears. Ilana sees visions of her people dying, while Lance relives the experiment which claimed his father's life. They face and overcome their fears to beat the shaman and, upon returning home, both Ilana and Lance begin to have a new outlook on their mission on Earth.
7	"Showdown at Sherman High"	Robert Alvarez and Jeong, Yu Mun	Darrick Bachman	Dave Chlystek, Andy Suriano, and Genndy Tartakovsky	October 29, 2010	1.59
Using Sym-Bionic Titan, the group defeats a Mutraddi blob monster; however, a small piece survives and follows them to school, where it reassembles itself and attacks while they are vulnerable. The creature engulfs the school taking the whole student body prisoner. While Lance and Ilana fight for their lives and the other students, Octus has to devise a means to defeat the creature – which turns out to be cellphone signals via hypersonic waves.
8	"Shadows of Youth"	Robert Alvarez, R. Michel Lyman and Jeong, Yu Mun	Paul Dini	Sung Jin Ahn, Ricardo Delgado, and Sahin Ersöz	November 5, 2010	1.91
Lance has memory flashes to his time at the Galalunian military academy as a child shortly after the disappearance of his father. While at the academy, he is tormented by the school bully trio led by the malicious Baron, yet proves he is better than the other students by achieving the Medal of Excellence. As a result, Baron and his friends plot revenge by trying to kill Lance and end up destroying the school, only for the poor latter to take the fall and end up having to repair the school over the summer.
9	"Tashy 497"	Robert Alvarez, Larry Leichliter, Kevin Petrilak and Koh, Jae Bong	Genndy Tartakovsky	Dave Bullock, Andy Suriano, and Henry Yu	November 12, 2010	1.57
When Modula finds a cute but deadly new alien made of slime to unleash upon the group, Lance, Ilana, and Octus find the cuddly little alien and decide to keep it as a pet. However, they soon discover that the cute creature isn't what it seems. The creature is generating enough energy to wipe out Earth, so the trio reluctantly let their beloved pet destroy itself peacefully in a glorious burst of energy. At an astronomy center, Octus locates a nebula cluster where they let their pet go, which the scientist of the station allows them to name for discovering it. In agreement, they come to name the cloud Tashy 497, as a mix of the names they wanted to name the creature.
10	"Lessons in Love"	Robert Alvarez, Larry Leichliter and Jeong, Yu Mun	Darrick Bachman	Dave Bullock, Andy Suriano, and Henry Yu	November 19, 2010	1.67
When Kimmy the head cheerleader comes over to study, she becomes romantically infatuated with Octus' human student disguise. Meanwhile, Lance and Ilana encounter a manta-like Mutraddi creature that absorbs electrical energy, causing their armor activators/communicators to shut down.
11	"The Fortress of Deception"	Jeff Hall, Larry Leichliter, Genndy Tartakovsky and Koh, Jae Bong	Mitch Larson	Bob Camp, Ricardo Delgado, and Sung Jin Ahn	December 3, 2010	1.61
When Lance and Ilana are captured by G3 (Galactic Guardian Group), Octus has to discover the location of their base. Meanwhile, Ilana and Lance are locked up in a Galalunian-style cell at the G3 base. When Lance is taken in to be interrogated, Ilana meets a seeming fellow prisoner; Lance takes a beating from his interrogator, but breaks out to get Ilana. They all hasten to escape and, after being reunited with their communicators and Octus, they form Titan and break free.
12	"The Ballad of Scary Mary"	Robert Alvarez, Rob Renzetti, Larry Leichliter and Jeong, Yu Mun	Darrick Bachman	Genndy Tartakovsky, Sung Jin Ahn, and Ricardo Delgado	February 2, 2011	N/A
Octus and Kimmy drag Ilana and Lance with them to an annual school event in the woods known as a "Scary Mary" party, named after an unpopular girl who ran into those woods after being the victim of a horrible prank and was never seen again. Lance and Ilana are very reluctant to join in the fun, but after Ilana sees a geekish boy named Jason trying to open a bottle, she decides to go and talk to him. Lance does not feel the party vibe, so he chooses to hang out beside the van, until a Goth girl named Kristin shows up and they begin talking. While Octus, Kimmy, and some of her friends start doing "The Robot," a shape shifting Mutraddi beast lands near the party. The shape shifter disguises itself as Jason and tries to kill Ilana, only to be stopped by Lance. When it shows its true form to the rest of the kids at the party, they all run, giving Lance, Ilana, and Octus time to form Sym-Bionic Titan and kill it. In the final scene, a flashback reveals that Mary did not die but instead ran away with a biker who took pity on her.
13	"The Demon Within"	Robert Alvarez, Larry Leichliter, Brian Sheesley and Yoon, Sung Wook	Don Shank	Sung Jin Ahn, Ricardo Delgado, and Brian Larsen	February 9, 2011	N/A
Lance, Ilana, and Octus go deep into the swamp to find a Mutraddi that has landed in the water. They investigate the crashed ship and are attacked by an amphibian-like Mutraddi that, after a seemingly easy kill, is able to bite Ilana and escape. Very slowly she transforms into the creature and attacks an alligator that was also mutated. Lance and Octus kill the original Mutraddi beast, turning Ilana back to herself.
14	"I Am Octus"	Robert Alvarez, Larry Leichliter and Yoon, Sung Wook	J. M. DeMatteis	Andy Suriano, Henry Yu, and Dave Bullock	February 16, 2011	N/A
As the world seems to come to an absolute standstill, Octus remains immune and tries to find the cause for the problem. He is also forced to figure out what exactly he is. Once Octus finds the source, a giant bat Mutraddi that uses radio waves to stop all organic beings from moving, he attacks it, freeing Lance and Ilana. Now free, they form Sym-Bionic Titan with Octus and easily destroy the beast.
15	"Disenfranchised"	Robert Alvarez, John McIntyre and Koh, Jae Bong	James Gomez	Andy Suriano, Henry Yu, and Dave Bullock	March 2, 2011	N/A
Lance learns how to play the guitar, and General Steel sends a spy to Sherman High, convinced that whoever is behind Titan is at the school and Lance, Ilana and Octus become Steel's prime suspects. A dragon-like Mutraddi, which was defeated earlier by Titan, comes back as a severed head during a concert but is destroyed by Ilana and Octus with a hologram of the Manus armor, to give Lance an alibi with the General being at the concert.
16	"Escape from Galaluna"	Robert Alvarez and Koh, Jae Bong	Bryan Andrews and Mitch Larson	Sung Jin Ahn, Bryan Andrews, and Ricardo Delgado	March 9, 2011	N/A
Another flashback episode showing the invasion of Mutraddi on Galaluna and Ilana, Lance, and Octus's escape. Ilana attends the opening of a school in a tribal region of Galaluna with her guardian, Hobbes. Meanwhile, Lance goes on a mission to rescue hostages from an observatory. His commander tells him to return to his post, but sneaks into the observatory as the Mudtradi Leader was talking to Modula (unbeknownst to Lance) and Lance was imprisoned for getting the hostages killed (even though they were dead beforehand). Meanwhile, the King (Voiced by John DiMaggio) is seen finishing building Octus. The invasion occurs and Hobbes is injured and returns Ilana to the palace with both of them alive, and Lance's commander is revealed to be a traitor for Modula. Lance kills his former commander after a long sword fight, taking the commander's armor activator. The King tasks Lance with protecting Ilana and gives them Octus to aid them further. They launch and the trio later arrived on planet Earth in the first episode.
17	"Under the Three Moons"	Robert Alvarez, Larry Leichliter and Jeong, Yu Mun	Darrick Bachman	Andy Suriano and Henry Yu	March 16, 2011	N/A
Ilana is homesick, so she joins the Homecoming Dance Committee and creates a Galalunian-themed dance. Meanwhile, General Modula's continued failure to destroy the princess is spreading across the galaxy. Modula is approached by an alien who guarantees on his own life that he has a creature that will destroy Ilana and crush the Galalunian People's spirit. As our three heroes try to prepare for the dance, Lance and Kristin go a little further in their romantic relationship with a karate bout, but she declines his request to join him at the dance. Issues arise when the creature arrives just as they are about to depart for the dance. Titan at first fails poorly, as Octus and Ilana are distracted by missing the dance and making Kimmy feeling guilty and upset. However, Lance's lack of concern for their feelings pushes Ilana and Octus over the top, and the creature is soundly defeated as a result of their frustration. Later, Kimmy, fed up with Octus' "bathroom" disappearances, breaks up with him, while Ilana and Lance share a dance under the spotlight, their dates having run off together. Modula, after destroying the alien, continues plotting a way to destroy Ilana once and for all.
18	"A Family Crisis"	Robert Alvarez, Larry Leichliter and Yoon, Sung Wook	Genndy Tartakovsky	Sung Jin Ahn, Ricardo Delgado, and Genndy Tartakovsky	March 26, 2011	1.50
Solomon and his team land at a heavily damaged space station when they are attacked by a burst of energy. Meanwhile, Octus is thrown a surprise birthday party by Lance and Ilana. During the party, Octus receives a distressing call from Solomon that requires Titan's immediate assistance. Titan arrives at the space station and are able to survive one encounter with the creature thanks to Solomon. He explains it is a creature made of pure lightning-like electrical energy and when it drains the energy of something, it cannot be recharged again. As they flee from the creature, Octus is hit by the creature in his leg, and cannot fix it. The gang then decide to contain the creature instead of destroying it. Lance and Solomon head towards the creature while Octus and Ilana hide. They manage to trap the creature temporarily, until Solomon's ship arrives. All of them escape, except for Lance due to the cable breaking. Octus saves him but is drained by the creature. When they try to recharge his mainframe it fails, and a strongly infuriated and heartbroken Lance uses Solomon's ship to destroy the station and the extraterrestrial creature within.
19	"The Steel Foe"	Robert Alvarez, Larry Leichliter, Randy Myers and Koh, Jae Bong	Darrick Bachman	Andy Suriano and Henry Yu	April 2, 2011	1.80
Lance and Ilana have been on the run for three whole weeks trying to reboot Octus. Meanwhile, a giant Mutraddi beast has been ravaging Sherman in Titan's absence. General Steel reveals a giant robot named The "Homeland Mobile Emergency Robot" HMER (nicknamed the Hammer); constructed from the metal scraps of the gigantic rocket that Tashy was sent to Earth in; which he uses to defeat the creature. Lance believes that if they can sneak into the army base with the recharge unit for The Hammer, they will have enough energy and power to reboot Octus, but they are discovered and find themselves fighting the army and the Hammer. Without the intense energy and abilities of Titan, they are both easily overwhelmed. G3 intervenes to rescue Lance and Ilana and they join forces to prepare to battle against General Steel and the Hammer.
20	"A New Beginning"	Robert Alvarez, Larry Leichliter and Jeong, Yu Mun	Darrick Bachman	Bryan Andrews, Genndy Tartakovsky, and Henry Yu	April 9, 2011	1.50
General Steel launches an all-out assault on G3's mobile airship base with his new Hammer robot, and it's up to Lance and Ilana to stop it. The battle is soon interrupted when three Mutraddi monsters attack three parts of the world simultaneously. During the battle, the mysterious and shadowed leader of G3 successfully reboots Octus. Overjoyed to have their dearest friend and "father" back, they reform Sym-bionic Titan; defeating all three monsters with ease. At the end of the day, the trio search for G3, who have disappeared, apparently gone into hiding. Soon after, Octus sends Kimmy a text that he will be home soon which brings tears to her eyes, as they head back to Sherman. Note: This is the series finale, which ends this show on a cliffhanger.

== Production ==
Series co-creator Genndy Tartakovsky, best known for creating Dexter's Laboratory, Star Wars: Clone Wars and Samurai Jack for Cartoon Network, drew inspiration for the show from many sources. He grew up with various mecha anime series from the 1980s such as Robotech and Voltron: "For whatever reason, I have always loved the idea of kids driving giant robots". His biggest influence for the show were John Hughes films (such as Sixteen Candles and The Breakfast Club) and 1980s pop culture, while the relationship between the two teenage leads, Ilana and Lance, was inspired by that of Sheeta and Pazu, the two leads in Hayao Miyazaki's Castle in the Sky.

Tartakovsky came up with Octus and the high-school setting first and later, together with co-creators Paul Rudish and Bryan Andrews, added Ilana and Lance as the protagonists. The creators of the show took a long time to develop the female lead: "A positive strong female character is something I've always wanted to create".

Tartakovsky had called Sym-Bionic Titan "the most challenging project I have ever done". Despite airing on Cartoon Network, Tartakovsky stated that he "doesn't consider Sym-Bionic Titan a kids show".

== Home media ==
The entire series was released on DVD in Australia from Madman Entertainment on April 6, 2016, five years after the show's cancellation. The show was made available for streaming on Netflix in December 2019, but was later removed from the service the following year. Although Sym-Bionic Titan has never been released to DVD or Blu-ray in the United States, all 20 episodes were also available on iTunes and the Microsoft Store in SD.

== Reception ==
=== Critical reception ===
The series was positively received. Emily Ashby of Common Sense Media said that the series had "action, adventure, and positive messages for tweens." She argued that while there is cartoon violence, the show has positive like Ilana, describing her a "role model-worthy main female character." She also noted that there is a "gentle side to the show" which makes it different from "many action-adventure cartoons for kids."

=== Awards and nominations ===
Sym-Bionic Titan received two nominations at the 38th Annie Awards in 2011: Stephen DeStefano for Best Character Design in a Television Production; and Scott Wills for Best Production Design in an Animated Television Production.

== Future ==
In March 2011, it was announced that Cartoon Network had cancelled Sym-Bionic Titan due to the show being unable to acquire a toy license. Adult Swim's Tumblr later revealed that both Beware the Batman and Sym-Bionic Titan were both written off by the network in September 2014.

In a 2018 interview with Syfy, Tartakovsky revealed that he and his crew had written 10 more episodes before the show was cancelled. In February 2017, Tartakovsky mentioned that, during an interview about the revival of Samurai Jack on Adult Swim, he could also return to Cartoon Network someday and bring Sym-Bionic Titan back in order to end the story of season one and resolve its cliffhanger in the style of Guillermo del Toro's Pacific Rim. Ilana and Octus later made cameo appearances in the OK K.O.! Let's Be Heroes episode "Crossover Nexus", with Tara Strong reprising her role as Ilana. In 2023, Tartakovsky reiterated his interest in continuing the story.

== See also ==
- Megas XLR
- Pacific Rim
- 3Below: Tales of Arcadia
- The Powers of Matthew Star
