= Kevin Thoms =

American actor

- Born: July 4, 1979 (age 46); Smithtown, New York, U.S.
- Occupation: Actor
- Years active: 2001-present

Kevin Thoms (born July 4, 1979) is an American actor, perhaps best known for providing the voice for Lance in Cartoon Network's Sym-Bionic Titan. Prior to this role, he has been cast in many films and television series including Riding In Cars With Boys, Ed, Law and Order: Special Victims Unit, as either main roles, minor roles or guest roles. He has also had a few other voice roles in Star Wars: The Clone Wars, Fusion Fall (as Lance), Aion, and other video game and animated series.
