= Majipoor Chronicles =

First edition (publ. Arbor House) Cover art by Loretta Trezzo

Majipoor Chronicles is a collection of ten stories (five short stories, three novelettes and two novellas) by Robert Silverberg, published in 1982. The stories are all part of the Majipoor series.

== Plot summary ==
The stories involving a young man reviewing memory records of other people, as a framing device.

== Contents ==
- "Prologue"
- Stories:
  - "Thesme and the Ghayrog" (1982), novelette
  - "The Time of the Burning" (1982), short story
  - "In the Fifth Year of the Voyage" (1981), novelette
  - "Calintane Explains" (1982), short story
  - "The Desert of Stolen Dreams" (1981), novella
  - "The Soul Painter and the Shapeshifter" (1981), novelette
  - "Crime and Punishment" (1982), short story
  - "Among the Dream-Speakers" (1982), short story
  - "A Thief in Ni-Moya" (1981), novella
  - "Voriax and Valentine" (1982), short story
- "Epilogue"

== Reception ==
Dave Langford reviewed Majipoor Chronicles for White Dwarf #48, and stated that "Pleasant and highly competent, they never quite engage the emotions they should."

== Reviews ==
- Review by Jeff Frane (1982) in Locus, #254 March 1982
- Review by Baird Searles (1982) in Isaac Asimov's Science Fiction Magazine, August 1982
- Review by Ian Watson (1982) in Foundation, #26 October 1982
- Review by Nigel Richardson (1983) in Vector 114
- Review by Chris Amies (1992) in Vector 166
