= Majipoor series =

Novel series by Robert Silverberg

- Cover for Lord Valentine's Castle.
- Lord Valentine's Castle (1980); Majipoor Chronicles (1982); Valentine Pontifex (1983); The Mountains of Majipoor (1995); Sorcerers of Majipoor (1997); Lord Prestimion (1999); The King of Dreams (2001); Tales of Majipoor (2013)
- Author: Robert Silverberg
- Country: United States
- Language: English
- Genre: Science fiction, fantasy, science fantasy
- Publisher: Harper, Eos Press, Roc Books
- Published: 1980-
- Media type: Print
- No. of books: 8

The Majipoor series is a series of novels and shorter works by American writer Robert Silverberg, set on the planet Majipoor. The setting is a mixture of science fiction and fantasy elements.

== The series ==
Books in the series:

1. Lord Valentine Cycle:
  1. Lord Valentine's Castle (1980) ISBN 0-06-014026-7, novel, Locus Award for Best Fantasy Novel winner, 1981; Hugo Award nominee, 1981
  2. Majipoor Chronicles (1982) ISBN 0-87795-358-9, collection of 5 short stories and 5 novelettes/novellas:
    "Thesme and the Ghayrog" (novelette), "The Time of the Burning", "In the Fifth Year of the Voyage" (novelette), "Calintane Explains", "The Desert of Stolen Dreams" (novella), "The Soul Painter and the Shapeshifter" (novelette), "Crime and Punishment", "Among the Dream-Speakers", "A Thief in Ni-Moya" (novella), "Voriax and Valentine"
  3. Valentine Pontifex (1983) ISBN 0-87795-544-1, novel
2. The Mountains of Majipoor (1995) ISBN 0-553-09614-1, novel
3. Lord Prestimion Cycle (prequel):
  1. Sorcerers of Majipoor (1997) ISBN 0-333-64486-7, novel
  2. Lord Prestimion (1999) ISBN 0-00-224678-3, novel
  3. The King of Dreams (2001) ISBN 0-00-224745-3, novel
4. Tales of Majipoor (2013) ISBN 978-0-575-13006-7, collection of 7 novelettes/novellas:
  "The End of the Line" (novelette), "The Book of Changes" (novella), "The Tomb of the Pontifex Dvorn" (novelette), "The Sorcerer's Apprentice" (novelette), "Dark Times at the Midnight Market" (novelette), "The Way They Wove the Spells in Sippulgar" (novelette), "The Seventh Shrine" (novella)

The works in the series are as follows, in internal chronological order.

Title	Published	Type	Series	Collection
"Thesme and the Ghayrog"	1982	Novelette		Majipoor Chronicles
"The End of the Line"	2011	Novelette		Tales of Majipoor
"The Time of the Burning"	1982	Short story		Majipoor Chronicles
"The Book of Changes"	2003	Novella		Tales of Majipoor
"In the Fifth Year of the Voyage"	1981	Novelette		Majipoor Chronicles
"Calintane Explains"	1982	Short story		Majipoor Chronicles
"The Tomb of the Pontifex Dvorn"	2011	Novelette		Tales of Majipoor
"The Way They Wove the Spells in Sippulgar"	2009	Novelette		Tales of Majipoor
Sorcerers of Majipoor	1997	Novel	Lord Prestimion Cycle #1	
Lord Prestimion	1999	Novel	Lord Prestimion Cycle #2	
"The Desert of Stolen Dreams"	1981	Novella		Majipoor Chronicles
The King of Dreams	2001	Novel	Lord Prestimion Cycle #3	
"The Sorcerer's Apprentice"	2004	Novelette		Tales of Majipoor
"The Soul Painter and the Shapeshifter"	1981	Novelette		Majipoor Chronicles
"Crime and Punishment"	1982	Short story		Majipoor Chronicles
"Dark Times at the Midnight Market"	2010	Novelette		Tales of Majipoor
"Among the Dream-Speakers"	1982	Short story		Majipoor Chronicles
"A Thief in Ni-Moya"	1981	Novella		Majipoor Chronicles
"Voriax and Valentine"	1982	Short story		Majipoor Chronicles
Lord Valentine's Castle	1980	Novel	Lord Valentine Cycle #1	
Majipoor Chronicles	1982	Short stories collection	Lord Valentine Cycle #2 (frame story)	
Valentine Pontifex	1983	Novel	Lord Valentine Cycle #3	
"The Seventh Shrine"	1998	Novella		Tales of Majipoor
The Mountains of Majipoor	1995	Novel		
Tales of Majipoor	2013	Short stories collection		

== Planet Majipoor ==
Majipoor is a planet much larger than Earth, though far less dense, so that its surface gravity is almost the same as on Earth. It has been settled by humans, Ghayrogs, Skandars, Vroons, Liimen, Hjorts and other alien races for many thousands of years. The aboriginal inhabitants of the planet, the Piurivar, were conquered by humans many thousands of years ago and are now confined to a reservation. The planet is ruled by an unusual tetrarchy of Powers: an adoptive Coronal rules in a highly visible and symbolic manner from his palace atop Castle Mount; the previous Coronal retires to become the Pontifex, the head of the bureaucracy in an underground Labyrinth; the Coronal's mother becomes the Lady of the Isle of Sleep, promoting the morals of Majipoor by sending dreams to its inhabitants; while a hereditary King of Dreams on the distant continent of Suvrael punishes wrongdoers by visiting them with nightmares. The post of King of Dreams is created at the end of King of Dreams, while Valentine Pontifex ends with the creation of a fifth Power, representing the Piurivar.

Majipoor receives the occasional starship, but is generally considered a backwater planet. Metals of all sorts are scarce, since the planet has a very light crust. Technology is pervasive but often of ancient origin and no longer fully understood. For example, draft animals called "mounts" are used for farming and transport, but the animals were artificially created in the distant past by genetic manipulation, and the technologies involved have been forgotten. Many great engineering works are described, but these were also usually created long ago. Many modern technologies, such as TV and radio, seem to be nonexistent or in very limited use. The average Majipooran lives a peasant lifestyle, and agriculture is a common occupation.

== Races ==
There are several races which inhabit Majipoor in the millions, along with various aliens visiting from off-world. Ancient laws dictate that no race may exclusively occupy a given district, so most races can be found in some numbers virtually anywhere. On the village level, there are monocultures, however. Some areas also have a small number of other intelligent beings visiting from off-world. There are also indigenous sea dragons, discovered to be highly intelligent.

Humans
The primary inhabitants of Majipoor. Apparently, the ruling hierarchy are drawn exclusively from human families and humans were the first race to colonize the planet (then occupied only by a few million Shapeshifters). In the various Majipoor books, humans are also the primary economic force. The vast majority of nobles, wealthy merchants and landowners are human. The Coronal, Pontifex, Lady of the Isle of Sleep, and King of Dreams are all humans, as are the bulk of their respective staffs. Occasionally a Vroon, Hjort or Su-Suheris will become a key advisor to a Coronal or Pontifex.

Vroons
A smallish, somewhat octopus-like race. Many are wizards, and they are known for the direction-finding and healing arts. Some can see the future in a limited way.

Hjorts
A squat, bipedal race with bulging eyes and grey lumpy skin. While unattractive in appearance, they provide the bulk of the bureaucracy that keeps the vast and complex society of Majipoor operating. Some engage in mercantile activities, as well.

Skandars
A four-armed, shaggy, tall and very strong race. They can be found as cargo-handlers, teamsters and sailing ship crew. A few Skandars take up juggling, and with four arms they are unparalleled at this art. Skandars are known to be obstinate and hot-headed.

Liimen
A three-eyed race of lesser intelligence that perform menial work such as fishing, selling grilled meats, or janitorial tasks. No Liimen are mentioned as higher-ups in the government or as businessmen.

Su-Suheris
A mysterious tall folk with two small heads on a single neck. Through an unknown mechanism, both heads share a single consciousness. A few are great sorcerers or advisers to men of power in the government. Some Su-Suheris have psychic powers and are capable of seeing the future. They tend to be fairly aloof, and perhaps consider themselves better than the other races.

Ghayrogs
A bipedal race with reptilian features, forked tongues, and black serpentine hair. While their population is concentrated in the crystal city of Dulorn, Ghayrogs can be found throughout much of Majipoor, some serving as high government functionaries. They generally display little or no emotion and do not sleep most of the year. Ghayrogs are egg-layers, but mammalian despite their scaly skins.

Piurivar (also called Metamorphs or Shapeshifters)
The original race occupying Majipoor. They were none too pleased when humans began colonizing the planet, and a smoldering guerrilla war lasted for many centuries before the Coronal Lord Stiamot rounded up and evicted the Metamorphs from Alhanroel, restricting them to a reservation on Zimroel. Normally bipedal, with flat faces and green/grey skin, the Shapeshifters have the ability to mimic virtually any bipedal race. When so disguised, they are virtually indistinguishable from the real thing. This aided them greatly in their struggles with human colonists early in Majipoor's history. Eventually, techniques were devised to detect Metamorphs, and they were confined largely to a vast reservation on Zimroel. But the intelligent beings have never stopped dreaming of a day when they would retake the planet from the various other sentient species which now inhabit it.

== Geography ==
The characters of any given book often travel vast distances across the face of Majipoor. The planet itself has three main continents, a major island, several smaller islands of note, and one hemisphere which is the Great Sea (entirely water).

Alhanroel
The first continent settled by humans from Old Earth (as it is known). In many of the tales in the series, it is the more populous of the continents, though this is likely not the case by the time of Lord Valentine's Castle and sequels. The centers of government, the Castle and Labyrinth, are located here. Many of the princely families from whom the Coronal is typically chosen reside in Alhanroel. Residents of Alhanroel (especially those of status) consider themselves superior to those of Zimroel. People from Alhanroel tend to call the Piurivar "Metamorphs" and have a particular accent to their speech.

Castle Mount
Alhanroel is home to Castle Mount, a huge mountain 30 miles tall. It is so tall that its summit is above most of the atmosphere and originally existed in the vacuum of outer space. Using force fields and "weather machines" the mountain is now inhabitable with a bucolic climate, and is home to millions of people who live in the Fifty Cities of the Mount. At the summit is the Coronal's Castle, which is referred to as "Lord (current Coronal's) Castle". Since each Coronal is expected to add a room or structure to the Castle, it is huge indeed.

Labyrinth
Home of the Pontifex, who is succeeded by the then-current Coronal. This strange city is in a desert region and is built almost entirely below ground. Many layers beneath the ground, the bureaucracy that actually runs Majipoor is busy with their statistical analyses and other "official" paperwork. The Pontifex himself, technically the top executive of the planet, spends most of the remainder of his life here except for occasional excursions.

Zimroel
Not settled until later in Majipoor's history, and many areas remain a mystery to humans. In some of the earliest Majipoor tales, only certain natural harbor towns held any significant settlement, though by the time of Lord Valentine many parts are densely populated indeed. Zimroel is larger than Alhanroel, and Lord Valentine's journey across the continent took many months. The Coronal and Pontifex have less influence here as well, with the Procurator of Ni-Moya being a more direct overlord (until that office was abolished). There is a sense that Zimroel is more of a series of city states than a unified whole. Zimroel-born folk call the Piurivar "Shapeshifters" and appear to have a distinct accent considered inferior by those from Alhanroel.

Isle of Sleep
A very large, circular island surrounded by white cliffs which lies between Alhanroel and Zimroel in the Inner Sea. On most planets, it would be considered a continent in its own right. The Lady of Sleep, who by tradition is the Coronal's oldest living female relative (usually mother or aunt) uses ancient dream-sending machines to instruct and guide the citizens of the planet in their sleep. It must work, as Majipoor has rarely encountered the kind of violence found on other worlds. Initiates of all races from across the planet come to the Isle to serve the Lady and find inner peace. There are only two small ports servicing the Isle, which is really quite self-sufficient.

Suvrael
A very hot southern continent. Much of it is desert, though grazing-land for herd animals is also plentiful. It is home to the Barjazid family, who managed to obtain dream-sending equipment of their own during the time of Lord Prestimion, and the King of Dreams was soon recognized as a Power in his own right. He uses his unique capabilities to punish evildoers with nightmares.
