= John Lukacs =

Hungarian-born American historian and author (1924–2019)

- Born: Lukács János Albert; January 31, 1924; Budapest, Hungary
- Died: May 6, 2019 (aged 95); Phoenixville, Pennsylvania, U.S.
- Education: University of Budapest (PhD)
- Occupation: Historian

John Adalbert Lukacs (/ˈluːkəs/; Hungarian: Lukács János Albert; January 31, 1924 – May 6, 2019) was a Hungarian-born American historian and author of more than thirty books. Lukacs described himself as a reactionary.

== Life and career ==
Lukacs was born in Budapest, Hungary, the son of Magdaléna Glück and Pál Lukács (born Löwinger), a physician. His parents, Jewish converts to Roman Catholicism, were divorced before World War II. Lukacs attended a classical gymnasium, had an English language tutor, and spent two summers at a private school in England. He studied history at the University of Budapest.

During the Second World War, when German troops occupied Hungary (Operation Margarethe) in 1944, Lukacs was forced to serve in a Hungarian labour battalion for Jews. By the end of 1944, he had deserted from the battalion and was hiding in a cellar until the end of the war, evading deportation to death camps and surviving the siege of Budapest. According to his son, Lukacs never saw his parents again. After the war, Lukacs worked as the Secretary of the Hungarian-American Society. In 1946, he received his doctorate from the University of Budapest.

On 22 July 1946, as it was becoming clear that Hungary would become a Communist state, Lukacs fled to the United States. He found employment as a part-time assistant lecturer at Columbia University in New York City. He then relocated to Philadelphia, where in 1947 he began work as a history professor at Chestnut Hill College, a women's college at the time. Lukacs was a professor of history there until 1994 and chaired the history department from 1947 to 1974. He served as a visiting professor at Johns Hopkins University, Columbia University, Princeton University, La Salle University, Regent College in British Columbia, the University of Budapest, and Hanover College. He was a president of the American Catholic Historical Association and a member of both the Royal Historical Society and the American Philosophical Society.

== Views ==
Being an ardent anti-communist, Lukacs nevertheless wrote in the early 1950s several articles in Commonweal criticizing the approach taken by Senator Joseph McCarthy, whom he described as a vulgar demagogue. Lukacs saw populism as the primary threat to modern civilization. By his own description, he considered himself a reactionary. He identified populism as the essence of both Nazism and communism, denying the existence of generic fascism and asserted that the differences between the political regimes of Nazi Germany and Fascist Italy were greater than their similarities.

A major theme in Lukacs's writing is his agreement with the French historian Alexis de Tocqueville that aristocratic elites have been replaced by democratic elites, which obtain power via an appeal to the masses. In his 2002 book, At the End of an Age, Lukacs argued that the modern/bourgeois age, which began around the time of the Renaissance, is coming to an end. The rise of populism and the decline of elitism is the theme of his experimental work, A Thread of Years (1998), a series of vignettes set in each year of the 20th century from 1900 to 1998, tracing the abandonment of gentlemanly conduct and the rise of vulgarity in American culture. Lukacs defends traditional Western civilization against what he sees as the leveling and debasing effects of mass culture.

An Anglophile, Lukacs gives the highest historical importance to Winston Churchill. He considered Churchill to be the greatest statesman of the 20th century, the savior not only of Great Britain but also of Western civilization itself. A recurring theme in his writing is the duel between Churchill and Adolf Hitler for mastery of the world. Their moral struggle, which Lukacs sees as a conflict between the archetypical reactionary and the archetypical revolutionary, is the major theme of The Last European War (1976), The Duel (1991), Five Days in London (1999) and 2008's Blood, Toil, Tears and Sweat, a book which features Churchill's first major speech as Prime Minister. Lukacs argues that Great Britain and by extension the British Empire could not defeat Germany by itself, and that winning required the entry of the United States and the Soviet Union. He observes that by inspiring the British people to resist German air attacks and to "never surrender" during the Battle of Britain in 1940, Churchill laid the groundwork for the subsequent victory of the Allies.

Lukacs had strong isolationist beliefs and unusually for an anti-communist émigré also had "surprisingly critical views of the Cold War from a unique conservative perspective", being described as one of "anti-anticommunists among conservatives and their fellow travelers". Lukacs argued that the Soviet Union was a feeble power on the verge of collapse and thus contended that the Cold War was an unnecessary waste of American treasure and life. Likewise, Lukacs was critical of Foreign interventions by the United States, and also condemned the 2003 invasion of Iraq.

In his book George F. Kennan and the Origins of Containment, 1944-1946 (1997), a collection of letters exchanged between Lukacs and his close friend George F. Kennan during 1994–1995, Lukacs and Kennan criticized the claim of the New Left that the Cold War was caused by the United States; however, Lukacs argued that while Joseph Stalin was largely responsible for the beginning of the Cold War, the administration of Dwight D. Eisenhower missed a chance for ending the Cold War in 1953 after Stalin's death, which kept it on for many more decades.

=== The Hitler of History ===
From around 1977 onwards, Lukacs became one of the leading critics of the British author David Irving, whom Lukacs accused of engaging in unscholarly practices and having neo-Nazi sympathies. In a review of Irving's Hitler's War in 1977, Lukacs commented that as a "right-wing revisionist" who had admired some of Irving's early works, he initially had high hopes for Hitler's War, but he found the book to be "appalling". Lukacs commented that Irving had uncritically used personal remembrances by those who knew Adolf Hitler to present him in the most favorable light possible. In his review, Lukacs argued that although World War II ended with Eastern Europe being left under Soviet domination, a victory that left only half of Europe to Stalin was much better than a defeat that left all of Europe to Hitler.

External videos
- Booknotes interview with Lukacs on The Hitler of History, February 28, 1998, C-SPAN

Lukacs's book The Hitler of History (1997), a prosopography of the historians who have written biographies of Hitler, is in part a critique of Irving's work. Lukacs considered Irving to be sympathetic to the Nazis. In turn, Irving has engaged in what many consider to be antisemitic and racist attacks against Lukacs. Because Lukacs' mother was Jewish, Irving disparagingly refers to him as "a Jewish historian". In letters of 25 October and 28 October 1997, Irving threatened to sue Lukacs for libel if he published his book (The Hitler of History) without removing certain passages which were highly critical of Irving's work. The American edition of The Hitler of History was published in 1997 with the passages included, but because of Irving's legal threats no British edition of The Hitler of History was published until 2001. As a result of Irving's threat of legal action under British libel laws, when the British edition was finally published the passages containing the criticism of Irving's historical methods were expunged by the publisher.

In The Hitler of History, inspired by the example of Pieter Geyl's book, Napoleon For and Against, Lukacs examines the state of Hitler scholarship and offers his own observations about Hitler. In Lukacs's view, Hitler was a racist, nationalist, revolutionary, and populist. Lukacs criticizes Marxist and liberal historians who argue that the German working class were strongly anti-Nazi, and instead he argues that the exact opposite was the case. Each chapter of The Hitler of History is devoted to a particular topic, such as whether Hitler was a reactionary or revolutionary; a nationalist or a racist; and he examines the roots of Hitler's ideology. Lukacs denies that Hitler developed a belief in racial purity during his time in Vienna (1907–1913) under the Habsburg monarchy. Instead, Lukacs dates Hitler's turn to antisemitism to 1919 in post-World War I Munich, in particular to the events surrounding the Bavarian Soviet Republic and its defeat by the right-wing Freikorps. Much influenced by Rainer Zitelmann's work, Lukacs describes Hitler as a self-conscious, modernizing revolutionary. Citing the critique of national socialism developed by German conservative historians such as Hans Rothfels and Gerhard Ritter, Lukacs describes the Nazi movement as the culmination of the dark forces which lurk within modern civilization.

In Lukacs's view, Operation Barbarossa was not inspired by anti-communism or any long-term plan to conquer the Soviet Union as suggested by historians such as Andreas Hillgruber, who claims that Hitler had a Stufenplan ('stepped plan', more loosely 'step-by-step plan'), but it was rather an ad hoc reaction forced on Hitler in 1940–1941 by Britain's refusal to surrender. Lukacs argues that the reason Hitler gave for the invasion of Russia was the real one. He stated that Britain would not surrender because Winston Churchill held out the hope that the Soviet Union might enter the war on the Allied side and so Germany had to eliminate that hope; however, other historians have argued that the reason was just a pretext. For Lukacs, Operation Barbarossa was as much anti-British as it was anti-Soviet. He argues that Hitler's statement in August 1939 to the League of Nations High Commissioner for Danzig, the Swiss diplomat Carl Jacob Burckhardt ("Everything I undertake is directed against Russia"), which Hillgruber cited as evidence of Hitler's anti-Soviet intentions, was part of an effort to intimidate Britain and France into abandoning Poland. Lukacs takes issue with Hillgruber's claim that the war against Britain was of "secondary" importance to Hitler compared to the war against the Soviet Union. Lukacs has also been one of the critics of Viktor Suvorov, who has argued that Barbarossa was a "preventative war" forced upon Germany by Stalin, who according to Suvorov was planning to attack Germany later in the summer of 1941.

=== Later work ===
External videos
- Presentation by Lukacs on Democracy and Populism, April 1, 2005, C-SPAN
- Presentation by Lukacs on George Kennan: A Study of Character, May 2, 2007, C-SPAN
- Presentation by Lukacs on Blood, Toil, Tears, and Sweat, June 17, 2008, C-SPAN
- Presentation by Lukacs on Last Rites, February 22, 2009, C-SPAN

In his book Democracy and Populism: Fear and Hatred (2005), Lukacs writes about the state of American democracy. He warns that the populism he perceives as ascendant in the United States renders it vulnerable to demagoguery. He claims that a transformation from liberal democracy to populism can be seen in the replacement of knowledge and history with propaganda and infotainment. In the same book, Lukacs criticizes legalized abortion, pornography, cloning, and [sexual permissiveness as marking what he sees as the increasing decadence, depravity, corruption, and amorality of modern American society.

June 1941: Hitler and Stalin (2006) is a book-length study of the two leaders with a focus on the events leading up to Operation Barbarossa. George Kennan: A Study of Character (2007) is a biography of Lukacs' friend George F. Kennan, based on privileged access to Kennan's private papers. Blood, Toil, Tears and Sweat (2008) is a continuation of his work on what Lukacs considered the greatness of Churchill. Last Rites (2009) continues the "auto-history" he published in Confessions of an Original Sinner (1990). The Future of History was published on 26 April 2011.

In A Short History of the Twentieth Century (2013), Lukacs attempts to challenge the idea (common to both professional historians and experts in international relations) that the Cold War presented a bipolar system or a major strategic rivalry or conflict, instead arguing that the 20th century was one of American dominance. Citing the biographical example of Hitler, as well as left- and right-wing populism in the United States, Lukacs also argues in the book that populism was the most destructive force of the 20th century and attempts to disentangle the concept of populism from its frequent (although Lukacs argues it is inaccurate) conflation with the inherent stances of left-wing politics.

== Private life ==
In 1953, Lukacs married Helen Elizabeth Schofield, the daughter of a Philadelphia lawyer; the couple had two children. His wife died in 1970. He married his second wife, Stephanie Harvey, in 1974. From this marriage, Lukacs had step-children; his second wife died in 2003. He married for a third time but his marriage to Pamela Hall ended in divorce.

After his retirement in 1994, Lukacs concentrated on writing. He resided in Schuylkill Township, Chester County, Pennsylvania and retained nearly 18,000 books in his home library. Lukacs died from congestive heart failure on May 6, 2019, at his home in Phoenixville, Pennsylvania.

== Works ==
- The Great Powers and Eastern Europe (New York: American Book Co., 1953).
- A History of the Cold War (Garden City, N.Y.: Doubleday, 1961).
- Decline and Rise of Europe: A Study in Recent History, With Particular Emphasis on the Development of a European Consciousness (Garden City, N.Y., Doubleday, 1965).
- A New History of the Cold War (Garden City, N.Y.: Doubleday, 1966).
- Historical Consciousness; or, The Remembered Past (New York: Harper & Row, 1968). Lukacs, John (1968). pbk reprint of 1994 edition. Transaction Publishers. ISBN 978-1-56000-732-6. LCCN 93048925.
- The Passing of the Modern Age (New York: Harper & Row, 1970).
- A Sketch of the History of Chestnut Hill College, 1924–1974 (Chestnut Hill, PA: Chestnut Hill College, 1975).
- The Last European War: September 1939–December 1941 (Garden City, N.Y.: Anchor Press, 1976).
- 1945: Year Zero (New York: Doubleday, 1978).
- Philadelphia: Patricians and Philistines, 1900–1950 (New York: Farrar, Straus, Giroux, 1981).
- Outgrowing Democracy: A History of the United States in the Twentieth century (Garden City, N.Y.: Doubleday, 1984).
- Budapest 1900: A Historical Portrait of a City and its Culture (London: Weidenfeld & Nicolson, 1988). Lukacs, John (January 5, 2012). 2012 ebook edition. Open Road + Grove/Atlantic. ISBN 9780802194213.
- Confessions of an Original Sinner (New York: Ticknor and Fields, 1990).
- The Duel: 10 May–31 July 1940: the Eighty-Day Struggle between Churchill and Hitler (New York: Ticknor & Fields, 1991).
- The End of the Twentieth Century and the End of the Modern Age (New York: Ticknor & Fields, 1993).
- Destinations Past: Traveling through History with John Lukacs (Columbia, MO: University of Missouri Press, 1994).
- The Hitler of History (New York: A. A. Knopf, 1997).
- George F. Kennan and the Origins of Containment, 1944–1946: the Kennan-Lukacs Correspondence, Introduction by John Lukacs. (Columbia, Mo.: University of Missouri Press, 1997).
- A Thread of Years (New Haven [Conn.]: Yale University Press, 1998). ISBN 0-300-07188-4
- Five Days in London, May 1940 (New Haven [Conn.]: Yale University Press, 1999).
- A Student's Guide to the Study of History (Wilmington, DE: ISI Books, Intercollegiate Studies Institute, 2000).
- Churchill: Visionary, Statesman, Historian (New Haven [Conn.]: Yale University Press, 2002).
- At the End of an Age (New Haven [Conn.]: Yale University Press, 2002).
- A New Republic: A History Of The United States In The Twentieth Century(New Haven [Conn.]: Yale University Press, 2004).
- Democracy and Populism: Fear & Hatred (New Haven: Yale University Press, 2005).
- Remembered Past: John Lukacs On History, Historians & Historical Knowledge: A Reader (Wilmington, DE: ISI Books, Intercollegiate Studies Institute, 2005).
- June 1941: Hitler and Stalin. New Haven; London: Yale University Press, 2006 (ISBN 0-300-11437-0).
- George Kennan: A Study of Character. New Haven; London: Yale University Press, 2007 (ISBN 0-300-12221-7).
- Blood, Toil, Tears and Sweat: The Dire Warning. New York: Basic Books, 2008 (ISBN 0-465-00287-0).
- Last Rites. New Haven; London: Yale University Press, 2009 (ISBN 978-0-300-11438-6).
- The Legacy of the Second World War. New Haven; London: Yale University Press, 2010 (ISBN 0-300-11439-7).
- Through the History of the Cold War: The Correspondence of George F. Kennan and John Lukacs / Edited by John Lukacs. University of Pennsylvania Press, 2010. (ISBN 978-0-812-22271-5)
- The Future of History. New Haven; London: Yale University Press, 2011 (ISBN 0-300-16956-6). Lukacs, John (April 26, 2011). 2011 pbk edition. Yale University Press. ISBN 978-0-300-16956-0.
- A Short History of the Twentieth Century. Harvard University Press, 2013 (ISBN 978-0-674-72536-2)
- We at the Center of the Universe. St. Augustines Press, 2017 (ISBN 978-1587319099) LCCN 2016-12557

== See also ==
- List of books by or about Adolf Hitler

== Sources ==
- Allitt, Patrick Catholic Intellectuals And Conservative Politics In America 1950-1985, Cornell University Press, 1993.
- Williamson, Chilton The Conservative Bookshelf: Essential Works That Impact Today's Conservative Thinkers, Citadel Press, 2004.
- Rodden, John; Rossi, John (2008). "John Lukacs: Visionary, Critic, Historian". Society. 45 (3): 222–232. doi:10.1007/s12115-008-9095-3. S2CID 143569547.
