= Robert Silverberg =

American science fiction writer and editor (born 1935)

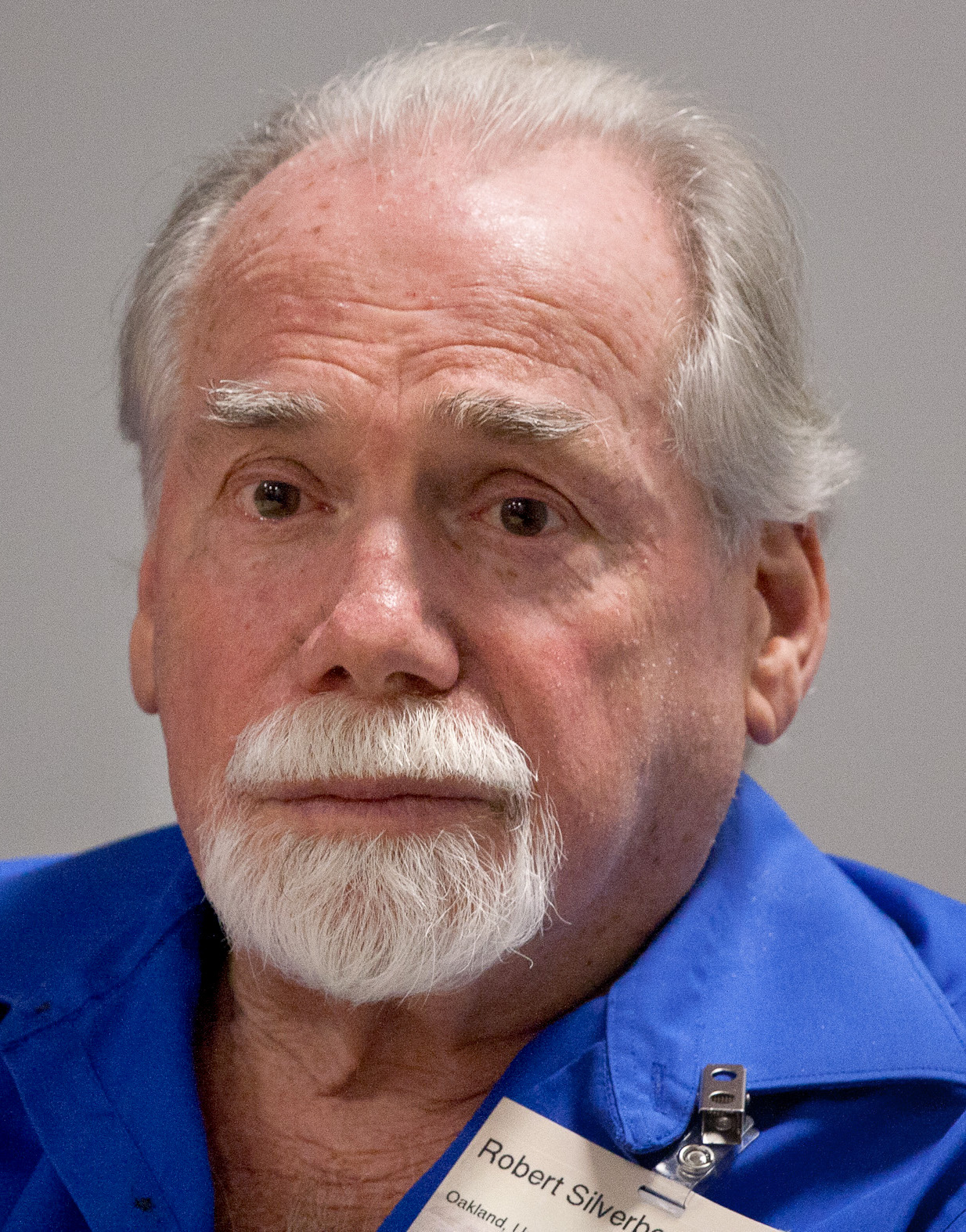
- Silverberg in 2009
- Born: January 15, 1935 (age 91); New York City, U.S.
- Education: Columbia University (BA)
- Occupations: Novelist; short-story writer; editor
- Writing career
- Pen name: Various (Note: Silverberg has used numerous pen names for his works.)
- Period: 1955–present
- Genres: Science fiction, fantasy, anthologies (as editor)
- Subjects: Geography, history, nature
- Website: robert-silverberg.com

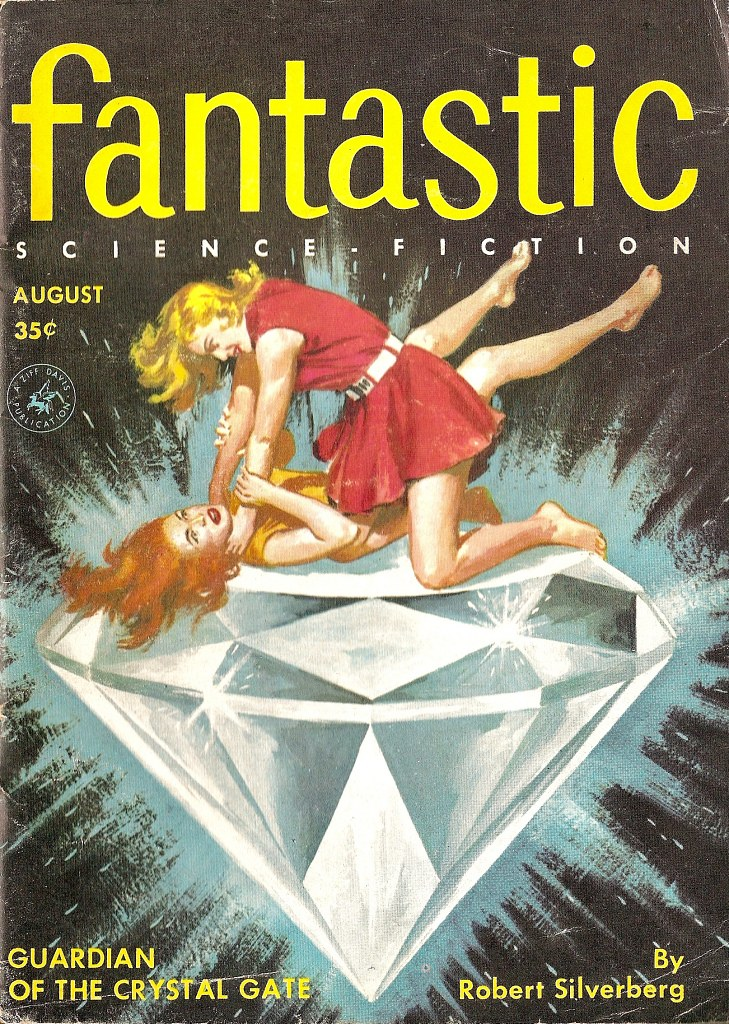
Silverberg's novelette "Guardian of the Crystal Gate" was the cover story in the August 1956 issue of Fantastic.

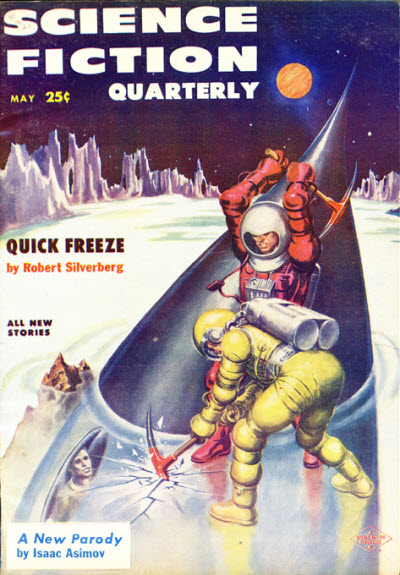
Silverberg's short story "Quick Freeze" took the cover of the May 1957 issue of Science Fiction Quarterly.

Robert Silverberg (born January 15, 1935) is a prolific American science fiction author and editor. He is a multiple winner of both Hugo and Nebula Awards, a member of the Science Fiction and Fantasy Hall of Fame, and a Grand Master of SF since 2004.

Especially noted Silverberg works include the novella Nightwings (1969) and the novels Downward to the Earth (1970), The World Inside (1971), Dying Inside (1972), and Lord Valentine's Castle (1980; the first of the Majipoor series).

As of 2015, Silverberg had attended every Hugo Award ceremony since the inaugural event in 1953.

== Early life ==
Silverberg was born on January 15, 1935, to Jewish parents in Brooklyn, New York. A voracious reader since childhood, he began submitting stories to science fiction magazines during his early teenage years. He received a BA in English Literature from Columbia University, in 1956. While at Columbia he wrote the juvenile novel Revolt on Alpha C (1955), published by Thomas Y. Crowell with the cover notice: "A gripping story of outer space". He won his first Hugo in 1956 as the "best new writer".

== Career ==
In that year Silverberg was the author or co-author of four of the six stories in the August issue of Fantastic, breaking his record set in the previous issue. For the next four years, by his own count, he wrote a million words a year, mostly for magazines and Ace Doubles. He used his own name as well as a range of pseudonyms during this era, and often worked in collaboration with Randall Garrett, who was a neighbor at the time. (The Silverberg/Garrett collaborations too were published under a variety of pseudonyms, the best-known being Robert Randall.) From 1956 to 1959, Silverberg routinely averaged five published stories a month, and he had over 80 stories published in 1958 alone.

In 1959, the market for science fiction slumped due in part to changing tastes among readers, and also due to the bankruptcy of several leading magazines of the era. Silverberg adapted by writing copiously in other fields, from historical non-fiction to crime fiction and softcore pornography. As L.T. Woodward, M.D., he wrote a number of pop psychology and sexology books. "Bob Silverberg, a giant of science fiction... was doing two [books] a month for one publisher, another for a second publisher, and the equivalent of another book for a magazine... He was writing a quarter of a million words a month" under many different pseudonyms including about 200 erotic novels published as Don Elliott. In a 2000 interview, Silverberg explained that the erotic fiction "... was undertaken at a time when I was saddled with a huge debt, at the age of 26, for a splendid house that I had bought. There would have been no way to pay the house off by writing science fiction ... so I turned out a slew of quick sex novels. I never concealed the fact that I was doing them; it made no difference at all to me whether people knew or not. It was just a job. And it was, incidentally, a job that I did very well. I think they were outstanding erotic novels."

=== Literary growth ===
In the mid-1960s, many writers in science fiction were moving away from the adventure, hard science fiction and space opera themes that often characterized the early years of the genre, and writing stories with greater literary ambitions, psychological sophistication and experimental methods (see New Wave science fiction). Frederik Pohl, then editing three science fiction magazines, offered Silverberg creative freedom in writing for them. Thus inspired, Silverberg returned to the field that gave him his start, paying far more attention to depth of character development and social background than he had in the past and mixing in elements of the modernist literature he had studied at Columbia.

Silverberg continued to write rapidly—Algis Budrys reported in 1965 that he wrote and sold at least 50,000 words ("call it the equivalent of a commercial novel") weekly—but the novels he wrote in this period are considered superior to his earlier work; Budrys in 1968 wrote of his surprise that "Silverberg is now writing deeply detailed, highly educated, beautifully figured books" like Thorns and The Masks of Time. Perhaps the first book to indicate the new Silverberg was To Open the Sky, a fixup of stories published by Pohl in Galaxy Magazine, in which a new religion helps people reach the stars. That was followed by Downward to the Earth, a story containing echoes of material from Joseph Conrad's work, in which the human former administrator of an alien world returns after the planet's inhabitants have been set free. Other acclaimed works of that time include To Live Again, in which the memories and personalities of the deceased can be transferred to other people; The World Inside, a look at an overpopulated future; and Dying Inside, a tale of a telepath losing his powers.

In the August 1967 issue of Galaxy, Silverberg published a 20,000-word novelette called "Hawksbill Station". This story earned Silverberg his first Hugo and Nebula story award nominations. An expanded novel form of Hawksbill Station was published the following year. In 1969 Nightwings was awarded the Hugo for best novella. Silverberg won a Nebula award in 1970 for the short story "Passengers", two the following year for his novel A Time of Changes and the short story "Good News from the Vatican", and yet another in 1975 for his novella Born with the Dead.

=== Later career ===
After suffering through the stresses of a major house fire and a thyroid malfunction, Silverberg moved from his native New York City to the West Coast in 1972, and he announced his retirement from writing in 1975. In 1980 he returned, however, with Lord Valentine's Castle, a panoramic adventure set on an alien planet, which has become the basis of the Majipoor series—a cycle of stories and novels set on the vast planet Majipoor, a world much larger than Earth and inhabited by no fewer than seven different species of settlers. In a 2015 interview, Silverberg said that he did not intend to write any more fiction.

Silverberg received a Nebula award in 1986 for the novella Sailing to Byzantium, which takes its name from the poem by William Butler Yeats; a Hugo in 1987 for the novella Gilgamesh in the Outback, set in the Heroes in Hell universe of Bangsian Fantasy; a Hugo in 1990 for Enter a Soldier. Later: Enter Another. The Science Fiction and Fantasy Hall of Fame inducted Silverberg in 1999, its fourth class of two deceased and two living writers, and the Science Fiction and Fantasy Writers of America made him its 21st SFWA Grand Master in 2005.

== Personal life ==
Silverberg has been married twice. He and Barbara Brown married in 1956, separated in 1976 and divorced a decade later. Silverberg and science fiction writer Karen Haber married in 1987. They live in the San Francisco Bay Area. Before the age of 30, Silverberg was independently wealthy through his investments, and once owned the former mansion of New York City Mayor Fiorello La Guardia.

== See also ==
- The Spirit of Science Fiction Bolaño's novel protagonist, Jay Schrella, wrote a letter to Robert Silverberg
