= Le Guin and Taoism =

Philosophy in Ursula Le Guin's writings

The yin-yang symbol of balanced opposites in Chinese philosophy. In Le Guin's words, "Light is the left hand of darkness; darkness is the right hand of light."

The fantasy and science fiction author Ursula K. Le Guin's writings reflect Taoist philosophy in many places, including the notions of balance between polar opposites such as light and dark, male and female, as embodied in the Yin-Yang symbol and in Laozi's text Tao Te Ching.

== Context ==
=== Ursula K. Le Guin ===
Ursula K. Le Guin (1929–2018) was an American author best known for her works of speculative fiction, including science fiction works set in her Hainish universe, and the Earthsea fantasy series. Her work was first published in 1959, and her literary career spanned nearly sixty years, producing more than twenty novels and over a hundred short stories, in addition to poetry, literary criticism, translations, and children's books. Frequently described as an author of science fiction, Le Guin has also been called a "major voice in American Letters". Le Guin said she would prefer to be known as an "American novelist".

=== Taoism ===
Taoism is a diverse philosophical and religious tradition indigenous to China, emphasizing harmony with the Tao. With a range of meaning in Chinese philosophy, translations of Tao include 'way', 'road', 'path', or 'technique', generally understood in the Taoist sense as an enigmatic process of transformation ultimately underlying reality. Taoist thought has informed the development of various practices within the Taoist tradition and beyond, including forms of meditation, astrology, qigong, feng shui, and internal alchemy. A common goal of Taoist practice is self-cultivation, a deeper appreciation of the Tao, and more harmonious existence. Taoist ethics vary, but generally emphasize such virtues as effortless action, naturalness, simplicity, and the three treasures of compassion, frugality, and humility.

== Hainish Cycle ==
The Hainish Cycle books and stories include the 1969 The Left Hand of Darkness and the 1974 The Dispossessed. The setting is a future history in which civilizations of human beings on planets orbiting a number of nearby stars, including Terra ("Earth"), are contacting each other for the first time and establishing diplomatic relations, and setting up a confederacy under the guidance of the oldest of the human worlds, peaceful Hain. In this history, human beings did not evolve on Earth but were the result of interstellar colonies planted by Hain long ago, which was followed by a long period when interstellar travel ceased. Some of the races have new genetic traits, a result of ancient Hainish experiments in genetic engineering, including people who can dream while awake, and a world of hermaphroditic people who only come into active sexuality once a month, not knowing which sex will manifest in them. In keeping with Le Guin's style, she uses varied social and environmental settings to explore the anthropological and sociological outcomes of human evolution in those diverse environments.

Douglas Barbour wrote that the fiction of the Hainish Universe contains a theme of balance between light and darkness, a central theme of Taoism. The title The Left Hand of Darkness derives from the first line of a lay traditional to the fictional planet of Gethen:

Light is the left hand of darkness,
and darkness the right hand of light.
Two are one, life and death, lying
together like lovers in kemmer,
like hands joined together,
like the end and the way.

== Earthsea Cycle ==
=== The initial trilogy and Tehanu ===
The Earthsea Cycle is a series of high fantasy books by Ursula K. Le Guin. Beginning with A Wizard of Earthsea in 1968, The Tombs of Atuan in 1970, and The Farthest Shore in 1972, the series was continued in the 1990 novel Tehanu, and in two 2001 works, Tales from Earthsea and The Other Wind. These are set in Earthsea, a legendary stage of planet Earth as an archipelago.

The Earthsea books and stories embody Taoist philosophy, with Tehanu counterbalancing the initial trilogy. In Tehanu, Ged returns to Gont, completing the cycle of his quest: Erlich comments that this movement back to his roots is Daoist. The balancing of "polarities" such as light and dark, male and female, doing and being is central to the philosophy and to the novels. The Yin-Yang symbol reflects this; the scholar of literature Richard Erlich analyses multiple occurrences of Yin-Yang in the series, commenting that "Yin-Yang, indeed, is a unifying symbol in the trilogy".

Richard Erlich's analysis of Taoist-style balancing of Yin-Yang opposites in Earthsea
Instance	Opposites		Location
"Only in silence the word"	silence	word	Epigraph at start of A Wizard of Earthsea and of Tehanu
"Only in dark the light"	dark	light	Epigraph at start of A Wizard of Earthsea and of Tehanu
"Only in dying life"	death	life	Epigraph at start of A Wizard of Earthsea and of Tehanu
White scars on Ged's dark face	dark skin	white scars	A Wizard of Earthsea
Ged merges with his shadow	shadow	hero	A Wizard of Earthsea
(Initially hostile) Tenar bonds with Ged	dark-skinned Ged	white-skinned Tenar	Tombs of Atuan
scarred Therru is a dragon	burned Therru	dragon-person Tehanu	Tehanu

Erlich writes that the three books of the initial trilogy each embody a Taoist balance that needs restoring, a needed integration, and a doorway that must be closed.

Richard Erlich's analysis of Taoist processes in the Earthsea trilogy
Necessary process	Ged in A Wizard of Earthsea	Tenar in Tombs of Atuan	Ged in The Farthest Shore
Balance to restore	"Yangish over-action, over-assertion, over-intellectuality, too much desire for life and power: in Taoist (and traditional patriarchal) symbolism, too much light"	"Too much stasis, darkness, 'cyclical' reincarnation"; Ged brings light to the Undertomb; Tenar accepts her true name from Ged	Magic has been lost in remote parts of Earthsea; joy is draining from the world
Integration to make	Ged and his shadow	Male-controlled life of Atuan's priestesses, without sex; Ged unites his half of the Ring of Erreth-Akbe with the half in the Tombs	Acceptance of mortality
Doorway to close	Doorway to the Dry Land [of death]	The Place of the Tombs of Atuan, "where the powers of darkness have irrupted into the light"	Cob has opened "a door between the realms of life and death"

=== A Wizard of Earthsea ===
The world of Earthsea is depicted as being based on a delicate balance, which most of its inhabitants are aware of, but which is disrupted by somebody in each of the original trilogy of novels. This includes an equilibrium between land and sea (implicit in the name Earthsea), and between people and their natural environment. In addition to physical equilibrium, there is a larger cosmic equilibrium, which everybody is aware of, and which wizards are tasked with maintaining. Describing this aspect of Earthsea, Elizabeth Cummins wrote, "The principle of balanced powers, the recognition that every act affects self, society, world, and cosmos, is both a physical and a moral principle of Le Guin's fantasy world." The concept of balance is related to the novel's other major theme of coming of age, as Ged's knowledge of the consequences of his own actions for good or ill is necessary for him to understand how the balance is maintained. While at the school of Roke, the Master Hand tells him:

But you must not change one thing, one pebble, one grain of sand, until you know what good and evil will follow on that act. The world is in balance, in Equilibrium. A wizard's power of Changing and of Summoning can shake the balance of the world. It is dangerous, that power. It is most perilous. It must follow knowledge, and serve need. To light a candle is to cast a shadow.

The influence of Taoism on Le Guin's writing is evident through much of the book, especially in her depiction of the "balance". At the end of the novel, Ged may be seen to embody the Taoist way of life, as he has learned not to act unless absolutely necessary. He has also learned that seeming opposites, like light and dark or good and evil, are actually interdependent. Light and dark themselves are recurring images within the story. Reviewers have identified this belief as evidence of a conservative ideology within the story, shared with much of fantasy. In emphasizing concerns over balance and equilibrium, scholars have argued, Le Guin essentially justifies the status quo, which wizards strive to maintain. This tendency is in contrast to Le Guin's science fiction writing, in which change is shown to have value.

The nature of human evil forms a significant related theme through A Wizard of Earthsea as well as the other Earthsea novels. As with other works by Le Guin, evil is shown as a misunderstanding of the balance of life. Ged is born with great power in him, but the pride that he takes in his power leads to his downfall; he tries to demonstrate his strength by bringing a spirit back from the dead, and in performing this act against the laws of nature, releases the shadow that attacks him. Slusser suggests that although he is provoked into performing dangerous spells first by the girl on Gont and then by Jasper, this provocation exists in Ged's mind. He is shown as unwilling to look within himself and see the pride that drives him to do what he does. When he accepts the shadow into himself, he also finally accepts responsibility for his own actions, and by accepting his own mortality he is able to free himself. His companion Vetch describes the moment by saying

that Ged had neither lost nor won but, naming the shadow of his death with his own name, had made himself whole: a man: who, knowing his whole true self, cannot be used or possessed by any power other than himself, and whose life therefore is lived for life's sake and never in the service of ruin, or pain, or hatred, or the dark.

Thus, although there are several dark powers in Earthsea (like the stone of Terrenon and the Nameless Ones of Atuan), the true evil was not one of these powers, or even death, but Ged's actions that went against the balance of nature. This is contrary to conventional Western and Christian storytelling, in which light and darkness are often considered opposites, and are seen as symbolizing good and evil, which are constantly in conflict. On two different occasions, Ged is tempted to try to defy death and evil, but eventually learns that neither can be eliminated: instead, he chooses not to serve evil, and stops denying death.

== Sources ==
- Creel, Herrlee Glessner (1982) [1970]. What Is Taoism?: And Other Studies in Chinese Cultural History. University of Chicago Press. ISBN 978-0-226-12047-8. Archived from the original on 1 September 2023.
- Cummins, Elizabeth (1990). Understanding Ursula K. Le Guin. University of South Carolina Press. ISBN 978-0-87249-687-3.
- Erlich, Richard D. (2010). "Earthsea Revisited: Tehanu". Coyote's Song: The Teaching Stories of Ursula K. Le Guin. Milford series: Popular writers of today. Vol. 72. Wildside Press. ISBN 9781434457752.
- Griffin, Jan M. (Spring 1996). "Ursula LeGuin's Magical World of Earthsea". The ALAN Review. 23 (3). doi:10.21061/alan.v23i3.a.5.
- Le Guin, Ursula K. (1980). The Left Hand of Darkness. Harper & Row. ISBN 978-0-06-012574-5.
- Le Guin, Ursula K. (2012). A Wizard of Earthsea. Houghton Mifflin Harcourt. ISBN 978-0-544-08437-7.
- Phillips, Julie (December 2012). "Ursula K. Le Guin, American Novelist". Bookslut. Archived from the original on January 20, 2017.
- Pollard, Elizabeth; Rosenberg, Clifford; Tignor, Robert (16 December 2014). Worlds Together, Worlds Apart: A History of the World – From the Beginnings of Humankind to the Present. W. W. Norton. p. 164. ISBN 978-0-393-91847-2. Archived from the original on 1 September 2023.
- Slusser, George Edgar (1976). The Farthest Shores of Ursula K. Le Guin. Wildside Press. ISBN 978-0-89370-205-2.
- White, Donna (1999). Dancing with Dragons: Ursula K. Le Guin and the Critics. Camden House. ISBN 1-57113-034-9.
