= Earthsea (disambiguation) =

Earthsea is a series of fantasy books by Ursula K. Le Guin.

It may also refer to:

- Earthsea (universe), the setting of the book series
- Earthsea (miniseries), a 2004 TV adaptation of the books
- Earthsea (radio series), a 2015 radio adaptation by the BBC

== See also ==
- Tales from Earthsea, a collection of short stories by Ursula K. Le Guin
- Tales from Earthsea (film), a Japanese anime by Goro Miyazaki and Studio Ghibli
