= Tales from Earthsea (film) =

2006 anime film by Gorō Miyazaki

- Theatrical release poster

Japanese name
- Kanji: ゲド戦記
- Literal meaning: Ged's War Chronicles
Transcriptions
- Revised Hepburn: Gedo Senki
- Directed by: Gorō Miyazaki
- Screenplay by: Gorō Miyazaki; Keiko Niwa
- Based on: Earthsea by Ursula K. Le Guin; Shuna's Journey by Hayao Miyazaki
- Produced by: Toshio Suzuki
- Starring: Bunta Sugawara; Junichi Okada; Aoi Teshima; Yūko Tanaka
- Cinematography: Atsushi Okui
- Edited by: Takeshi Seyama
- Music by: Tamiya Terashima
- Production company: Studio Ghibli
- Distributed by: Toho
- Release date: July 29, 2006
- Running time: 115 minutes
- Country: Japan
- Language: Japanese
- Budget: $22 million
- Box office: $75.5 million

Tales from Earthsea (Note: Japanese: ゲド戦記, Hepburn: Gedo Senki; lit. 'Ged's War Chronicles') is a 2006 Japanese anime epic fantasy film co-written and directed by Gorō Miyazaki in his directorial debut, animated by Studio Ghibli for the Nippon Television Network, Dentsu, Hakuhodo DY Media Partners, Buena Vista Home Entertainment, Mitsubishi and Toho, and distributed by the latter company. The film is based on a combination of plot and character elements from the first four books of Ursula K. Le Guin's Earthsea series (A Wizard of Earthsea, The Tombs of Atuan, The Farthest Shore, and Tehanu), as well as Hayao Miyazaki's graphic novel Shuna's Journey. The film's English title is taken from the collection of short stories published in 2001.

The film was released in Japan on July 29, 2006. It received mixed reviews from critics, who praised its animation, music and visuals, but criticized the narrative, pacing, and overall differences from the novels. Le Guin herself stated that the plot was "entirely different" from that of her books. She told director Gorō Miyazaki, "It is not my book. It is your movie. It is a good movie", but later expressed her disappointment with the final result. A film comic adaptation of the film has been published in Japan.

== Plot ==
As a war galley sails through a storm, two dragons fight above the clouds, ending in one's death. In the kingdom of Enlad, royal wizard Root proclaims the dragons to be a sign of a loss of balance in the world. The king is dealing with disease sweeping across his kingdom and the disappearance of his son, Prince Arren. For reasons unknown, Arren kills his father, steals his father's sword, and flees the castle.

Arren travels through the desert and is rescued from wolves by the archmage Sparrowhawk. They travel to the city of Hort Town, where Arren rescues a young girl named Therru from the slaver Hare, but is later captured himself. His sword is dumped in the sea. Sparrowhawk rescues Arren and takes him to a farm run by Sparrowhawk's oldest friend Tenar, who lives with Therru.

Sparrowhawk's intervention against Hare's slave caravan angers Lord Cob, a powerful warlock and the ruler of Hort Town. Sparrowhawk tells Arren that he seeks a way to restore the upset balance. He buys Arren's sword from a merchant and evades capture from Hare whilst learning about Cob's castle.

Arren confesses to Therru that he killed his father and feels an unknown presence following him. He is then met by the presence: A mirror image of himself. He flees and falls unconscious after stumbling into a swamp. Cob takes him to the castle, where he manipulates Arren into revealing his "true name", Prince Lebannen, to control him. Hare captures Tenar as bait to lure Sparrowhawk into the castle, leaving Therru tied to a post. However, she later frees herself, and Sparrowhawk gives her Arren's sword. Sparrowhawk breaks into the castle to save Tenar and learns that Cob is causing the world's balance to collapse by opening the door between life and death to gain eternal life. Cob sends Arren out to kill him, but Sparrowhawk frees the prince from Cob's control, only to be captured by Hare.

Therru sees the duplicate of Arren and follows him to the castle, where he reveals that he is the light within Arren and tells Therru his true name. Therru learns of Sparrowhawk and Tenar's sunrise execution. She finds Arren, guilty and hopeless, and brings hope back to him, calling him by his true name and confiding in him her own true name, Tehanu. Arren confronts Cob and finally unsheathes his sword, which was sealed with magic throughout the story. He cuts off Cob's staff-holding hand. Unable to use his magic powers, Cob rapidly begins to age. He captures Therru and flees to the highest tower of the castle. The withering dark lord uses the last of his magic to strangle Therru to death. Instead of dying, she reveals her true form as a dragon, possessing everlasting life. Therru then kills Cob and rescues Arren.

Sparrowhawk and Tenar leave the castle while Therru and Arren land in a field, where Therru changes back into a human. Arren tells Therru he will leave for home to repent for his crime, but he will come back to see her someday. Arren and Sparrowhawk depart for Enlad, bidding Therru and Tenar goodbye. Therru looks up to see her fellow dragons airborne, indicating that the balance of the world has been restored.

== Cast ==
- Bunta Sugawara (Timothy Dalton in the English dub) as Ged/Sparrowhawk, a famous, powerful, wise, and noble sorcerer of Earthsea, known as the Archmage, who is trying to solve the mystery on why the world's Balance is collapsing. He acts as a father-figure to Arren.
- Junichi Okada (Matt Levin in the English dub) as Prince Arren/Lebannen, a seventeen-year-old boy who is followed by a shadow due to his fear of death and the darkness in his heart caused by the collapse of the Balance of the world itself.
- Aoi Teshima (Blaire Restaneo in the English dub) as Therru/Tehanu, a seventeen-year old burn victim who is around the same age as Prince Arren. She was abused and abandoned by her birth parents until Tenar took her in. She originally thought of Arren as immoral and a monster after he saved her from Hare, because he seemed to lack any respect for life, but developed a close friendship with him when she saw his genuine compassion.
- Jun Fubuki (Mariska Hargitay in the English dub) as Tenar, Sparrowhawk's old friend. When she and Sparrowhawk were young, she was a priestess at the Tombs of Atuan until Sparrowhawk guided her to freedom. She raised Therru on her own and accepted Arren and Sparrowhawk into her and Therru's home with open arms.
- Yuko Tanaka (Willem Dafoe in the English dub) as Cob, a maniacal androgynous warlock. Years ago, Sparrowhawk defeated him before he could attempt to control the dead and was, therefore, banished to the Wastelands. Eventually, he escaped and upset the world's Balance in order to try and to gain eternal life.
- Teruyuki Kagawa (Cheech Marin in the English dub) as Hare, Cob's head slaver. Despite being somewhat bumbling and cowardly, he is very loyal to Cob and takes his slaver job seriously.
- Kaoru Kobayashi (Brian George in the English dub) as the King of Enlad and Arren's father. He cares for his kingdom and its well-being.
- Yui Natsukawa (Susanne Blakeslee in the English dub) as the Queen of Enlad and Arren's mother. She is very strict and believes that Arren is old enough to take care of himself.
- Mitsuko Baisho (Kat Cressida in the English dub) as a Cloth Seller, a middle-aged woman who according to herself, used to be a sorceress. Due to the world's Balance collapsing and the people's failing belief in magic, she lost her magic and was reduced to selling cloaks.
- Takashi Naito (Jess Harnell in the English dub) as the Hazia Dealer, who attempted to make Prince Arren try a recreational drug named "hazia", until Sparrowhawk intervened due to its addictive and euphoric qualities (that results in death after excessive consumption).

== Production ==
Tales from Earthsea, from Studio Ghibli, is the first anime film adaptation of any part of the Earthsea series by Ursula K. Le Guin. In the past, many directors, including Hayao Miyazaki, had tried to adapt Earthsea for film, but were disapproved by the author herself. Some 20 years before the release of the film as far as Le Guin recalled (Note: Le Guin's response of 2006, hence c. 1986 by calculation. But actually it was even before the film Nausicaä (released 1984) had been developed, according to Japanese sources.), she had been contacted by the senior Miyazaki (through the bookseller Iwanami Shoten) for permission to adapt her Earthsea into anime, but turned him down since she had not seen any of his films and associated animation with the output of the Walt Disney Company. After some years had passed, Le Guin had seen My Neighbor Totoro (1988) and came to appreciate Miyazaki's work.

Eventually (ca. 2003 (Note: Around 3 years ago according to "Shimada's interview of 2005-12-15)) Le Guin relayed her change of heart and desire to have her work animated through Masako Shimizu, the translator of her works. In the interim, Miyazaki had proceeded with other projects, including the Oscar-winning Spirited Away (2001), and Howl's Moving Castle (2004). By this time, Hayao Miyazaki didn't feel he still had the fire in the belly (enthusiasm) for animating Earthsea, after already having creating many works inspired by it, and showed inclination to decline the offer. However Studio Ghibli producer Toshio Suzuki, who wished to carry the offer through, devised a plan to let Hayao's son Gorō Miyazaki make the film. When Miyazaki learned of the idea, he was initially strongly opposed, thinking that Gorō lacked the necessary experience, saying "He can't possibly handle directing. He probably can't even draw". (Note: 「あいつに監督ができるわけがないだろう。絵だって描けるはずがないし、もっと言えば、何も分かっていないやつなんだ」.) But Suzuki had already been working behind his back, and showed him the storyboard the son had drawn, by way of rebuttal. Miyazaki accompanied the signing of the deal made by the producer and his son, meeting Le Guin and her managing son in person, in June or August 2005. Le Guin was greatly disappointed that Miyazaki himself would not be directing, but agreed to the deal, with the understanding that the senior Miyazaki would have oversight over the whole project. However the producer recalls Hayao Miyazaki only said he would be "held entirely responsible for the script" only. Hayao never once looked at his son's storyboard for the anime, and had remained on non-speaking terms for the duration of the project. (Note: ――駿監督は絵コンテを見たのですか。/鈴木 見ていません。今も混沌とした状態で、二人はまったく口をきいていません。) Hayao did somewhat acknowledge his son's work upon its first preview. Besides the original work, the "original idea" that laid the foundation for the film was Hayao Miyazaki's graphic novel Shuna's Journey, with many direct references, especially the development of characters. One drastic and gruesome deviation from the original novel, the killing of the father king by Arren at the opening of the movie, was producer Suzuki's idea.

=== Music ===
The soundtrack for Tales from Earthsea was composed and managed by Tamiya Terashima and was released by Tokuma Japan Communications and Studio Ghibli Records as a multichannel hybrid SACD-CD on 12 July 2006. Carlos Núñez was a key collaborator on the soundtrack, contributing his ocarina, whistle and Galician gaita (bagpipe) to 11 of the 21 tracks. Newcomer singer, Aoi Teshima, sang in 2 of the tracks. A follow-up album, "Melodies from Gedo Senki", was released on 17 January 2007 and included unreleased Gedo Senki OST tracks and new tracks by Núñez.

== Release ==
=== Theatrical ===
Tales from Earthsea was released in Japan on July 29, 2006. Studio Ghibli released the first and second trailers on its official web site. A three-minute Japanese trailer was first shown in Japanese cinemas starting Saturday 24 February 2006. It was aired on NTV on 23 February 2006 (the day the trailer was completed). Theo Le Guin, Ursula K. Le Guin's son, viewed the Japanese trailer and said this of it: "The images are really beautiful. The song too, it's not like something from Hollywood, but felt really like Ghibli." The trailers were made by Keiichi Itagaki, who had been responsible for trailers for all of the other Ghibli films up until then.

In Australia, Tales from Earthsea premiered in Brisbane on 15 April 2007. The film began a single print tour of major cities on 25 April 2007 and ended up playing at locations in Brisbane, Sydney, Melbourne, Adelaide and Perth over the following months. It was notable that, unlike previous Studio Ghibli releases, only a subtitled version was seen in cinemas.

The film was released in selected UK cinemas on 3 August 2007 by Optimum Releasing, in both subtitled and English dubbed versions. The film was not released as widely as previous Ghibli movies, playing to 23 venues across the nation and making an unremarkable £23,300. Reviews were generally positive, but received mixed reviews when it was compared to the past Ghibli films. Radio Times suggested that it "lacks the technical sheen and warm sentimentality of some of Ghibli's earlier films", while the Daily Mirror called it "ploddy, excruciatingly slow" and not in the same league as the work of Hayao Miyazaki. However, Empire magazine said it was "well worth watching" while The Guardian called it "An engaging piece of work".

In Spain, Tales from Earthsea premiered only in Madrid and Barcelona in two small theaters on 28 December 2007 by Aurum, only in a Japanese version with subtitles (an odd theatrical release compared to previous Ghibli movies).

Walt Disney Studios Motion Pictures released the film in the United States on August 13, 2010, under the Walt Disney Studios banner. Unlike their release of Ponyo (2008) the previous year, Disney opted to give the film a limited release in only five theaters. The film was rated PG-13 by the Motion Picture Association of America for some violent images, making it the first and only animated film released under Disney's name receive a PG-13 rating. It is also the second Studio Ghibli film to receive this rating after Princess Mononoke (1997). The reason for the movie's longer-than-usual release in North America was due to an existing non-compete arrangement with RHI Entertainment, who at the time held the North American rights to Earthsea adaptations and produced the 2004 miniseries Legend of Earthsea (later simply titled Earthsea). RHI (at the time, Hallmark Entertainment) granted a specific rights reversion for Studio Ghibli in 2004 that allowed them to produce the animated movie, with the rights not expiring until December 2008.

=== Home entertainment ===
==== Japan ====
The movie was released on DVD and VHS in Japan by Buena Vista Home Entertainment on July 4, 2007. The DVD included the movie with both the original Japanese soundtrack and English dub, alongside a selection of bonus features. A Special Edition 4-DVD set was also released on the same day, which featured extra language tracks, and more bonus features.

Walt Disney Studios Japan released the film on Blu-ray Disc on November 16, 2011. The company later reissued the DVD with the HD remaster on April 20, 2022.

==== International ====
A 2-disc DVD was released on 12 September 2007 in Australia by Madman Entertainment, this time featuring both the English and Japanese versions.

Optimum Releasing released both the subtitled and dub, region 2 DVD for the UK market on 28 January 2008. To mark the release, HMV ran frequent sponsor credits for the DVD, as well as a prize competition, on the AnimeCentral channel. StudioCanal UK released the film on Blu-ray on June 25, 2012.

In the United States, Walt Disney Studios Home Entertainment released the film on DVD on March 8, 2011. The company later released the movie on Blu-ray Disc on February 3, 2015. GKIDS re-issued the film on Blu-ray and DVD on February 6, 2018, under a new deal with Studio Ghibli.

A single DVD and a special 2-disc DVD were released by Aurum on 12 March 2008, this time with a Spanish soundtrack included.

== Reception ==
=== Box office ===
The film reached No. 1 at the Japanese box office on its opening week, with a gross of over 900 million yen, or 7.7 million USD, pushing Pirates of the Caribbean: Dead Man's Chest to second place and becoming the number one movie in the country for five weeks. It became the year's #4 top-grossing movie in Japan, and the year's highest-grossing domestic Japanese film, with ¥7.65 billion. As of 2020, it has grossed ¥7.84 billion in Japan and $75.5 million worldwide.

=== Critical response ===
The critical reception in Japan was favorable but mixed when compared to that of other Ghibli movies. Gorō was presented at the Bunshun Kiichigo Awards (Raspberry Awards) ceremony for the worst films in Japan, earning a Raspberry Award for "Worst Director", with Tales from Earthsea receiving the award for "Worst Movie" at the end of 2006. It was nominated in 2007 for the Japan Academy Prize for Animation of the Year (losing to The Girl Who Leapt Through Time) and was selected in the Out of Competition section at the 63rd Venice Film Festival.

Rotten Tomatoes reported that 37% of critics have given the film a positive review based on 41 critics with an average rating of 5.4/10. It was the lowest-rated film produced by Studio Ghibli on the website, up until Earwig and the Witch (2020), which was also directed by Gorō. On Metacritic, it has a weighted average score of 47 out of 100 based on 11 critic reviews, indicating "mixed or average reviews".

Stephen Holden of The New York Times gave the film a score of 2.5/5, writing, "If this starchy, nearly two-hour allegory about human hubris bluntly addresses a historical moment when global warming threatens the planet and pollution is fouling the seas, its chilly, formal tone keeps you at an emotional distance." The San Francisco Chronicle's Peter Hartlaub wrote, "The themes and memorable imagery in Earthsea will be familiar to fans of Studio Ghibli, but the storytelling and animation are a step behind. This film is too scary for very young children, while older fans are likely to focus on the film not faring well in comparison to the elder Miyazaki's recent work."

Kyle Smith of the New York Post was more positive, writing, "this utterly earnest, philosophy-drenched story recombines its borrowed elements in imaginative ways to create a frequently gripping effect that builds to a rich climax. Thanks in part to a generous, Irish-tinged score, even scenes in which characters merely stand quietly in rustling fields seem fraught with somber majesty. The Miyazaki legacy is in good hands."

=== Other responses ===
During a screening of the film, Gorō's father, Hayao Miyazaki, walked out for a smoke break, commenting, "You shouldn't make a picture based on your emotions". When asked his thoughts, he said, "I was looking at my kid. He's not an adult yet. That is all." He later wrote a message for his son: "It was made honestly, so it was good".

While Le Guin was positive about the aesthetic of the film, writing that "much of it was beautiful", she took great issue with its reimagining of the books' moral sense and its greater focus on physical violence. "[E]vil has been comfortably externalized in a villain", Le Guin writes, "the wizard Kumo/Cob, who can simply be killed, thus solving all problems. In modern fantasy (literary or governmental), killing people is the usual solution to the so-called war between good and evil. My books are not conceived in terms of such a war, and offer no simple answers to simplistic questions". She stated that the plot departed so greatly from her story that she was "watching an entirely different story, confusingly enacted by people with the same names as in my story". She did praise certain depictions of nature in the film, but felt that its production values were not as high as previous works directed by Hayao Miyazaki, and that the film's excitement was focused too much around scenes of violence. Her initial response to Gorō Miyazaki was, "It is not my book. It is your movie. It is a good movie". However, she stated that the comment disclosed on the movie's public blog did not portray her true feelings about the film's vast departure from original stories; "taking bits and pieces out of context, and replacing the storylines with an entirely different plot..."
