= List of Earthsea characters =

This is a list of the names of characters in the stories about the fantasy world of Earthsea, created by Ursula K. Le Guin.

== Nomenclature ==
In Earthsea, each individual among the Hardic peoples has several names over the course of their life: a child-name, a use-name and a true name. Up to puberty, a person is known by their child-name; at their rite of Passage, at about the age of thirteen, that name is taken from them and they are given their true name in the Old Speech by a witch, sorcerer, or wizard. One's true name is a closely guarded secret shared only with those whom they trust completely because it grants the knower control over the person. A use-name is adopted for everyday dealings. It may be an animal (Dragonfly, Hare, Otter, Sparrowhawk), a plant (Alder, Heather, Moss, Rowan), a substance (Diamond, Flint, Ivory, Jasper, Onyx) or something else (Golden, Kurremkarmerruk, the latter having no meaning). Use-names are not unique; there are, for instance, three different characters called Rose.

Kargs, who hate magic, do not use this system of naming. They have single names (Azver, Seserakh, Tenar).

Dragons also have true names. As a young, inexperienced wizard, Ged (use-name Sparrowhawk) is able to bargain with an ancient, powerful dragon on equal terms because he has guessed the latter's true name.

In the list below, true names are used where known, otherwise use-names and nicknames. A secondary list below gives the use-names and child-names of those whose true names are known.

== Names ==
True names are shown in red, use names in blue. Child names, names of unknown status and nicknames are in green. Kargish names are in orange. Titles in parentheses are the novels or stories in which the character appears.

A

- Aihal – Aihal is a wizard on Gont, student of Heleth and master of Ged; called Ogion /ˈoʊɡiːɒn/. ("The Bones of the Earth")
- Akaren – Akaren is a dyer of Lorbanery, who lost her magical powers. (The Farthest Shore)
- Anieb – Anieb is a woman of the Hand, called Flag. ("The Finder")
- Ard – Ard is the Mage of Perregal, master of Heleth. Created Ard's lore-books. A female mage.
- Ath – Ath is the mage who wrote the first Book of Names.
- Ayeth – Ayeth is a sorcerer on Semel. Called Sunbright. ("On the High Marsh")
- Ayo — Ayo is a woman of the Hand, on Havnor, mother of Anieb. ("The Finder")
- Azver – Azver is the Master Patterner of Roke, from Karego-At. Means "banner of war" in Kargish. ("Dragonfly")

B

- Beech – Beech is a sorcerer of Valmouth. (Tehanu)
- Benderesk – Benderesk is Lord of the Terrenon in Osskil, husband of Serret. (A Wizard of Earthsea)
- Blackbeard – Blackbeard is a mage, descendant of the Sealords of Pendor, who challenges Yevaud. ("The Rule of Names")
- Brand – Brand is Master Summoner of Roke after Thorion. (The Other Wind)

C

- Cob – Cob is a powerful wizard who endangers all Earthsea by jamming open the door between life and death in a futile effort to live forever; in undoing what he has done, the Archmage Ged sacrifices all his magical powers. (The Farthest Shore)
- Crow — Crow is a dedicated book collector from Hosk. ("The Finder")

D

- Deyala – Deyala is the Master Herbal of Roke. ("Dragonfly")
- Duby – Duby is a eunuch at the Place of the Tombs. (The Tombs of Atuan)
- Dune – Dune is an old wizard on Roke, friend of Elehal and Yahan.

E

- Elehal – Elehal is a mage on Roke, called Ember, partner of Medra, sister of Yahan. ("The Finder")
- Elfarran – Elfarran is the Islewoman or Lady of Soléa, the wife of Morred and the mother of Serriadh.
- Elt – Elt is a wizard wise in names.
- Emer – Emer is a woman of Semel. Called Gift. ("On the High Marsh")
- Enemy of Morred - The Enemy of Morred is an unnamed mage of great power who fought Morred.
- Ennas – Ennas is Great Mage of Perregal, from whom Ard's lore-books came.
- Erisen – Erisen is a twisted mage and follower of Cob. Called Aspen. (Tehanu)
- Erreth-Akbe – Erreth-Akbe is Hero-mage of Havnor, companion of King Maharion. Erreth-Akbe lived many centuries before the primary events that take place in the Earthsea novels. Erreth-Akbe was a famous hero and a great sorcerer, as well as counselor and good friend to King Maharion. Erreth-Akbe was a ‘dragonlord’, i.e. esteemed well enough by some dragons that they were willing to speak with him.
- Essiri – Essiri is a gifted man of Havnor, who abandons wizardry for musicianship. The word means "willow" in the Old Speech. Called Diamond. ("Darkrose and Diamond")
- Estarriol – Estarriol is a mage of Iffish, friend of Ged. Called Vetch. Older brother of Murre and Yarrow. (A Wizard of Earthsea)
- Etaudis – Etaudis is a witch on Way. Called Rose. ("Dragonfly")

F

- Firelord – Firelord is a mage of great power who attacked the inner Isles as he sought to stop the sun at noon. Defeated by Erreth-Akbe. Thought to have perhaps been a dragon.
- Flint – Flint is the husband of Tenar. (Tehanu)

G

- Gamble – Gamble is a student on Roke. Later becomes the Master Windkey. (The Farthest Shore, The Other Wind)
- Ged – Ged /ˈɡɛd/ is Archmage of Roke. Called Sparrowhawk. His child-name was Duny.
- Gensher – Gensher of Way is Archmage of Roke after Nemmerle. (A Wizard of Earthsea)
- Golden – Golden is a merchant of Glade, Havnor, husband of Tuly, father of Essiri. ("Darkrose and Diamond")
- Gray Mage – The Gray Mage is a mage from Paln who made great spells (the Lore of Paln) to summon the spirits of the dead to counsel the Lords of Paln a thousand years before the time of the novels.

H

- Hara – Hara is a sorcerer from Taon, called Alder. (The Other Wind)
- Hare – Hare is a former wizard in Wathort, follower of Cob. (The Farthest Shore)
- Hayohe – Hayohe is the daughter of Flint and Tenar. Called Apple. (Tehanu)
- Hemlock – Hemlock is a wizard of South Port, Havnor. ("Darkrose and Diamond")
- Hatha – Hatha is a witch of Re Albi. Called Moss. (Tehanu)
- Heather – Heather is a goatherd at Re Albi. (Tehanu)
- Heleth – Heleth Farseer is Master of Aihal. Called Dulse. ("The Bones of the Earth")
- Highdrake – Highdrake is a mage of Pendor who taught Medra. ("The Finder")
- Hoeg – Hoeg /ˈhoʊˌɛɡ/ is a pet otak /ˈoʊˌtæk/ of Ged's. (A Wizard of Earthsea)
- Hound – Hound is a mage gifted in finding and tracking, servant to Tinaral and Teriel. ("The Finder")

I

- Ioeth – Ioeth is the child-name of a son of Pechvarry. (A Wizard of Earthsea)
- Irian – see Orm Irian
- Irioth – Irioth is a powerful summoner who loses his mind. Called Otak. ("On the High Marsh")
- Ivory – Ivory is a sorcerer from Havnor who pretends to be a wizard on Way. ("Dragonfly")
- Ivy – Ivy is a witch of Middle Valley. (Tehanu)

J

- Jasper – Jasper is a sorcerer of O. Son of Enwit, born in the domain of Eolg, Havnor. Childhood rival of Ged. (A Wizard of Earthsea)

K

- Kalessin – Kalessin is the eldest dragon. S/he flies Ged and Arren home after they defeat Cob. Once called Segoy, suggesting a similarity or identity to the creator-deity of the songs and legends of Earthsea. (Tehanu)
- Kest – Kest is a woman of Iffish, called Yarrow. Yarrow is the younger sister of Vetch and Murre. The word means "minnow" in the Old Speech. (A Wizard of Earthsea)
- Kossil – Kossil is a corrupt priestess of the God-king at the Place of the Tombs. (The Tombs of Atuan)
- Kurremkarmerruk – Kurremkarmerruk /ˌkʊrəmkɑːrˈmɛrək/ is the name used by the Master Namers of Roke.

L

- Lark – Lark is a woman of Middle Valley, friend of Tenar. (Tehanu)
- Lebannen – Lebannen is king of Earthsea. The name means "rowan tree" in the Old Speech. Called Arren. The word means "sword" in his nation.
- Lord of Re Albi – The Lord of Re Albi is a pirate-lord of Gont, father of Serret.
- Licky — Licky is a slavemaster at the Samory mines in Havnor, servant of Tinaral.
- Littleash — Littleash is the brother of Rose, uncle of Medra, from Endlane in Havnor. ("The Finder")
- Losen – Losen is 'king' or warlord of Havnor in the Dark Years.

M

- Maharion – Maharion is the last king of Earthsea before Lebannen
- Manan – Manan is a eunuch at the Place of the Tombs of Atuan. (The Tombs of Atuan)
- Mebbeth – Mebbeth is a priestess at the Place of the Tombs. (The Tombs of Atuan)
- Mead — Mead is a woman of the Hand on Havnor, sister of Ayo. ("The Finder")
- Medra – Medra is the first Master Finder and Doorkeeper of Roke. Called Otter and Tern. ("The Finder")
- Mevre – Mevre is a witch on Taon, married to Hara, called Lily. (The Other Wind)
- Morred – Morred is the Mage-King of Enlad, ancestor of some of the kings of Earthsea. Also known as "The Young King".
- Murre – Murre is the younger brother of Estarriol and Kest (middle sibling). (A Wizard of Earthsea)

N

- Nemmerle – Nemmerle is Archmage of Roke when Ged is young. Formerly the Master Patterner. (A Wizard of Earthsea)
- Nereger – Nereger is a mage of Paln.
- Nesty — Nesty is a woman from Firn, in Havnor ("The Finder")

O

- Onyx – Onyx is a wizard of Roke (The Other Wind)
- Orm – Orm is a dragon of the West Reach. Slayer of Erreth-Akbe.
- Orm Embar – Orm Embar is a powerful dragon of the West Reach descended from Orm. Frees Ged to overcome Cob, sacrificing himself in order to crush Cob's body. (The Farthest Shore)
- Orm Irian – Orm Irian is a dragon-woman. Called Dragonfly. ("Dragonfly")

P

- Pechvarry – Pechvarry is a boatmaker of the Ninety Isles. He befriends Ged when Ged first arrives. Ged fails to save his sick son Ioeth. (A Wizard of Earthsea)
- Penthe – Penthe is a trainee priestess at the Place of the Tombs. Friend of Tenar. (The Tombs of Atuan)

R

- Red Mage of Ark
- Rose — Rose is the mother of Medra. ("The Finder")
- Rose – Rose is a woman on Havnor, beloved of Essiri, daughter of Tangle. Also called Darkrose. ("Darkrose and Diamond")
- Rose – Rose is the mother of Lebannen, from Endlane in Havnor. (The Farthest Shore)
- Rowan — Rowan is the mother of Rose, grandmother of Medra. ("The Finder")

S

- Segoy – Segoy is the creator of Earthsea, from the time before humans and dragons became separate beings (The Other Wind)
- Seppel – Seppel is a wizard of Paln (The Other Wind)
- Serrathen – Serrathen is captain of the King's Ship the Dolphin. (Tehanu)
- Serret – Serret is the daughter of the Lord of Re Albi, wife of Benderesk. The name means "silver" in Osskilian. (A Wizard of Earthsea)
- Serriadh – Serriadh is the son of Morred and Elfarran.
- Seserakh – Seserakh is a Kargish princess, daughter of Thol. (The Other Wind)
- Skiorh – Skiorh is an Osskilian who becomes possessed by the shadow that is unwittingly released into Earthsea by Ged. (A Wizard of Earthsea)
- Spark - Spark is a sailor son of Flint and Tenar. (Tehanu)
- Sopli – Sopli is a dyer of Lorbanery who goes mad. He accompanies Ged and Arren on their quest, but drowns himself soon after. Son of Akaren. (The Farthest Shore)

T

- Tangle – Tangle is a witch on Havnor, mother of Rose. ("Darkrose and Diamond")
- Tehanu – Tehanu /təˈhɑːnuː/ is burned child, a woman-dragon. Called Therru. (Tehanu, The Other Wind)
- Tenar – Tenar /təˈnɑːr/ is the Priestess of the Tombs of Atuan, White Lady of Gont. Called Arha and Goha. (The Tombs of Atuan, Tehanu, The Other Wind)
- Teriel – Teriel is a mage of Havnor in the dark years. Called Early. ("The Finder")
- Thar – Thar is a priestess of the Twin Gods at the Place of the Tombs. (The Tombs of Atuan)
- Thol – Thol is king of the Kargad lands (The Other Wind)
- Thorion – Thorion is Master Summoner on Roke.
- Tinaral – Tinaral is a mad wizard of Havnor. Called Gelluk. ("The Finder")
- Tuly – Tuly is a woman on Havnor, wife of Golden. ("Darkrose and Diamond")

U

- Uahto – Uahto is a eunuch at the place of the Tombs. (The Tombs of Atuan)

Y

- Yahan – Yahan is a mage on Roke, sister of Elehal. Called Veil. ("The Finder")
- Yevaud – Yevaud is the Dragon of Pendor. ("The Rule of Names", A Wizard of Earthsea)

== Use-names and child-names ==
- Alder – Hara
- Apple – Hayohe
- Arha – Tenar, when she was priestess of the Tombs of Atuan. Arha means "eaten" in Kargish.
- Arren – Lebannen, before he became king. Arren means "sword" in the Hardic dialect of Enlad.
- Aspen – Erisen
- Diamond – Essiri. For short, "Di".
- Dragonfly – Orm Irian.
- Dulse – Heleth
- Duny – child-name of Ged
- Early – Teriel
- Ember – Elehal
- Flag – Anieb
- Gelluk – Tinaral: an Osskilian name.
- Gift – Emer
- Goha – Tenar, after she had settled on Gont. Goha is a word for a white web-spinning spider in Hardic.
- Gully – Irioth. Transient use-name.
- Hawk – Ged, when he sailed the South Reach in disguise.
- Kelub – Ged, when he rowed on an Osskilian galley. Kelub means "red" in Osskilian.
- Lily – Mevre
- Moss – Hatha
- Ogion – Aihal. Ogion means "fir-cone" in Hardic.
- Otak – Irioth
- Otter – Medra, during his youth in Havnor.
- Rose – Etaudis.
- Silence – Aihal, when he was serving Heleth.
- Sparrowhawk – Ged
- Sunbright – Ayeth
- Tern – Medra, when he dwelt in Roke.
- Therru – Tehanu. Therru means "burning" or "flaming" in Kargish.
- Underhill – Yevaud, when he dwelt on Sattins island.
- Veil – Yahan
- Vetch – Estarriol
- Yarrow – Kest

== Erreth-Akbe ==
Introduced in A Wizard of Earthsea, Erreth-Akbe is one of the most important characters in the historical back-story of the Earthsea novels.

Erreth-Akbe lived many centuries before the primary events that take place in the Earthsea novels. Erreth-Akbe was a famous hero and a great sorcerer, as well asa counselelor and good friend to King Maharion. Erreth-Akbe was a "dragonlord", i.e., esteemed well enough by dragons that they were willing to speak with him.

Erreth-Akbe defeated the Firelord, who sought to conquer the lands of the Inner Sea and stop the sun at midday, resulting in perpetual daylight.

In 440, he carried the Ring of Morred (known also as Elfarran's ring, later to be called the Ring of Erreth-Akbe) to King Thoreg of the Kargs, as a sign of peace between the Archipelago and the Kargad Lands. However, he found himself in the midst of a coup, organised by a Kargish High Priest, who broke the ring in half. Half of the ring was passed along the descendants of the Kargish royalty and eventually lost generations later when the last descendants were exiled to a remote unnamed and uncharted isle, while the other half was sequestered by Kargish priests in the Tombs of Atuan.

In 448, Erreth-Akbe fought the ancient dragon Orm on Selidor, the remotest island in the West Reach. The battle resulted in the death of both Orm and Erreth-Akbe.

Later, after Ged found half of the Ring of Erreth-Akbe, he met the dragon Orm Embar, descendant of Orm, on Selidor. Orm Embar told Ged the history of the ring half he carried. When Ged was an archmage, he met the ghost of Erreth-Akbe summoned by Cob, in the place where the hero died.

The dragons on Selidor and in the West Reach remember Erreth-Akbe and respect him. Ged later said of his meeting with Orm Embar:

"He thought it very funny that I hadn't known. Dragons think we are amusing. But they remember Erreth-Akbe; him they speak of as if he were a dragon, not a man."
