= The Other Wind =

2001 fantasy novel by Ursula K. Le Guin

- Cover of first edition (hardcover)
- Author: Ursula K. Le Guin
- Language: English
- Series: Earthsea
- Release number: 5
- Genre: Fantasy
- Published: 2001 (Harcourt Brace & Company)
- Publication place: United States
- Media type: Print (hardcover & paperback)
- Pages: 246
- ISBN: 0-15-100684-9
- OCLC: 46777444
- Dewey Decimal: 813/.54 21
- LC Class: PS3562.E42 O84 2001
- Preceded by: Tales from Earthsea

The Other Wind is a fantasy novel by the American author Ursula K. Le Guin, published by Harcourt in 2001. It is the fifth and final novel set in the fictional archipelago Earthsea. The novel won the annual World Fantasy Award for Best Novel, and it was runner-up for the Locus Award for Best Fantasy Novel, among other nominations.

The Other Wind is a sequel to Tehanu, the fourth novel in the Earthsea series, and to "Dragonfly", a story in the collection Tales from Earthsea.

== Plot ==
Alder, a minor village sorcerer who is adept at mending, has been tormented by dreams since the death of his beloved wife Lily. Every time he falls asleep, he is brought to the wall of stones, the border between the world of the living and the Dry Land of the dead. The dead, including Lily, beseech him to be set free. He sought guidance from the masters of the school of wizardry on Roke island. The Master Patterner advises him to seek out Ged on the island of Gont. Ged, the ex-Archmage, is powerless as a wizard, but knows more of the world of the dead than anyone living. Alder finds Ged, who is alone at the time, as his Kargish wife Tenar and adopted daughter Tehanu have been summoned to Havnor to counsel King Lebannen. Ged listens to Alder's tale and recommends he go to Havnor to speak to both the king and his family.

Alder sails to the big island of Havnor and tells his story to the already assembled council. Lebannen is concerned, but has other worries. The king of the Kargs, a warlike people from the East who despise sorcery, has sent his daughter to marry Lebannen as the price for peace between them, a demand that angers Lebannen. Furthermore, dragons have been menacing the islands in the archipelago closest to their territory on the western-most islands. Soon after Alder arrives, dragons encroach further into the archipelago than ever before, finally to Havnor itself. The king and his people ride to negotiate with them. Tehanu goes with him because she appears to have some kinship with dragons, having as a young girl summoned the great dragon Kalessin, who called her ‘daughter’, but is now departed, “flying on the other wind”. She speaks to one of the raiding dragons who delivers a cryptic message, to the effect that the dragons are angry that men have stolen part of their lands in the furthest west. The dragons do, however, agree to a truce, and to send an emissary.

The dragon Orm Irian arrives shortly after, taking human form of a young woman to address the king and his council. The legends of the dragons, the mages, and the Kargs are retold and compared. It is revealed that dragons and men were once one people, but parted ways: Dragons chose a life of freedom and immortality in the Furthest West, while men chose a life of mastery, power, and rebirth, promising to give up magic. However, men reneged on their bargain, and the first mages cast spells that stole some of the beautiful Western Lands from the dragons, for men to go to after death. But in their attempt to create an eternal life, the old mages had instead created the Dry Land, a grim, unchanging, desolate place where their souls languished forever. The party decide to sail to Roke, the center of the world, to seek a resolution.

The King's party debates with the masters of the great school of magic on what course of action to take. The two groups travel together magically to the Dry Lands to the Wall of Stones, which the dead are vainly attempting to tear down. Alder begins to dislodge a stone, each stone in the wall as seen in the Dry Lands being one of the spells used to carve it out of the dragons' Western Lands. Alder is joined by Tehanu, then the others, each using magic to unmake the wall. Once the wall is sufficiently breached, the imprisoned dead rush free to return to the cycle of life, death, and rebirth, and Alder is reunited with his wife Lily and dies. The dragon Kalessin arrives and completes the demolition, and the Dry Land returns to its beauty and is rejoined with the dragons' Western Lands. Tehanu is finally able to transform into an uncrippled dragon.

After the balance of the world is restored, the king marries the Kargish princess, whom he has come to love and admire, and Tenar returns to Gont and to Ged.

== Reception ==
Fantasy Book Review calls The Other Wind wonderful, examining themes of "fear of death and belief in reincarnation", unafraid to examine darker subjects than are usual in fiction for young adults. It suggests that Le Guin is stating her own views here, but without preaching. Mary Anne Mohanraj, in Reactor, notes Le Guin's comment that she realised after Tehanu that she had not finished with Earthsea, despite that book's subtitle. Instead, through The Other Wind, she was "able to find out who Tehanu is—and who the dragons are".

The Belgian philosopher Isabelle Stengers writes that in the novel, the Doorkeeper speaks of "The choice of mastery, which divided humans from dragons, might have brought on catastrophe, but it also implies the joy of creation, of fashioning". Stengers comments that this can be Le Guin's voice too, writing of "all arts of creation, including scientific and technical ones", adding that "of course" Le Guin is also writing about "her own art", that of "fashioning words and sentences". The scholar of English Nicholas Taylor-Collins writes that The Other Wind, like Philip Pullman's His Dark Materials, joins the ancient category of books about visiting the land of the dead, from Homer's Iliad and Odyssey onwards.
