= Earthsea (miniseries) =

2004 American TV miniseries by Robert Lieberman

- DVD cover
- Also known as: Legend of Earthsea
- Genre: Adventure; Fantasy; Literary adaptation
- Based on: Earthsea by Ursula K. Le Guin
- Written by: Gavin Scott
- Directed by: Robert Lieberman
- Starring: Shawn Ashmore; Kristin Kreuk; Danny Glover; Isabella Rossellini; Sebastian Roché; Chris Gauthier
- Music by: Jeff Rona
- Countries of origin: United States; Canada
- Original language: English
- No. of episodes: 2

Production
- Executive producers: Lawrence Bender; Kevin Kelly Brown; Robert Halmi; Robert A. Halmi
- Producers: Matthew O’Connor; Michael O'Connor; Dianna Oliva-Day
- Cinematography: Steve Danyluk
- Editor: Allan Lee
- Running time: 172 minutes
- Production companies: Hallmark Entertainment; Bender-Brown Productions

Original release
- Network: Sci-Fi
- Release: 13 December – 14 December 2004

Legend of Earthsea (later shortened to Earthsea) is a two-part television fantasy miniseries produced for the Sci-Fi Channel by Hallmark Entertainment in association with Bender-Brown Productions, which aired in 2004. It is loosely based on the Earthsea novels by Ursula K. Le Guin. The teleplay was written by Gavin Scott, and the series was directed by Robert Lieberman. Legend of Earthsea is an American-Canadian co-production that was filmed on location in Vancouver, British Columbia.

Combining the plots of the first two Earthsea novels, A Wizard of Earthsea and The Tombs of Atuan, the story follows Ged (Shawn Ashmore), a powerful but reckless mage-in-training, and Tenar (Kristin Kreuk), a young priestess, who are drawn together in a battle against an ancient race of demons known as the Nameless Ones. The cast also features Danny Glover, Isabella Rossellini, Sebastian Roché and Chris Gauthier.

Legends of Earthsea aired over two consecutive nights in December 2004. It received generally negative reviews from both critics and fans of the original novels, and it was heavily criticized for its numerous deviations from them. Even so, it won seven Leo Awards and was nominated for a Primetime Emmy Award for Outstanding Special Visual Effects. Le Guin stated that she had been cut out of the creative process for Legends of Earthsea and that she did not approve of the miniseries.

== Plot ==
In the land of Earthsea, a young wizard named Ged has visions about a girl and doors opening. Meanwhile, King Tygath wants to rule the land and release the Nameless Ones, demons from whom he hopes to learn the secret of immortality. He sends men to attack Ged's village, in search of the wizard of prophecy (Ged). Ged learns his first spell from an elderly woman. When the invasion comes, Ged uses a mist spell and lures the invaders over a cliff, saving the village. However, Ged also falls off the cliff.

Tygath tries to convince High Priestess Thar to release the Nameless Ones, but she refuses. She is poisoned by Rosa, her attendant who has been tricked by the king's lover, Kossil, every time she has tea.

A magus named Ogion arrives at Ged's village and revives Ged. He tells Ged his true name and takes him for training, but Ged is too impatient; he is sent to the magic school on Roke. There he meets the bully, Jasper, and befriends a student named Vetch. Ged shapeshifts into a hawk to show off. Jasper then challenges him to raise a spirit from the dead, leading him to accidentally release a Nameless One. The demon attacks Ged before being driven away by the Archmagus, who tells him that this Nameless One will hunt Ged down and try to possess him, using Ged's power for further destruction. Ged must go somewhere in hiding until he can find its true name and destroy it.

With the help of Jasper, King Tygath takes control of the magic school. He throws a knife at the Archmagus, apparently killing him and making Jasper the new Archmagus.

With the help of Ogion, Ged confronts the Gebbeth and attempts to drown him using a rock, however, it escapes with Ged's likeness and voice. Ged's impersonator becomes a murderer, and Vetch, a magus himself, chases Ged until he realizes Ged is not possessed by the Gebbeth and they decide to hunt it together.

They are attacked by the dragon, Orm Embar, but Ged uses the dragon's true name to bind him and ask three questions. He wastes his first question, but with his second, he learns the Gebbeth's location. The dragon tells him where to find the two pieces of the Amulet of Peace, which when reunited would save Earthsea, but Ged could have asked the true name of the demon.

Meanwhile, Thar appoints a successor, Tenar, and tells her the incantation to release the Nameless Ones. Kossil strangles Rosa and frames Tenar, leading to her imprisonment.

Ged and Vetch return to Roke for help in decoding the dragon's riddle. The Archmagus survived Tygath's attack and made the real Jasper into a village fool as punishment. He sends Ged and Vetch to unseal the Nameless Tombs on Atuan, but Ged is captured and brought before Thar, who mistakes him for an evil wizard.

In the labyrinth, Ged is locked in the cell next to Tenar. They break free and recognize each other from their visions. Thar realizes her mistake right before her death. Kossil tries to force Tenar to reveal the incantation and fails, so Tygath kills Kossil and follows Tenar to the gate of the Nameless Ones.

Vetch finds the tomb first and is taken by the Gebbeth. Ged encounters Tygath in the labyrinth and fights him but then escapes into the tomb. He encounters the Gebbeth and realizes its true name is his own, because it is the darkness in himself. The demon is absorbed into Ged, making him whole again and strengthening him to strike Tygath in the tomb. Tygath threatens Tenar to release the Nameless Ones, but she refuses, remaining true to her faith. Ged then requests Tenar to go ahead and release them. He tells her to look into his eyes, in trust. She recites the incantation, releasing the Nameless Ones. The Nameless Ones, then, take Tygath into the sky before flying off. Ged reveals part of the key is the second half of the amulet. The Amulet of Peace is made whole, dispelling the Nameless Ones with a bright light and restoring peace to Earthsea. Ged is seen victorious with Tenar and they kiss.

== Cast ==
=== Main characters ===
- Shawn Ashmore as Ged / Sparrowhawk, a young mage-in-training
- Kristin Kreuk as Tenar, a priestess of Atuan
- Danny Glover as Ogion, a Master Mage and Ged’s mentor
- Isabella Rossellini as Thar, the high priestess of Atuan and Tenar's mentor
- Sebastian Roché as King Tygath, the power-hungry ruler of the Kargides. He is an original character created for the series.
- Jennifer Calvert as Kossil, a priestess of Atuan and secret lover of Tygath.
- Chris Gauthier as Vetch, a mage-in-training and Ged’s friend
- Mark Acheson as The Gebbeth, the Nameless One that comes after Ged

=== Supporting characters ===
- Alan Scarfe as the Archmagus, headmaster of Roke Academy
- Mark Hildreth as Jasper, a mage-in-training and the school bully
- Dave 'Squatch' Ward as Dunian, Ged's father
- Alessandro Juliani as Skiorh, Ged's friend
- Katharine Isabelle as Yarrow, Vetch’s younger sister
- Amanda Tapping as Lady Elfarren, a priestess-mage who imprisoned the Nameless Ones ages ago
- Erin Karpluk as Diana
- Emily Hampshire as Rosa
- John Tench as General Doar
- Alex Diakun as Thorvald
- Heather Laura Gray as Penelope
- Betty Phillips as Marion
- William Samples as Doctor Hand
- Antony Holland as Master Namer
- R. Nelson Brown as Master Herbal
- Chris Britton as Master Summoner
- Frank C. Turner as Avner
- Stefan Arngrim as Shire Reeve

== Production ==
The series was produced by Hallmark Entertainment in association with Bender-Brown Productions. It was adapted by Gavin Scott (The Mists of Avalon) from the Earthsea novels for executive producers Robert Halmi, Sr. (Merlin, Gulliver's Travels, Animal Farm), Lawrence Bender (Kill Bill, Pulp Fiction) and Kevin Kelly Brown (Roswell).

The series was filmed in Vancouver, British Columbia, Canada.

== Critical reception ==
Reviewing the miniseries, the book The Ultimate Encyclopedia of Fantasy claimed that Legend of Earthsea "totally missed the point" of Le Guin's novels, "ripping out all the subtlety, nuance and beauty of the books and inserting boring cliches, painful stereotypes and a very unwelcome 'epic' war in their place". The Moria website's review of "Legend of Earthsea" states "Earthsea feels exactly like tv filler. In the books, Ursula Le Guin expended a great deal of time creating a world with a depth and culture, but nothing of this survives in the mini-series". The review added that Legend of Earthsea was "shabbily and indifferently directed", and that the dialogue was "dreadfully clunky and often excruciatingly bad".

== Author's response ==
Le Guin, author of the novels on which the miniseries is based, was not involved in the development of the material or the making of the production. She has written a number of responses to the handling of this adaptation of her works, including "A Whitewashed Earthsea" and "Frankenstein's Earthsea." She noted that when she sold the rights to Earthsea, her contract gave her "the standard status of 'consultant'—which means whatever the producers want it to mean, almost always little or nothing". Le Guin has accused the Sci-Fi Channel of having "wrecked" her books and of having removed the "crucial element" of race from them. She asserted that when she reviewed the script for the miniseries, she "realized the producers had no understanding of what the books are about and no interest in finding out. All they intended was to use the name Earthsea, and some of the scenes from the books, in a generic McMagic movie with a meaningless plot based on sex and violence".
