= Earthsea (universe) =

Fictional world created by Ursula K. Le Guin

- Author: Ursula K. Le Guin
- Country: USA
- Language: English
- Genre: Fantasy
- Published: January 1964 - October 2018

Earthsea is a fictional world created by American writer Ursula K. Le Guin. Introduced in her short story "The Word of Unbinding", published in 1964, Earthsea became the setting for six Earthsea books, beginning with A Wizard of Earthsea, first published in 1968, and continuing with The Tombs of Atuan, The Farthest Shore, Tehanu, Tales from Earthsea and The Other Wind. Nine short stories by Le Guin are set in Earthsea; the earliest two ('"The Word of Unbinding'" and "The Rule of Names") in her 1975 collection of short stories The Wind's Twelve Quarters, five in Tales from Earthsea, and the final two (2014's '"The Daughter of Odren'" and 2018's "Firelight") in an illustrated collection (along with the 1993 essay Earthsea Revisioned) in The Books of Earthsea (released in 2018 to celebrate the 50th anniversary of A Wizard of Earthsea).

== Geography and Climate ==
The planet of Earthsea is one of sea and islands: a vast archipelago of hundreds of islands surrounded by mostly uncharted ocean. Earthsea contains no large continents. The largest island, Havnor, at approximately 380 miles (610 km) across, is about the size of Great Britain. The overall climate of Earthsea is temperate, comparable to the mid-latitudes of the northern hemisphere of Earth. There is a yearly transition from warm summers to cold and snowy winters, especially on northern islands like Gont and Osskil. In the southern regions of Earthsea, it can be much warmer.

== People and cultures ==
The cultures of Earthsea are not direct analogues of those of the real world, but are literate non-industrial civilizations.

=== Ethnic groups ===
The racial characteristics of the people of Earthsea are for the most part "red-brown" in coloring; in the South and East Reach and on Way, they are much darker brown, and with straight black hair; in Osskil, they have light skin, presumably with skin that is lighter in comparison to lands to the south of Osskil such as Gont or Havnor, and the Kargs of the northeastern islands, seen by the Hardic peoples as barbarians, have blonde hair and white skin.

Le Guin has criticized what she describes as the general assumption in fantasy that characters should be white and that the society should resemble the Middle Ages.

=== Technology ===
Technologically, Earthsea is an early Iron Age society, with bronze used in places where iron is scarce. Ged's father is a bronze-smith. Weapons also include the use of wood and other hard but easily crafted metals.

=== Languages ===
The people of the Archipelago are united by a single language: Hardic. Though dialects have inevitably sprung up on the various islands, all are mutually intelligible. The Kargs speak Kargish, and on the island of Osskil, the inhabitants also speak Osskili.

Dragons talk in True Speech, also called Old Speech, the original language of magic.

Earthsea, with the exception of the Kargad lands, is a literate society using a writing system called the "Hardic runes". The name suggests similarity to the Germanic runes, but there are supposed to be hundreds of runes in use (in A Wizard of Earthsea, Ged learns to read and write "The Six Hundred Runes of Hardic"), suggesting a logographic system similar to Chinese.

=== Names ===
Each individual among the Hardic people has several names over the course of their life: a child-name, a use-name and a true name. Up to puberty, a person is known by their child-name; at their rite of Passage, at about the age of thirteen, that name is taken from them and they are given their true name by a witch, sorcerer or wizard. The true name is a single word of True Speech. One's true name is a closely guarded secret, shared only with those whom they trust completely because it grants the knower great power over the person. A use-name is adopted for everyday dealings. It may be an animal (Dragonfly, Hare, Otter, Sparrowhawk), a plant (Alder, Heather, Moss, Rowan), a substance (Diamond, Flint, Ivory, Jasper, Onyx) or something else (Golden, Kurremkarmerruk, the latter having no meaning). Use-names are not unique; there are, for instance, three different characters called Rose.

Kargs, who hate and fear magic, do not use this system of naming. They have single names only (Azver, Seserakh, Tenar).

== History ==
The Creation of Éa is a 31-stanza poem, the oldest part of Earthsea's oral tradition. It describes how Segoy raised the islands of Earthsea from the ocean by naming them in the True Speech.

Little is known of the original inhabitants of Earthsea, but scattered legends suggest that humans and dragons were once one race. The ancient Pelnish lore and Kargad legends describe an agreement between them called the Vedurnan or Verw Nadan to separate because of their differing temperaments and goals. The dragons chose the free life of air and fire, while humans chose the material world of earth and water.

Early in the history of humans, the largest and most powerful realm was centered on the northern islands of Enlad and Éa, although this realm did not rule all of Earthsea and it is unclear whether other realms existed. The wars and romantic heroes of this period form part of mythology, similar to the Trojan War in European culture. Later, as more of Earthsea came under the dominion of the Kings of Enlad, the center of the kingdom moved from Enlad to the largest island, the more central Havnor. This dynasty of Great Kings ruled all or almost all of Earthsea, but ended soon after the death of Erreth-Akbe and the kingdom fragmented into many separate principalities and domains. By the time of Ged and the beginning of the series, this state of affairs had persisted for centuries, though the emergence of a new king had been prophesied.

== Magic ==
Magic is a central part of life in most of Earthsea, with the exception of the Kargish lands, where it is banned. There are weather workers on ships, fixers who repair boats and buildings, entertainers, and court sorcerers. Magic is an inborn talent which can be developed with training. The most gifted are sent to the school on Roke, where, if their skill and their discipline prove sufficient, they can become staff-carrying wizards.

A strong theme of the stories is the connection between power and responsibility. There is often a Taoist message: "good" wizardry tries to be in harmony with the universe, while "bad" wizardry, such as necromancy, can lead to an upsetting of the "balance" and threaten catastrophe. While the dragons are more powerful, they act instinctively to preserve the balance. Only humans pose a threat to it. In The Farthest Shore, Cob seeks immortality regardless of the consequences and opens a breach between life and death, which endangers the living.

Magic on Earthsea is primarily verbal. Everything has a true name in the Old Speech, the language of the dragons, and the language which Segoy used to create the world. One who knows the true name of an object has power over it. Each person also has a true name which is revealed only to those who are trusted implicitly. A "use-name", which has no magical property, suffices for everyday purposes. For example, the wizard whose true name is Ged is known by the use-name Sparrowhawk.

One vital aspect of magic is that it is impossible for people to lie in the old language, so that magic works by forcing the universe to conform to the words spoken by the magician. For example, to say "I am an eagle" in the old language means that the speaker becomes an eagle, so that the statement is no longer false. Only the magically gifted are able to do this.

=== The School of Magic ===
Roke Island is the magical heart of Earthsea and is protected by potent spells and a magical wind and fog that ward off evil. It contains several places of power, such as Roke Knoll and the Immanent Grove.

The school of Roke was founded by Elehal and Yahan of Roke, and Medra of Havnor, as a center of learning, a refuge for magicians fleeing feuding warlords who used them to do harm. The school gradually grew in authority and influence, until eventually its leader, the Archmage, was considered second only to the king. However, through the long centuries, the wizards of Roke remained always loyal, though no king could have stood against their magic. Even in the long interregnum when the Archipelago was without a king, the Archmage did not try to usurp authority, but sought only to maintain the balance. With the advent of the new king, Lebannen, the school's role had to change. When the last Archmage, Ged, loses his magical abilities, no one is appointed to replace him.

Teaching in the school is carried out by the nine Masters of Roke, each with a specialty:

- Master Windkey, whose skill lies in weather control
- Master Hand, who deals with illusions
- Master Herbal, versed in healing
- Master Changer, who knows the arts of transformation
- Master Summoner, skilled in calling or summoning
- Master Namer, who teaches the students the rudiments of True Speech
- Master Chanter, teacher of music and chanted spells
- Master Patterner, seeker of meaning and intent
- Master Doorkeeper, the guardian of the gates of the school.

Their leader is the Archmage, chosen by the nine Masters, often from outside the school. The position of the Master Finder was abolished by the first Archmage, Halkel, and replaced with that of Chanter. Halkel also banned women from the school.

=== Evolution of magic ===
Over the span of the novels and stories, there is an evolution of certain themes, echoes of which are repeated throughout Le Guin's entire body of work. Different uses of power, magic and balance, cooperation vs. dominance, the eternal soul of the Archipelago vs. Kargish concepts of reincarnation, and the position and importance of women in magic, are introduced and redefined. This revision of the depiction of Earthsea is illustrated in the way the role of women evolves throughout the series.

In the early novels, magic in Earthsea is strongly male-dominated. Women practising magic are relegated to the role of village witches who are considered inferior to male wizards and mages. Excluded from the school of Roke, where systematic knowledge of magic can be obtained, they know, at most, a few isolated words of the Old Speech which is the basis of magic. A saying quoted in the outset is "weak as a woman's magic, wicked as a woman's magic." The original trilogy does not challenge this view - Ged makes his first steps in the world of magic under the tutelage of his witch aunt, but it is taken for granted that she cannot give him very much and in order to realize his potential he must study with male mages, first with Ogion and later with the masters of Roke. More honored are sorcerers, who are male, though they may know little more about magic than witches. Those boys who show signs of magical talent or power are generally sent to the school of magic on Roke. There, if they learn what is needful, they are made wizards, signified by the bestowing of a staff of wood. There is no specific definition of a mage; one is simply a very strong wizard.

However, in later books Le Guin delves deeper into the history of Earthsea and reveals some early events that helped shape the dichotomy of male / female magic. Tehanu and The Other Wind, new information is introduced and old events are seen in a new light, revealing that, to begin with, women had a central role in founding the School of Roke and that, far from being an inherent characteristic of magic, their exclusion was the act of male mages, including the first Archmage. Two powerful female figures are introduced: Tehanu and Irian, both being human and dragon at the same time. Irian defeats undead Thorion, resolving inner conflict between the masters of Roke and Tehanu helps destroy the wall separating The Dry Land from the rest of the world.

== The Dry Land ==
The Dry Land is where the people of the archipelago and reaches of Earthsea go when they die. It is a realm of shadow and dust, of eternal night where the stars are fixed in the sky and nothing changes. The souls who live there have an empty, dreary existence, and even "lovers pass each other in silence". Wizards can, at great peril, cross from the land of the living to the Dry Land and back again by using their magic to step over the low stone wall that separates the two realms. At the bottom of the valley of the dead is the dry river and beyond that lie the Mountains of Pain. In The Farthest Shore, Ged loses his magical powers in the Dry Land: no longer able to cross the wall, he and his companion King Lebannen become the first to traverse the Mountains of Pain to return to life.

In The Other Wind, it is stated that the Dry Land was a failed attempt by early mages to gain immortality. The mages stole half of the land "west of west" from the dragons to create a paradise in which their souls would dwell. This earned them the enmity of the dragons, who considered it a breach of the agreement between them and humans called the Vedurnan. However, when the mages walled off the land, its beauty vanished, it fell under eternal night, the wind ceased blowing, and the immortal souls that went there existed without any meaning. The Other Wind recounts how the wall around the Dry Land is destroyed, freeing the trapped souls to rejoin the cycle of death and rebirth. Tenar, who was born in the Kargish lands, makes clear that the Kargad and all other living things, were always part of the cycle of death and rebirth. It was only the people of the archipelago and reaches who entered the Dry Land after death, on account of the actions of what the Kargs traditionally called their 'accursed sorcerers'.

Ursula Le Guin has stated that the idea of the Dry Land came from the "Greco-Roman idea of Hades' realm, from certain images in Dante Alighieri's work, and from one of Rainer Maria Rilke's Elegies."

== Creatures ==
=== Dragons and dragonlords ===
The dragons usually keep to themselves far to the West of Earthsea, but they sometimes attack inhabited islands in search of food or treasure and must be driven back by wizards. In A Wizard of Earthsea, the young wizard Ged guesses a dragon's true name and forces him to promise that neither he nor his sons will come to the Archipelago.

Dragons in Earthsea are neither good nor evil by human standards, but are always extremely dangerous. There are several references to the dire consequences of looking a dragon in the eye, and Ged avoids doing so on several occasions. Most dragons in the books are of a positive, though not benevolent, nature.

Dragons consider most men to be uninteresting, short-lived mayflies. The exceptions are the dragonlords. In The Tombs of Atuan, Tenar asks Ged what a dragonlord is: Ged explains that it is not someone with a mastery of dragons, but "one the dragons will speak with" rather than attack immediately. In the setting of the five Earthsea novels, Ged is the only living dragonlord (except for Tenar and possibly Lebannen). The most famous dragonlord was Erreth-Akbe, who is a legendary hero by Ged's time. Only the most powerful of mages are able to fight a dragon. The most famous duel is between Erreth-Akbe and the dragon Orm, in which each slew the other. Many centuries later, in the same place, dragon Orm-Embar was killed by the undead mage Cob.

Dragons speak only in the Language of the Making, from which the language of human magic is derived. Wizards cannot lie when they speak that language, but dragons can; they are able to twist what they say and mislead the unwary because it is their native tongue, while no wizard can live long enough to fully master it. Indeed, much of the True Speech remains unknown to humans. Dragons have a strange connection to the language: one wizard described it by saying they live in it as a fish lives in water. In Tehanu, Ged says that perhaps dragons do not learn it. Rather, it seems to be inherent in them and they simply 'are' the language.

Tehanu, Dragonfly and The Other Wind reveal that in ancient times humans and dragons were one people. They chose to part ways because of their very different natures. However, a few in each generation are born who are both human and dragon, among them Tehanu and Orm-Irian, and can transform themselves from one form to the other.

=== Gebbeth ===
A gebbeth is a person who has been consumed and taken over by a power. In A Wizard of Earthsea, a man possessed by a creature that Ged inadvertently summoned nearly takes the wizard unaware.

In a time prior to the setting of the novels, the Enemy of Morred turns Elfarran's brother into a gebbeth and uses it to trick her into travelling to the Jaws of Enlad.

=== Otaks ===
Otaks are small, furry and silent carnivores with an aggressive temperament that prey on mice and insects. Otaks are rare, living only on four islands of the southern Archipelago: Roke, Ensmer, Pody and Wathort. Ged kept an otak as a pet, named Hoeg. Keeping an otak for a pet was unusual, given that wild otaks rarely trust humans.

=== Harrekki ===
Harrekki are small reptiles that look like miniature dragons. They are found in the East Reach. Estarriol's sister Kest had a pet harrekki.

=== Trolls ===
Trolls are enormous creatures with rock-like hands and gravelly voices who serve as guards and servants for evil magicians. Trolls became extinct across the planet at an unspecified time before the events described in the books.

== Religion ==
The people of the Archipelago do not worship any deities. While there is a creation myth involving Segoy raising up the lands from the sea, Segoy is known as a powerful wizard and is not worshipped. At the end of Tehanu, the child Tehanu addresses Kalessin, oldest and wisest of the dragons as "Segoy", raising the possibility that Kalessin is identical with Segoy or is manifestation or incarnation of him. This point, however, is never taken up again in the series.

There are the "Old Powers of the Earth", which existed since before Segoy raised up the lands. These include "The Nameless Ones" in Atuan and the Terrenon in Osskil. It is revealed in Tales from Earthsea that once, the women of power spoke with and learned from the Old Powers, but in Ged's age, they are considered evil. In The Tombs of Atuan, Ged states that the Old Powers are not evil in and of themselves, but that it is wrong for humans to interfere with or worship them.

A number of deities are revered in the Kargad Lands. The oldest are "The Nameless Ones", who are worshipped in Atuan. There are also the Twin God Brothers, Atwah and Wuluah. However, the reverence given them has gradually been usurped by human beings. The God-Kings were the mortal rulers of the Kargad Lands. The dynasty began with "priest-kings", but over the years they promoted themselves, until finally they declared themselves to be gods. The last God-King is overthrown in a civil war by Thol of Hur-at-Hur and flees to Atuan, where he is killed by a priest-eunuch.

== List of works ==
=== Short stories ===
Seven short stories appear in two collections of Le Guin's work (and some have been reissued elsewhere). Two seminal stories were originally published in 1964 and were collected in The Wind's Twelve Quarters (Harper & Row, 1975). Five much later stories were collected in Tales from Earthsea (Harcourt, 2001), where three were original. Two later stories were collected in The Books of Earthsea (Saga Press, 2018).

- "The Word of Unbinding", Fantastic Stories of Imagination, January 1964
- "The Rule of Names", Fantastic Stories of Imagination, April 1964
- "Dragonfly", Legends: Short Novels by the Masters of Modern Fantasy, Tor Books, 1998
- "Darkrose and Diamond", The Magazine of Fantasy & Science Fiction, Oct-Nov 1999
- "The Bones of the Earth" (2001), original to Tales from Earthsea
- "The Finder" (2001), original to Tales from Earthsea
- "On the High Marsh" (2001), original to Tales from Earthsea
- "The Daughter of Odren" (2014) ebook, first printed in The Books of Earthsea (2018)
- "Firelight", "The Paris Review", Summer 2018

Tales from Earthsea also includes about thirty pages of fictional reference material titled "A Description of Earthsea" (2001) and catalogued as short fiction by ISFDB.

=== Novels ===
- A Wizard of Earthsea (Parnassus Press, 1968)
- The Tombs of Atuan (Atheneum Books, 1971) (Note: According to ISFDB, "The Tombs of Atuan (Complete Novel)" appeared in Worlds of Fantasy, Issue 3, 1970–71 (on the cover), also known as Winter 1970.)
- The Farthest Shore (Atheneum Books, 1972)
- Tehanu: The Last Book of Earthsea (Atheneum Books, 1990)
- The Other Wind (Harcourt, 2001)

=== Chronology ===
The internal or fictitious historical order of Earthsea stories differs from their publication order. There is some uncertainty in this "historical" list, but the five novels were published in historical order and the birth of Ged preceded all but the first four entries.

- "The Word of Unbinding"
- "The Finder"
- "Darkrose and Diamond"
- "The Rule of Names"
- "The Bones of the Earth"
- A Wizard of Earthsea
- The Tombs of Atuan
- "On the High Marsh"
- The Farthest Shore
- Tehanu
- "Dragonfly"
- "The Daughter of Odren"
- The Other Wind
- "Firelight"
- "A Description of Earthsea", the last part of Tales from Earthsea, is fictitious reference material rather than narrative.

The two 1964 stories are not entirely consistent with the others and they have no certain place in Earthsea chronology. "The Word of Unbinding" may be set any time before The Other Wind, but the differences in magical terminology, the presence of the otherwise unknown "trolls" (whom Le Guin notes "became extinct in Earthsea at some point") and the character of the evil wizard Voll the Fell suggest that it might be appropriately placed either before the time of Morred, or later, in the Dark Times after the death of Maharion and before the founding of the school on Roke: in either case before "The Finder".

"The Rule of Names" apparently takes place some time in (about) the century before A Wizard of Earthsea: Le Guin writes that the main character "must have been on Sattins Island some decades or centuries before Ged found him.... on the Isle of Pendor". But that could place the story before or after "Darkrose and Diamond," which is "at any time during the last couple of hundred years in Earthsea". "The Rule of Names" has some plot links to A Wizard of Earthsea, while "Darkrose and Diamond" is an entirely independent story.

"The Bones of the Earth" takes place early in Ged's lifetime, ten years before his apprenticeship to Ogion, and is closely linked to A Wizard of Earthsea.

The events in Tehanu partially overlap those in The Farthest Shore: some parts of Tehanu assume, or are illuminated by information from The Farthest Shore.

"The Daughter of Odren" is apparently set between "Dragonfly" and The Other Wind because it's told that 15 years are passed after the political turmoil period occurred before The Farthest Shore.

"Firelight" is set in the house of Ogion on Gont, at the close of Ged's life.

== Awards ==
Each novel in the series has received a literary award, including the 1969 Boston Globe-Horn Book Award for Fiction & the 1979 Lewis Carroll Shelf Award for A Wizard of Earthsea, the 1972 Newbery Honor for The Tombs of Atuan, the 1973 National Book Award for Children's Books for The Farthest Shore, the 1990 Nebula Award for Best Novel for Tehanu, and the 2002 World Fantasy Award for Best Novel for The Other Wind.

== Adaptations ==
=== Radio ===
A BBC-produced two-hour radio dramatisation of A Wizard of Earthsea was originally broadcast on Radio 4 on December 26, 1996. This adaptation was narrated by Dame Judi Dench, with Michael Maloney as Ged, and used a wide range of actors with different regional and social accents to emphasize the origins of the Earthsea characters (for instance, Estarriol and others from the East Reach were played by actors with Southern Welsh accents). The adaptation was subsequently released on audio cassette.

A subsequent BBC radio dramatisation, this time of the first three Earthsea books, was broadcast in six half-hour parts on Radio 4 Extra during April and May, 2015.

=== Television ===
The U.S.-based Sci Fi Channel broadcast a three-hour loose adaptation for television of A Wizard of Earthsea and The Tombs of Atuan in December 2004, and it was broadcast on Channel 4 in the UK in Easter 2005 in two parts. Titled Legend of Earthsea, it angered fans of the Earthsea novels (and Le Guin herself) with the announcement that Ged and the vast majority of the other characters would be played by Caucasians and with the Dramatis personæ posted on the official website (see below), which featured several original characters such as "The Archmagus", "King Tygath", "Diana", "Penelope", "Marion", and several references to "Kargide" (not Kargad, Karg, or Kargish) characters. The religious practices of Atuan were portrayed differently and the celibacy of Earthsea wizards overlooked as Ged and Tenar become sexually involved.

Le Guin was not involved in the production in any way. She did publish the following remarks on her website:

I can only admire Mr [Executive Producer Robert] Halmi's imagination, but I wish he'd left mine alone... I wonder if the people who made the film of The Lord of the Rings had ended it with Frodo putting on the Ring and ruling happily ever after, and then claimed that that was what Tolkien "intended..." Would people think they'd been "very, very honest to the books?"

=== Anime ===
Studio Ghibli's 2006 film, Gedo Senki — Tales from Earthsea, is loosely based in the Earthsea mythology. It was directed by Gorō Miyazaki, the son of Hayao Miyazaki. In the past, Le Guin had rejected Hayao Miyazaki's offer to create a film based on the series, but due to her love of his films, Le Guin granted Studio Ghibli the rights. The story is based mainly on elements of the third and fourth novels of Earthsea: however, Le Guin has stated that she found this rendition of her work "disappointing" and "entirely different" from her creation.
