= The Tombs of Atuan =

1970 fantasy novel by Ursula K. Le Guin

- First edition cover (hardcover, second state, with the Newbery Honor)
- Author: Ursula K. Le Guin
- Cover artist: Gail Garraty
- Language: English
- Series: Earthsea
- Release number: 2
- Genre: Fantasy, Bildungsroman
- Publisher: Atheneum Books
- Publication date: 1971
- Publication place: United States
- Media type: Hardcover
- Pages: 163 (first edition)
- ISBN: 9780689206801
- Preceded by: A Wizard of Earthsea
- Followed by: The Farthest Shore

The Tombs of Atuan /ˈætuːɑːn/ is a fantasy novel by the American author Ursula K. Le Guin, first published in the Winter 1970 issue of Worlds of Fantasy magazine, and published as a book by Atheneum Books in 1971. It is the second book in the Earthsea series after A Wizard of Earthsea (1969). The Tombs of Atuan was a Newbery Honor Book in 1972.

Set in the fictional world of Earthsea, The Tombs of Atuan follows the story of Tenar, a young girl born in the Kargish empire, who is taken while still a child to be the high priestess to the "Nameless Ones" at the Tombs of Atuan. Her existence at the Tombs is a lonely one, deepened by the isolation of being the highest ranking priestess. Her world is disrupted by the arrival of Ged, the protagonist of A Wizard of Earthsea, who seeks to steal the half of a talisman that is buried in the treasury of the Tombs. Tenar traps him in the labyrinth under the Tombs, but she then rebels against her teaching and keeps him alive. Through him she learns more about the outside world, and she begins to question her faith in the Nameless Ones and her place at the Tombs.

Like A Wizard of Earthsea, The Tombs of Atuan is a bildungsroman, which explores Tenar's growth and identity. Tenar's coming-of-age is closely tied to her exploration of faith and her belief in the Nameless Ones. The Tombs of Atuan explores themes of gender and power, in the setting of a cult of female priests in service to a patriarchal society, while providing an anthropological view of Kargish culture. Tenar, who became the subject of Le Guin's fourth Earthsea novel, Tehanu, has been described as a more revolutionary protagonist than Ged, or Arren, the protagonist of The Farthest Shore (1972), the third Earthsea volume. Whereas the two men grow into socially approved roles, Tenar rebels and struggles against the confines of her social role. The Tombs of Atuan shares elements of a heroic quest story with other Earthsea novels, but it subverts some tropes common to the fantasy genre at the time, for example, by choosing a female protagonist in Tenar and a dark-skinned leading character in Ged.

The Tombs of Atuan was well received when published, with critics commenting favorably on the character of Tenar, Le Guin's writing, and her "sensitive" portrayal of cultural differences between the Kargish people and those of the rest of Earthsea. The story also received praise for its exploration of religious themes and ethical questions. Le Guin's treatment of gender was criticized by several scholars, who stated that she had created a female protagonist, but within a male-dominated framework. Nonetheless, the novel has been described by scholars and commentators as "beautifully written", and a "significant exploration of womanhood".

== Background ==
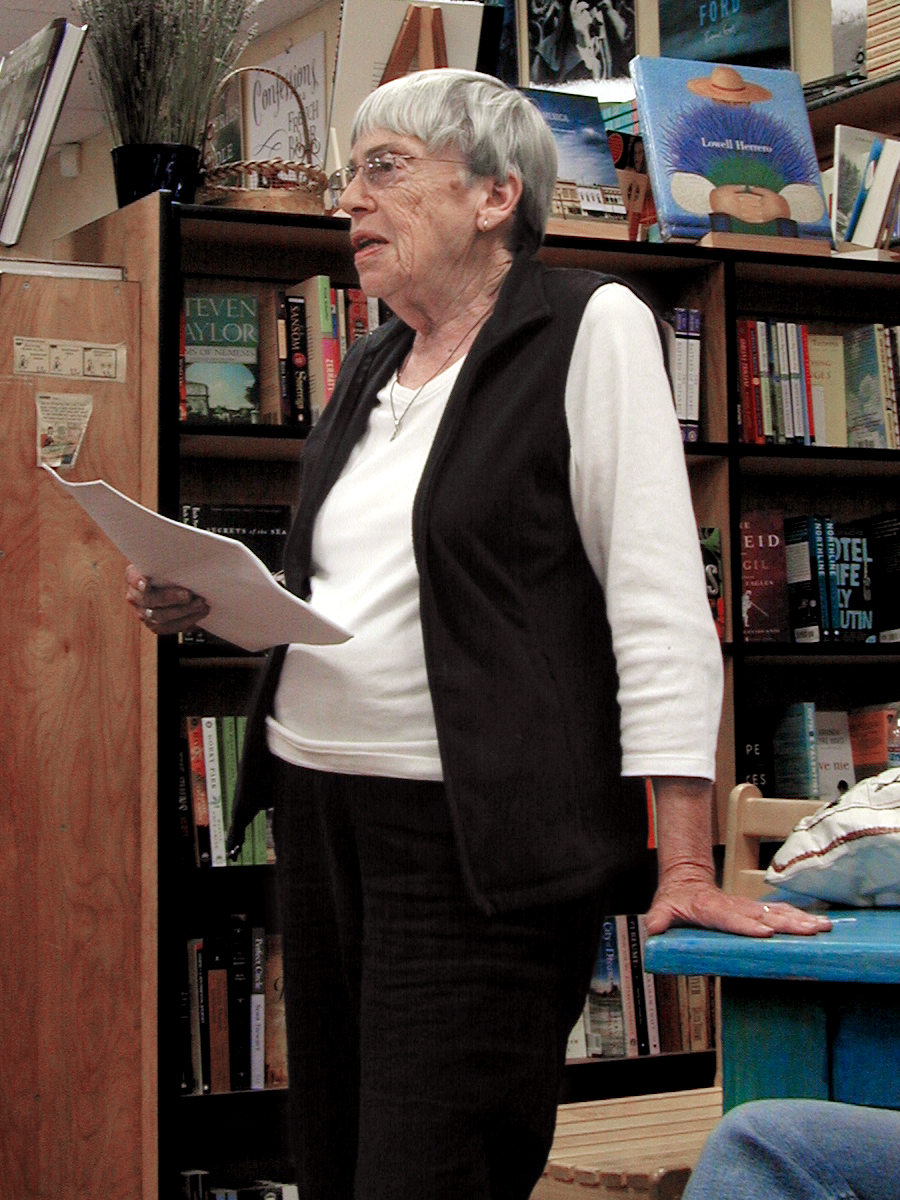
Le Guin giving a reading in 2008

Ursula K. Le Guin's universe of Earthsea first appeared in two short stories, "The Rule of Names" (1964) and "The Word of Unbinding" (1964), both published in Fantastic. These stories developed early concepts for the fictional world. They were both later anthologized in Le Guin's collection The Wind's Twelve Quarters, published in 1975. Earthsea was the setting for a story Le Guin wrote in 1965 or 1966, which was never published. In 1967, Herman Schein (the publisher of Parnassus Press and the husband of Ruth Robbins, the illustrator of A Wizard of Earthsea) asked Le Guin to try writing a book "for older kids", giving her complete freedom over the subject and the approach. Drawing from her short stories, Le Guin began work on A Wizard of Earthsea. Le Guin has said that the book was in part a response to the image of wizards as ancient and wise, and to her wondering where they come from. Le Guin later said that her choice of fantasy as a medium, and of the theme of coming of age, was a product of her writing for adolescents.

The short stories published in 1964 introduced the world of Earthsea and important concepts in it, such as Le Guin's treatment of magic. Le Guin's depiction of Earthsea was influenced by her familiarity with Native American legends as well as Norse mythology. The influence of Norse lore can be seen in the characters of the Kargs, who are blonde and blue-eyed, and worship two gods who are brothers. Influential in The Tombs of Atuan is Le Guin's familiarity with anthropology, visible in her description of Kargish culture and cultural differences with the rest of Earthsea. Le Guin's belief in Taoism is visible in the idea of a cosmic "balance" in the universe of Earthsea. Le Guin originally intended for A Wizard of Earthsea to be a standalone novel, but she wrote The Tombs of Atuan as a sequel after considering the loose ends in the first book, and wrote a third book, The Farthest Shore, a year later after further consideration. Scholars have stated that the civil rights movement, and opposition to the Vietnam War that was gaining prominence during the period The Tombs of Atuan was written, subtly affected the structure of the book. Although not a "primarily feminist" novel, Le Guin's decision to choose a female protagonist has been described as a nod to the women's rights movement, while Tenar's growing disquiet with her beliefs has been compared to the unease of individuals who began to protest discrimination and the Vietnam War.

== Setting ==
Earthsea is an archipelago, or group of islands. In the fictional history of this world, the islands were raised from the ocean by Segoy, an ancient deity or hero. The world is inhabited by both humans and dragons, and several among the humans are sorcerers or wizards. Influenced strongly by Le Guin's interest in Taoism, the world is shown as being based on a delicate balance, which most of its inhabitants are aware of, but which is disrupted by somebody in each of the original trilogy of novels. Magic in the societies of Earthsea is depicted as a force for both good and evil. The setting of Earthsea is pre-industrial, and has many cultures within the widespread archipelago. Most of the characters of the story are of the Hardic peoples, who are dark-skinned, and who populate most of the islands. The internal universe of Earthsea has not remained constant across Le Guin's various works set in it, but has been continually adjusted and revised.

Some of the North-eastern islands are populated by the white-skinned Kargish people, who see the Hardic folk as evil sorcerers: the Kargish, in turn, are viewed by the Hardic as barbarians. The Kargish peoples have a distinct culture and geography: for example, they do not use written language, as they consider it an evil practice. The Kargish people have been described by scholars as being the analog of people in the United States; similarities include an organized religion, and a class system. This society does not believe in the equilibrium that the rest of the archipelago believes in, and does not believe in magic either. The Kargad empire is a theocracy; its monarch, the God-king, claims to represent the power of the Nameless Ones, described as the "powers of the dark, of ruin, of madness". The society is depicted as militant, and patriarchal. Le Guin suggests that though the God-king relies upon the Nameless Ones and their high priestess to maintain his authority, he no longer believes in them.

== Plot summary ==
Tenar, a girl born on the Kargish island of Atuan, is believed to be the reincarnation of the high priestess of the tombs of Atuan. She is taken from her family when she turns five, and goes to the Tombs. Her name is taken from her in a ceremony, and she is referred to as "Arha", or the "Eaten One", after being consecrated to the service of the "Nameless Ones" at the age of six with a ceremony involving a symbolic sacrifice. She moves into her own tiny house, and is given a eunuch servant, Manan, with whom she develops a bond of affection.

Arha's childhood and youth are lonely; her only friends are Manan and Penthe, a priestess her own age. She is trained in her duties by Thar and Kossil, elderly priestesses of the two other major deities. Thar tells her of the Undertomb and the Labyrinth beneath the Tombs, teaching her how to find her way around them in the darkness. She tells of the treasure hidden within the Labyrinth, which wizards from the Archipelago have tried to steal. When Arha asks about the wizards, Thar tells her that they are unbelievers who can work magic.

When she turns fourteen, Arha assumes all the responsibilities of her position, becoming the highest-ranked priestess in the Tombs. As part of her duties, she is required to execute prisoners sent to the Tombs by the God-King of the Kargad lands; she has them killed by starvation, an act which haunts her. After Thar dies of old age, Arha becomes increasingly isolated: although stern, Thar had been fair to her; Kossil despises Arha and feigns belief in the Nameless Ones.

Arha's routine is disrupted by her discovery of the wizard Ged (the protagonist of A Wizard of Earthsea) in the Undertomb, the main hub of the Tombs. As Ged advances into the Labyrinth, she traps him behind a locked door and through a peephole sees him unsuccessfully attempt to open the door with a spell. Ged eventually collapses out of exhaustion, and Arha has him chained while debating his fate.

After questioning him, she learns that he has come to the Tombs to retrieve one half of the long-lost Ring of Erreth-Akbe, a magical artifact broken centuries earlier which is inscribed with nine Runes of Power; the breaking caused the Bond-Rune, necessary for peace in Earthsea, to be forgotten. Ged unknowingly received his half of the Ring during the events of A Wizard of Earthsea, and a dragon later told him what it was. Arha is enamored by Ged's tales of the outside world and delays executing him, instead sneaking him food and water.

Kossil learns of Ged's existence, forcing Arha to promise that Ged will be sacrificed to the Nameless Ones; however, she realizes that she cannot go through with it, instead instructing Manan to dig a false grave in the Undertomb; she hides Ged in the Treasury, where neither Manan nor Kossil can enter. As she departs the Treasury, Ged thanks her using her true name—Tenar.

Arha and Kossil have a public argument in which Kossil declares that the Nameless Ones no longer have power while Arha curses her in their name. Realizing that Kossil will now be determined to kill her, she heads to the labyrinth and sees Kossil exhuming Ged's false grave. Evading her, Arha goes to the Treasury and confesses everything to Ged, who has found the other half of Erreth-Akbe's ring. He tells Arha that she must either kill him or escape with him, and says that while the Nameless Ones demand her service, they neither give nor create anything in return. He tells her his true name, reciprocating her trust.

Manan intervenes by attempting to attack Ged, but falls to his death in a pit as the tombs begin to collapse in on themselves; Ged holds off their destruction until they are able to escape to the surface. Arha reverts to calling herself Tenar as she and Ged travel across Atuan to the coast where his boat is hidden, intending to travel to present the Ring at Havnor. While waiting for the tide, she feels an urge to kill Ged for destroying her life, but realizes while gazing at him that she has no anger left. Ged and Tenar sail to Havnor, where they are received in triumph.

== Major characters ==
=== Tenar ===
Tenar, from whose perspective The Tombs of Atuan is told, is born on the Kargish island of Atuan before being taken away to serve the Nameless Ones as their high priestess. She is told that she is the reincarnation of the high priestess, and has lived at the tombs since time immemorial; though she believes this early in her life, she begins to question the idea later in the novel. For much of the book she is known only as Arha, or the "Eaten one"; her identity as an individual is gradually erased. Though she is depicted as a person of strength and imagination, her development is stunted by the priestesses; her feelings are repressed, and her mind has no place to wander except the labyrinth. After trapping Ged, she talks to him about the rest of Earthsea, and begins to desire a life outside the barrenness of the Tombs. It is only after her escape that she seems to regain her name, crying "I have my name back. I am Tenar!" Tehanu, the fourth Earthsea novel, is narrated from Tenar's point of view; it depicts her life on Gont and her reunion and relationship with Ged. She reappears in The Other Wind, the sixth Earthsea book. Tenar is paired with Ged in The Tombs of Atuan, the two sharing power to create a more powerful combination. Tenar is part of multiple pairs of characters that develop together; both Ged, in The Tombs of Atuan, and later Tehanu in her eponymous novel, are shown as being dependent on her.

=== Ged ===
Ged, who in the story goes by his common name of Sparrowhawk, only enters the novel midway through when he comes to the tombs to steal the ring of Erreth-Akbe. Where he was an adolescent in A Wizard of Earthsea, he is depicted as a mature individual in the second Earthsea volume, one who gradually transforms Tenar's view of the world. In The Tombs of Atuan, he plays the role of the wise helper to the protagonist, a type of companionship common to Le Guin's novels. After Tenar chooses to talk to him rather than have him killed, he tells her about the rest of Earthsea that she is ignorant of, and so helps her see a path out of her difficulties that she could not. The scars that Ged bears from his encounter with the shadow in A Wizard of Earthsea make Tenar realize that he has confronted death in a way that she has never done. Literature scholar Elizabeth Cummins argues that while Ged does not actually save Tenar, he "functions as the midwife in her rebirth". Ged is the figure of the "other" in this novel; in contrast to the other inhabitants of the Tombs, he is male, dark-skinned, and a wizard. Ged's difference in the story is symbolized by light on many occasions, such as when his staff allows Tenar to see the undertomb for the first time: she is shocked then to find it to be beautiful, rather than just dark. Ged is responsible for giving Tenar a wider perspective and showing her a more compassionate and joyful world than her previous experience allowed her to imagine.

== Themes ==
=== Coming of age ===
As with A Wizard of Earthsea, The Tombs of Atuan is a bildungsroman or coming-of-age story, this time from the perspective of a female character, Tenar. Though she nominally has a position of high authority, Tenar feels trapped by her duties as priestess, and desires to escape to a place where she can make her own choices. In contrast to Ged, whose journey was chiefly a private quest, Tenar's choices have direct social consequences. While Ged's growth is traced through the various adventures he experiences in the first volume of the series, Tenar's development is shown through her exploration of her own domain. The labyrinth, in particular, with its twists and turns, is a metaphor for Tenar's exploration of her own thoughts. In this reading of the novel, the labyrinth symbolizes the imprisonment of the women, and the darkness and unacknowledged thoughts within Tenar, which she begins to struggle through after feeling guilt over killing the prisoners sent to her for execution.

A dark hand had let go its lifelong hold upon her heart. But she did not feel joy, as she had in the mountains...

What she had begun to learn was the weight of liberty. Freedom is a heavy load, a great and strange burden for the spirit to undertake. It is not easy. It is not a gift given, but a choice made, and the choice may be a hard one. The road goes upward towards the light; but the laden traveler may never reach the end of it.

— Ursula K. Le Guin, The Tombs of Atuan, chapter 12, Voyage.

After this incident, she falls ill and experiences nightmares, suggesting that when she underwent the rituals that made her the "eaten one", some of her personality and her regard for life remained. She questions her faith (another theme that runs through the novel), and begins to develop a sense of self apart from it, helped in this process by Ged. She wrestles with her contradictory thoughts for a long time; keeping Ged alive would be contrary to all her teachings and the powers she serves, but sacrificing him would be contrary to her developing respect for life. An important moment in this process is when Ged calls her by her true name, and clarifies for her the choice between remaining in the Tombs as Arha and embracing Tenar and stepping into the larger world of Earthsea. Afterwards, she has a nightmare about suffocating, a motif Cummins describes as being common to female coming-of-age stories.

The hold that the darkness has over her does not disappear when she escapes and the Tombs are brought down in an earthquake by the nameless ones. She contemplates killing Ged, blaming him for her pain. Eventually, she learns to accept her guilt over her actions, realizing that though she had no choice in her actions as a priestess, she now has a choice to move away from them; however, this "freedom is a heavy load". Le Guin ends the novel with the reassuring sentence "Gravely she walked beside [Ged] up the white streets of Havnor, holding his hand, like a child coming home", suggesting that she has been successful in finding new connections in her life. The conclusion of the novel represents the successful end of a quest that Ged undertook as a mature wizard, part of the story arc that traces his character development across the first three Earthsea books; thus The Tombs of Atuan has been described as part of Ged's coming-of-age as well.

=== Faith and belief ===
The notion of faith and deep belief is a large part of the novel, and is related to the book's other theme of identity. Throughout the story there is a tension between faith in the Nameless Ones and their power, and human curiosity and the tendency to question. The importance of tradition and belief in Kargish culture is emphasized when Tenar is taken from her family, and chosen to be the high priestess of the Tombs. However, Tenar's mother unsuccessfully tries to dupe the priestesses into believing the child has a skin disease. Commentators state that this episode suggests certain universal impulses can lead to resistance against "cultural imperatives"; Tenar's mother is willing to bend the rules to keep her child. Unlike the rest of Earthsea, which relies on the "Old Speech" for its magic and rituals, the Kargish lands use their own tongue, and rituals are conducted with meaningless babble; thus from the moment the chanting of the priestesses is described, Le Guin suggests that the Kargish faith is one of meaningless words and ritual. The Kargish deities are revered as the "Nameless Ones"; thus Ged's statement to Arha that all things have names also works to undermine her faith.

Tenar begins to question her beliefs when she hears Kossil defying the Nameless Ones, and sees that they do not punish her. She has a conversation with Penthe, her only friend, who expresses an "unfaith" in the divinity of the God-king. Though Tenar reacts to this with shock, the incident opens a new perspective to her. In her own thoughts, "she felt as if she had looked up and suddenly seen a whole new planet hanging huge and populous right outside the window, an entirely strange world, one in which the gods did not matter." Ged acts as a catalyst for this stream of thought, because he is completely alien to her; he is male, brown-skinned, and has a picture of the world is so different from Tenar's own. After speaking to him, she begins to wonder whether the Nameless Ones, despite their power, deserve her worship, and begins to lose faith in them and in all the things she has been taught. She expects to find only evil in Ged, according to what she has been taught; but instead she finds light and love, further challenging her belief.

=== Gender and power ===
Gender and power feature as themes through The Tombs of Atuan. The labyrinth has been described as a tomb for the lives that Kargish women could have led. Le Guin herself stated that the theme of The Tombs of Atuan was sex, a statement which reviewers have suggested meant not physical intimacy, but yearning and the recognition of potential for intimacy. The role of the women priestesses at the Tombs is analogous to that of Kargish women in their society; though the priestesses have eunuch servants and male guards ostensibly to protect them, the Tombs are a prison, and act to isolate the women from the rest of society. The priestesses have internalized this situation, and act to enforce it: Kossil's cruelty is described as epitomizing this. Brought into this environment, Tenar's development as a person is not the result of choices she made, as is the case with Ged in A Wizard of Earthsea; instead, her coming of age is forced upon her.

Despite the fact that Tenar does not become a wizard (like Ged) or a king (like Arren, the primary character of The Farthest Shore), Cummins argues that her growth is more revolutionary than either of theirs. In contrast to the male bildungsroman in which characters grow into the characteristics society believes they should have, Tenar's coming of age is a female bildungsroman, in which she must struggle against the patriarchal Kargish empire. She learns to value herself for herself and not simply for her role as a priestess. She is helped through this process by Ged, who sees her as a powerful person, and helps her find choices that she did not see. Over the course of the story she realized that her true power is not her authority as the reincarnated high priestess, but the ability to make the choice to leave the labyrinth and the Tombs. Le Guin suggests that true power is not only about authority and mastery, but trust and collaboration.

== Style and structure ==
The novels of the Earthsea cycle differ notably from Le Guin's early Hainish cycle works, written during the same period. Fantasy scholar George Slusser described them as providing a counterweight to the "excessive pessimism" of the Hainish novels. He saw the former as depicting individual action in a favorable light, in contrast to works such as "Vaster than Empires and More Slow". The trilogy shares a thematic similarity in that each volume is a bildungsroman for a different character; the first for Ged, the second for Tenar, and the third for Arren.

Though the structure of the Earthsea novels is in many ways typical of fantasy, it has been described as subverting the tropes of this genre. The protagonists of her stories, with the exception of Tenar, were all dark-skinned, in comparison to the white-skinned heroes more traditionally used. The Tombs of Atuan examines the development of a young girl in great detail, a choice unusual for a fantasy writer of the period in which the book was written.

The early part of the story provides an anthropological view of the culture of the Tombs, and through them, of the Kargish lands as a whole. The reader is shown that the true names of people have no particular significance in the Kargish lands, whereas in the Archipelago they grant power over the thing being named; nonetheless, the critical moment in which Tenar recalls her true name has been described as influencing other works such as Hayao Miyazaki's 2001 film Spirited Away. Scholars have described Le Guin's depiction of Kargish culture as a subtle critique, particularly of the powers of the Tombs, which give nothing in return for their worship. Much of the early part of the novel describes the life that Tenar leads in the stable world of the Tombs. Ged's arrival acts as a turning point, and the rest of the book explores the possibility of change, and introduces different perspectives on the internal world of the novel.

The form of narrative employed by Le Guin in the Earthsea trilogy has been described by literature scholar Mike Cadden as "free indirect discourse"; a technique in which the feelings of the protagonist are not directly separated from the narration, making the narrator seem sympathetic to the characters, and removing the skepticism towards a character's thoughts and emotions that are a feature of more direct narration. Cadden suggests that this method leads to younger readers sympathizing directly with the characters, thereby making it an effective technique for young-adult literature, whereas adults are likely to read the situations differently. In The Tombs of Atuan, much of the story is told from Tenar's perspective; for instance, the reader sees Tenar's fear of the undertomb through her own eyes, creating an empathy for her.

Scholars have compared The Tombs of Atuan to The Beginning Place, another of Le Guin's fantasy works; both stories have a female protagonist guiding a blundering male through a labyrinth of sorts. Comparisons have been made to a number of Le Guin's works which have a notion of a dream world in which the protagonists undergo a transformation; in The Tombs of Atuan, this is the labyrinth. Ged's journey through the series has been compared to the traditional heroic quest, including a "descent into the underworld" represented by the labyrinth in The Tombs of Atuan. It has drawn comparisons to the character of Alvin in Arthur C. Clarke's novella The City and the Stars.

== Publication and reception ==
A shorter version of The Tombs of Atuan was published in the magazine Worlds of Fantasy in the Winter 1970 issue. The complete version was published by Atheneum Books in 1971. It was the second book of the original Earthsea "trilogy", being preceded by A Wizard of Earthsea, and followed by The Farthest Shore in 1972. The Tombs of Atuan has since been translated into more than 20 languages, and has been reprinted many times. The first three Earthsea novels received critical acclaim as works for children when they were published. The classification of the original trilogy as children's literature was decried by many critics, such as Barbara Bucknall, who stated that the stories were "ageless because they deal with problems that confront us at any age", and could be read by both children and adults. It took several decades and the publication of a fourth novel, Tehanu for the series to be recognized as adult literature. Two more books were published in subsequent years; Tales from Earthsea and The Other Wind, both in 2001. These books, along with Tehanu, have sometimes been referred to as a second trilogy. Tehanu has been described as a rewriting or reimagining of The Tombs of Atuan, because Tenar's power and status are the inverse of what they were in the earlier book. In 2005 an original mini-series titled Legend of Earthsea, based loosely on the first two Earthsea books was broadcast on the Sci Fi Channel. Le Guin expressed strong displeasure with the result, which she said had "whitewashed Earthsea".

The Tombs of Atuan was a Newbery Honor Book in 1972, but did not win any other major awards before being a runner-up for the International Children's Literature Association's Phoenix Award twenty years after its first publication. Upon its publication British critic Naomi Lewis called it an "extraordinary book", while scholar Andrew Wolk called the series a masterpiece of fantasy. The prose in the novel received praise; a 1996 reference book on science fiction described them as among the best regarded fantasies, and went on to call the series a "fast-paced narrative" that explored serious questions of morality, power, and identity, Science fiction writer Jo Walton said that it was a "beautifully written" book. She went on to write that a "lesser writer" would have ended the novel after the earthquake and the collapse of the Tombs, but that the last section of the story, about Ged and Tenar's travel, "do a lot to ground it", making it "solid and well rooted as ever". Speculative fiction scholar Mike Cadden praised the characterization in the novel, calling Tenar the "finest and most complicated multiple character in the Earthsea series, and maybe in all of her fiction". However, scholar Sandra Lindow referred to the conclusion of the novel, and particularly the conclusion of Ged and Tenar's relationship, as unsatisfying. A 2016 review in The Huffington Post praised the religious theme in the novel, saying Le Guin "skillfully illustrates the way religious conviction can permeate and give meaning to a life", while Entertainment Weekly referred to it as "a classic of stealth-missile literature, a fantasy adventure that's actually a feminist horror thriller".

Le Guin's portrayal of the cultural differences between the Kargish lands and the rest of Earthsea has been praised as "sensitive", while her use of the theme of gender has been referred to as a "significant exploration of womanhood". Nonetheless, Le Guin's treatment of gender in The Tombs of Atuan, and in the first three Earthsea volumes in general, has been questioned by critics, who suggest that it perpetuates a male-dominated model of the world of Earthsea. The unhealthy cult depicted at the Tombs serves only to reinforce the moral superiority of the school of Roke depicted in A Wizard of Earthsea; the school is run entirely by men. Some feminist scholars have criticized The Tombs of Atuan for depicting the "suppression" of a female cult. Other scholars dispute this description, arguing that the "cult" in question is in fact shown as evil, and is moreover not acting of its free will; it is already subordinate to the will of a male king. Speaking decades after the publication of The Tombs of Atuan, Le Guin stated that she considered The Eye of the Heron (published in 1978, seven years after The Tombs of Atuan) to be her first novel not centered on a man; critics have interpreted this to mean that Le Guin considered The Tombs of Atuan to be a male-centered book. However in the afterword to the 2018 illustrated edition Le Guin writes "It was the first book I wrote with a woman as the true central character."

== Sources ==
- Bernardo, Susan M.; Murphy, Graham J. (2006). Ursula K. Le Guin: A Critical Companion (1st ed.). Westport, Connecticut: Greenwood Press. ISBN 0-313-33225-8.
- Cadden, Mike (2005). Ursula K. Le Guin Beyond Genre: Fiction for Children and Adults (1st ed.). New York, New York: Routledge. ISBN 0-415-99527-2.
- Cummins, Elizabeth (1990). Understanding Ursula K. Le Guin. Columbia, South Carolina, US: University of South Carolina Press. ISBN 978-0-87249-687-3.
- Le Guin, Ursula K.; Wood, Susan (1980). The Language of the Night: Essays on Fantasy and Science Fiction. Ultramarine Publishing. ISBN 9780399504822.
- Lindow, Sandra J. (2012). Dancing the Tao: Le Guin and Moral Development. Cambridge Scholars Publishing. ISBN 978-1-4438-3988-4.
- Rochelle, Warren G. (2001). Communities of the Heart. Liverpool University Press.
- Slusser, George Edgar (1976). The Farthest Shores of Ursula K. Le Guin. Wildside Press. ISBN 978-0-89370-205-2.
- Spivack, Charlotte (1984). Ursula K. Le Guin (1st ed.). Boston, Massachusetts: Twayne Publishers. ISBN 0-8057-7393-2.
