= Ged (Earthsea) =

Earthsea character

Ged /ˈɡɛd/ is the true name of a fictional character in Ursula K. Le Guin's Earthsea realm. (Note: Ged is a Scottish and northern English word for any fish in the pike family.) He is introduced in A Wizard of Earthsea, and plays both main and supporting roles in the subsequent Earthsea novels. In most of the Earthsea books he goes by the Hardic name Sparrowhawk; as a child he is known as Duny.

== Character overview ==
Ged is the main protagonist in A Wizard of Earthsea in which he is a serious and arrogant boy who matures into "one of the wisest and most powerful magicians in the land." He has red-brown skin.

== Biography ==
At birth, Ged was given the child-name Duny by his mother. He was born on the island of Gont, the son of a bronzesmith. His mother died before he reached the age of one. A small boy, Ged had overheard the village witch, his maternal aunt, using various words of power to call goats. Ged later used the words without understanding their meanings, to surprising effect. The witch knew that using words of power effectively without understanding them required innate power, so she endeavored to teach him what little she knew. After learning more from her, he could call animals to him. Particularly, he was seen in the company of wild sparrowhawks so often that his "use name" became Sparrowhawk (in Earthsea, most people customarily conceal their true name from all but their closest confidants). By age twelve, Ged had learned all the village witch could teach him.

When Ged was twelve, the island was attacked by raiders from the nearby Kargad lands. This attack changed Ged's life forever. When the Kargs attacked, Ged, seeing the doom of his village, used two spells to protect his people from the Kargs. The first spell enveloped the town in a fog that hid the villagers from the Kargs. The second created illusions in the mist. Ged's need to cover a large area in moisture for a long time overspent his strength, leaving him semi-conscious.

The witch could not heal Ged, but the island's great wizard, Ogion, had heard the tale of Ged's deed and sought him out. Ogion healed Ged and later returned to perform a naming ceremony on his 13th birthday for his passage out of childhood, where Ogion gave him the "true name" of "Ged." After the naming ceremony, Ogion took Ged as a pupil in the wizardly arts.

Sensing the latent power within Ged but understanding Ged's youthful impatience to be trained faster than Ogion was willing, Ogion gave Ged a choice to stay or to attend the wizard school on the island of Roke. On Roke, Ged was an outstanding student. Still, his arrogance and a dispute with a classmate caused him to try a very dangerous spell: he attempted to call the spirit of the long-dead queen Elfarran from the "Dry Land" - the bleak, joyless afterlife of Earthsea. Ged succeeded in calling Elfarran, but an evil shadow spirit slipped through the "door" Ged had opened between the living world and the dead. The Archmage (head mage of Roke) was able to partially correct this by closing the door. The Archmage, however, died in the process and could not destroy the shadow spirit which had escaped. This willpower hunted Ged, attempting to possess his body and turn him into a "Gebbeth", a soulless creature serving the forces of darkness. During Ged's travels and attempts to flee, he drives off a dragon on the isle of Pendor by calling its true name and also encounters a remote island where he is given half of a ring. After many adventures, Ged could name the shadow and thus understand it was a dark part of himself— his materialized evil. By successfully naming the shadow, Ged demonstrates he has a complete sense of his magical powers and identity as a person; these understandings fully signify Ged's entrance into manhood.

When Ged was in his thirties, he traveled to Atuan, one of the Kargad isles, to recover one-half of the broken Ring of Erreth Abke (having been given the first half during his flight from the shadow). He met Arha, the teenage high priestess of the Nameless Ones - ancient, formless evil spirits worshipped in Kargad and other gods. Ged was imprisoned by Arha in the Tombs of Atuan, where the Nameless Ones were strong, but eventually, he convinced her to leave with him and escape religious servitude. The pair saved each other's lives in the tombs, and Ged gave Arha her actual name: Tenar. Ged brought her to the isle of Havnor, and the two presented the ring to the ruler there, restoring a powerful force for peace and unity in Earthsea. Ged then took Tenar to Gont and placed her in Ogion's care before continuing his life as a traveling mage.

Ged was later appointed Archmage and served in that role for over 20 years.

In his middle age, Archmage Ged embarked on a quest to halt the decline of magical power from Earthsea, leading people to widespread outbreaks of madness. Ged embarked on this journey with a prince from Havnor named Arren, who would eventually become King Lebannen, the first king of Earthsea for many centuries, after fulfilling an ancient prophecy. The pair sailed the isles, having many adventures e.g. with hazia root addicts, people who had lost their mind and dragons, but eventually discovered that the wizard Cob, an old enemy of Ged, had mastered the Grey Mage's ancient lore and become a great mage, in his own right, and a dragon slayer. Cob's obsessive desire to secure immortality had led him to enter the Dry Land and open the door to the land of the living. This allowed Cob to enslave and summon the spirits of the dead and draw people to him in dreams but had also led to the decline of magic and a general pervasive madness in the populace.

Arren and Ged then used magic to travel into the Dry Land, where Ged forced Cob to confront the truth of his finite existence and limited power: that the Archmage had to sacrifice and use all his power to ensure the survival of magic within the world. Ged closed the door opened by Cob and then collapsed, ready to die. Arren dragged Ged's body over the black Mountains of Pain back to the land of the living. An ancient dragon, Kalessin, flew Arren to safety in Roke and Ged to Gont.

Kalessin brought Ged to Tenar, now a widow with grown children who had left home, aside from the mutilated child Therru whom she had recently adopted. Nursed back to health, Ged was informed that Ogion had recently died. Losing both his mentor and his magic caused Ged to undergo an identity crisis. He spent time in solitude as a goatherd, refusing Lebannen's invitation to attend the latter's coronation as King of Earthsea. Ged eventually returned in time to save Tenar and Therru from Therru's abusive, criminal family. Tenar and Ged began a romantic relationship. Ged had never experienced this before, as the mages of Roke were celibate.

Tenar, Ged, and Therru received a message to visit the village where Ogion's house was. This was a trap laid by Aspen, a sorcerer, and pupil of Cob, who had previously harassed Tenar. He placed the couple under a spell, imprisoned and abused them for some time, and finally attempted to kill them. Therru, who had avoided being captured, called Kalessin. The dragon arrived in time to save the couple and kill Aspen. It was revealed that Therru was kin to dragons; her actual name was Tehanu. Kalessin offers to take Tehanu away, but Ged, Tenar, and Tehanu resolve to live a simple life at Ogion's former house.

Years later, Ged, now approaching old age, counseled Alder. Alder was a sorcerer troubled by dreams where the dead, including his wife, begged him to free them from eternal, dreary existence in the Dry Land. Ged told the man to seek out Tenar and Tehanu, who were on Havnor at the time advising King Lebannen. Alder does so. After concluding many momentous events, Tenar returns to live with Ged on Gont.

== Portrayal in adaptations ==
The 2004 Sci Fi Channel miniseries Legend of Earthsea, loosely based on the first two books of the series, cast white actor Shawn Ashmore to play the part of Ged. This iteration of the character's race was criticized by Le Guin as a whitewashing of Earthsea. Among other changes, the miniseries also reversed the character's names, making "Ged" his common use-name and "Sparrowhawk" his true name. In the 2006 animated adaptation by Gorō Miyazaki, Ged is portrayed as having slightly darker skin.

== Analysis ==
Ged's magic has been described as similar to Taoist concept of magic, or philosophy. Likewise, the development of his character has been studied in this context. A major theme of the entire Earthsea series is Ged's rite of passage and transformation from a child to an adult.

== Bibliography ==
- Le Guin, Ursula K. (1968). A Wizard of Earthsea (1st ed.). Berkeley: Parnassus.
- Le Guin, Ursula K. (1971). The Tombs of Atuan (1st ed.). New York: Atheneum.
- Le Guin, Ursula K. (1972). The Farthest Shore (1st ed.). New York: Atheneum.
- Le Guin, Ursula K. (1990). Tehanu: The Last Book of Earthsea (1st ed.). New York: Atheneum.
- Manguel, Alberto (2000). The Dictionary of Imaginary Places. New York: Harcourt Brace & Company. ISBN 0-15-100541-9.
- Martin, Philip (2009). A Guide to Fantasy Literature: Thoughts on Stories of Wonder & Enchantment (1st ed.). Milwaukee, WI: Crickhollow Books. ISBN 978-1-933987-04-0.
- Mathews, Richard (2002). Fantasy: The Liberation of Imagination (1st ed.). New York: Routledge. ISBN 0-415-93890-2.
- McGovern, Una (2004). Chambers Dictionary of Literary Characters (2nd ed.). Edinburgh: Chambers Harrap Publishers. ISBN 0-550-10127-6.
