= The Farthest Shore =

1972 fantasy novel by Ursula K. Le Guin

- Cover of the first edition
- Author: Ursula K. Le Guin
- Cover artist: Gail Garraty
- Language: English
- Series: Earthsea
- Release number: 3
- Genre: Fantasy, Bildungsroman
- Publisher: Atheneum Books
- Publication date: 1972
- Publication place: United States
- Media type: Print (hardcover & paperback)
- Pages: 223 pp (first edition)
- ISBN: 0-689-30054-9
- OCLC: 481359
- LC Class: PZ7.L5215 Far
- Preceded by: The Tombs of Atuan
- Followed by: Tehanu

The Farthest Shore is a fantasy novel by the American author Ursula K. Le Guin, first published by Atheneum in 1972. It is the third novel in the series commonly called the Earthsea Cycle. Since the next Earthsea novel, Tehanu, would not be released until 1990, The Farthest Shore is sometimes called the final book in the "Earthsea trilogy", beginning with A Wizard of Earthsea and The Tombs of Atuan. The Farthest Shore follows the wizard Ged in an adventure.

The Farthest Shore won the 1973 National Book Award in the category of Children's Books. Studio Ghibli's animated film Tales from Earthsea was based primarily on this novel.

== Plot ==
An ominous, inexplicable malaise is spreading throughout Earthsea. Magic is losing its power; songs are being forgotten; people and animals are sickening or going mad. Accompanied by Arren, the young Prince of Enlad, the Archmage Ged leaves Roke Island to find the cause. On his boat Lookfar, they sail south to Hort Town, where they encounter a drug-addled wizard called Hare. They realize that Hare and many others are under the dream-spell of a powerful wizard who promises them life after death at the cost of their magic, their identity, and all names, that is, all reality. Ged and Arren continue southwest to the island of Lorbanery, once famous for its dyed silk, but the magic of dyeing has been lost, and the local people are listless and hostile.

Fleeing the stifling despair, Ged and Arren keep on southwest to the furthest islands of the Reaches. Arren is drawn under the influence of the dark wizard, and when Ged is injured by hostile islanders, Arren cannot rouse himself to help. As Ged's life ebbs, and they drift into the open ocean, they are saved by the Raft People, nomads who live on great rafts beyond any land. The spreading evil has not yet reached them, and they nurse Ged and Arren back to health. At the midsummer festival, the sickness arrives, and the singers are struck dumb, unable to remember the songs.

The dragon Orm Embar arrives on the wind and begs Ged to sail to Selidor, the westernmost of all islands, where the dark wizard is destroying the dragons, beings who embody magic. Ged and Arren voyage past the Dragons' Run south of Selidor, encountering dragons flying about and devouring each other in a state of madness. On Selidor, Orm Embar is waiting for them, but he, too, has lost the power of speech. After a search, they find the wizard in a house of dragon bones at the western tip of Selidor – the end of the world.

Ged recognises the wizard as Cob, a dark mage whom he defeated many years before. After his defeat, Cob became an expert in the dark arts of necromancy, desperate to escape death and live forever. In doing so, he has opened a breach between worlds that is sucking away all life. As Cob paralyzes Ged with the staff of a long-dead mage, Orm Embar impales himself on it, crushing Cob in a final effort. But the undead Cob cannot be killed, and he crawls back to the Dry Land of the dead, pursued by Ged and Arren. In the Dry Land, Ged manages to defeat Cob and closes the breach in the world, but it requires the sacrifice of all his magic power.

They travel even further, crawling over the Mountains of Pain back to the living world, where the oldest dragon Kalessin is waiting. He flies them to Roke, leaving Ged at his childhood home of Gont Island. Arren has fulfilled the centuries-old prediction of the last King of Earthsea: "He shall inherit my throne who has crossed the dark land living and come to the far shores of the day." Arren will reunite the fractious islands as the future King Lebannen (his true name).

Le Guin originally offered two endings to the story. In one, after Lebannen's coronation, Ged sails alone out into the ocean and is never heard from again. In the other, Ged returns to the forest of his home island of Gont. In 1990, seventeen years after the publication of The Farthest Shore, Le Guin opted for the second ending when she continued the story in Tehanu.

== Publication ==
The Farthest Shore was first published in hardback by Atheneum in 1972, with cover art by Gail Garraty. A paperback edition was published by Puffin Books in 1974, with cover art by David Smee. It has been reprinted many times since then.

== Major characters ==
- Cob: a sorcerer whom Ged has met before
- Ged: Archmage of Roke. Called Sparrowhawk
- Kalessin: the oldest of the dragons
- Lebannen: a young prince of Enlad. The name means "rowan tree" in the Old Speech. Called Arren
- Orm Embar: a powerful dragon of the West Reach descended from Orm

== Themes ==
=== Power and responsibility ===
Like both previous books in the trilogy, The Farthest Shore is a bildungsroman. The story is told mostly from the point of view of Arren, who develops from the boy who stands overawed in front of the masters of Roke, to the man who addresses dragons with confidence on Selidor, and who will eventually become the first King in centuries and unify the world of Earthsea.

Ged has also matured since earlier entries in the series. Necessity and duty guide his actions now. Ged will no longer wield magic for the thrill of power or fame or self-righteousness, and tells Arren at one point: "do nothing because it seems good to do so; do only that which you must do and which you cannot do in any other way."

=== Confronting one's shadow ===
In a sense, Cob is Ged's alter ego – a Ged who did not turn back from the dangerous road of summoning the dead, which tempted Ged in his youth, but continued to its ultimate conclusion. Thus, Ged's final confrontation with Cob and the closing of the hole between the worlds reprises his confrontation with the Shadow in the first book, who was Ged's alter ego in a more explicit way. Ged's closing of that evil hole, at the cost of completely losing his power (and very nearly his life), can also be considered as fulfilling his wish "to undo the evil" of his own necromantic spell, which as a youth he had expressed to then-Archmage Gensher (and which, as the Archmage told him, he was at the time not capable of achieving).

=== Balance ===
With a greater understanding of the Balance and Equilibrium that encompasses Earthsea (fundamental parts of Taoism, a philosophy Le Guin encourages in her works), and how life comes from death as much as death comes from life (death itself being a balancing force in the book), Ged is portrayed as a wiser archmage.

== Reception ==
Reviewing the novel for a genre audience, Lester del Rey reported that it was "fantasy with a logic of execution that is usually found only in science fiction ... rich in ideas, color and inventions".

== Bibliography ==
- Bernardo, Susan M.; Murphy, Graham J. (2006). Ursula K. Le Guin: A Critical Companion (1st ed.). Westport, Connecticut: Greenwood Press. ISBN 0-313-33225-8.
- Cadden, Mike (2005). Ursula K. Le Guin Beyond Genre: Fiction for Children and Adults (1st ed.). New York, New York: Routledge. ISBN 0-415-99527-2.
- Drout, Michael (2006). Of Sorcerers and Men: Tolkien and the Roots of Modern Fantasy Literature (1st ed.). China: Barnes & Noble. ISBN 978-0-7607-8523-2.
- Martin, Philip (2009). A Guide to Fantasy Literature: Thoughts on Stories of Wonder & Enchantment (1st ed.). Milwaukee, Wisconsin: Crickhollow Books. ISBN 978-1-933987-04-0.
- Mathews, Richard (2002). Fantasy: The Liberation of Imagination (1st ed.). New York: Routledge. ISBN 0-415-93890-2.
