= Tales from Earthsea =

Fantasy fiction collection by Ursula K. Le Guin

- Iridescent cover of the first edition
- Author: Ursula K. Le Guin
- Cover artist: Kelly Nelson (design); Marion Wood Kolisch (photo)
- Language: English
- Series: Earthsea
- Genre: Fantasy
- Published: 2001 (Harcourt Brace & Company)
- Publication place: United States
- Media type: Print (hardcover)
- Pages: 296
- ISBN: 0-15-100561-3
- OCLC: 45813870
- Dewey Decimal: [Fic] 21
- LC Class: PZ7.L5215 Tal 2001
- Preceded by: Tehanu
- Followed by: The Other Wind

Tales from Earthsea is a collection of fantasy stories and essays by American author Ursula K. Le Guin, published by Harcourt in 2001. The collection serves as a companion to the five novels of the Earthsea cycle (1968 to 2001), all set in the fictional archipelago Earthsea.

Tales from Earthsea won the annual Endeavour Award for the best book by a writer from the Pacific Northwest, in addition to the Locus Award for Best Collection of speculative fiction. Two of the five collected stories were published previously—"Darkrose and Diamond" (1999) and "Dragonfly" (1998)—and both had been nominated for annual awards.

== Synopsis ==
All the stories reinterpret the world of Earthsea. In the initial trilogy, Earthsea society and the practice of magic are dominated by men. Women can at most be witches, which is the despised lowest rank of the magical world, as expressed in the Earthsea proverb "Weak as women's magic, wicked as women's magic".

The stories in Tales from Earthsea attempt to redress the balance. It is disclosed that the Roke school had been established by women who were later excluded from it; and that Ogion, Ged's beloved tutor and mentor, had learnt his magic from a master who had in turn learnt from an "unauthorised" woman mage. Other stories feature strong and assertive women who in various ways challenge male dominance.

1. "The Finder" (a novella). The school of mages is established on Roke island.
2. "Darkrose and Diamond" (1999). The daughter of a witch and the son of a rich merchant of Havnor love each other. The tale is headed by "A Boat Song from West Havnor", and ended with the melody for the song.
3. "The Bones of the Earth". Ogion the Silent helps his wizard master deal with an earthquake that threatens Gont.
4. "On the High Marsh". A mysterious healer arrives in a remote village on the little-visited island of Semel, which is threatened by a livestock epidemic.
5. "Dragonfly" (1998). A woman on the troubled estate of Iria on the island of Way realises she has some sort of power, more than a witch's. This is a postscript to the novel Tehanu.

The book contains in addition a foreword, and at the end "A Description of Earthsea", a reference narrative covering Earthsea's peoples, languages, history, and magic.

== Publication ==
Tales from Earthsea was published by Harcourt Brace & Company in hardback in 2001, and in paperback by Orion that same year. Two of the five stories were reprinted to appear in the collection, having been published earlier: "Darkrose and Diamond" first appeared in The Magazine of Fantasy and Science Fiction in October 1999, while "Dragonfly" first appeared in Legends in October 1998.

== Analysis ==
=== Of "The Finder" ===
The scholar of literature Darko Suvin writes of "The Finder" (the longest story in the book, at over 100 pages) that it could equally have been named "An Ambiguous Utopia enters Earthsea". In his view, the ideas first presented in Tehanu are presented as "a radical modification" of the magery of the original trilogy. That involves a transformation of the society of Earthsea. The wizard protagonist known variously as Otter, Tern, or Medra can feel the necessary change. He and a female slave, Anieb, work secretly together to trap and destroy the evil wizard Gelluk, who has been forcing the slaves to mine quicksilver for him to use in magic to gain still more power. Otter finds the basis for a rebellion in "the Hand", a secret society, but it lives only by hiding from the existing warlords' power. Suvin sees the Hand's sign, a closed fist opening with the palm upwards, as a more utopian, secret, and feminine form of the "communist clenched and raised fist". On the island of Roke, female wizards have power and safety but use it to keep themselves apart from the world, "a self-made prison". Suvin finds the "intelligent feminism" congenial, and understands the motif of "women as the main force of resistance", not least as it allows "men of goodwill" to participate. He finds "persuasive" the idea that most men of Earthsea will oppose the movement, having "internalised arrogance and conflictuality". Similarly, he agrees with the idea that the school on Roke will degenerate from its state with women primae inter pares ("first among equals") into serious male elitism. But he writes that he does not agree that women can be equated with nature and liberation, mentioning Margaret Thatcher as a counter-example.

The author and translator Jo Walton, in Reactor magazine, says that she likes the start, with Otter/Medra as a finder, and the tale of his enslavement and escape, but found the account of his doings at Roke "forced" and unbelievable.

=== Of "Darkrose and Diamond" ===
Suvin describes this as one of Le Guin's "beautiful stories of heterosexual love", comparable with that of Tenar and Ged (in Tehanu), that of Otter and Ember (in "The Finder"), and that of Alder and Lily (in "The Other Wind"). He comments that these demonstrate that Le Guin did not simply believe that women were good and males bad.

Walton writes that this love story, founded on the premise that wizards are celibate, is "not bad" but not necessarily Earthsea.

=== Of "The Bones of the Earth" ===
Philip Martin comments on "The Bones of the Earth" that Le Guin's picture of the mage Dulse's standing on Gont and visualizing that island's deep roots and its connectedness to all the other islands of Earthsea provides a "striking image" for the entire series, "a set of richly imagined stories with deep connections".

=== Of "On the High Marsh" ===
Walton writes that "On the High Marsh" is the best story, depicting a "broken mage" coming to a quiet village; he is visited by Ged, the archmage.

Stephanie Burt, in Strange Horizons, writes that a story of withdrawing from use of power always means more in Le Guin's case than simple depression or penance for arrogance. Alluding to the verse at the start of A Wizard of Earthsea, Burt likens the effect to "the 'empty sky' in which the hawk takes flight".

=== Of "Dragonfly" ===
Suvin writes that for Le Guin, magic is tightly connected to power. In "Dragonfly", he comments, a "wise witch" tells the "naive young Dragonfly" that power is about control over other people. Further, the wizard Ivory tells Dragonfly that some wizards of Roke use their power corruptly, denying that women can be wizards even though they founded Roke, and demanding that wizards abstain from sex. When Dragonfly arrives in Roke, the wizards hold on to the old order, seeing strength in stiff resistance rather than going with "the wind" brought by Dragonfly, who is a dragon, Irian, temporarily in human form.

Walton says she does not like this story, finding the protagonist far too passive, and unconvincing as a dragon. She states that the only element she finds convincing is "the Master Namer being distracted by etymology".

== Awards ==
- 2002, Endeavour Award for best book by a writer from the Pacific Northwest
- 2002, Locus Award, Best Collection of speculative fiction
- 2002, Locus Readers Award for "The Bones of the Earth"
- 2003, British Fantasy Award

== Sources ==
- Bernardo, Susan M.; Murphy, Graham J. (2006). Ursula K. Le Guin: A Critical Companion (1st ed.). Westport, Connecticut: Greenwood Press. ISBN 0-313-33225-8.
- Burt, Stephanie (November 6, 2023). "Ursula Le Guin's Earthsea by John Plotz". Strange Horizons.
- Cadden, Mike (2005). Ursula K. Le Guin Beyond Genre: Fiction for Children and Adults (1st ed.). New York, NY: Routledge. ISBN 0-415-99527-2.
- Martin, Philip (2009). A Guide to Fantasy Literature: Thoughts on Stories of Wonder & Enchantment (1st ed.). Milwaukee, Wisconsin: Crickhollow Books. ISBN 978-1-933987-04-0.
- Suvin, Darko (2006). "On U. K. Le Guin's "Second Earthsea Trilogy" and Its Cognitions: A Commentary" (PDF). Extrapolation. 47 (3). doi:10.3828/extr.2006.47.3.1.
- Walton, Jo (February 2, 2010). "'What everyone knows is true turns out to be what some people used to think': Ursula Le Guin's Tales from Earthsea". Reactor.
