= Tehanu =

1990 fantasy novel by Ursula K. Le Guin

- Cover of first edition, with the subtitle The Last Book of Earthsea (absent from later editions)
- Author: Ursula K. Le Guin
- Language: English
- Series: Earthsea
- Release number: 4
- Genre: Fantasy
- Published: 1990 (Atheneum), 2012 (Saga)
- Publication place: United States
- Media type: Print (hardcover and paperback)
- Pages: 226
- Award: Nebula Award for Best Novel (1990), Locus Award for Best Fantasy Novel (1991)
- ISBN: 0-689-31595-3
- OCLC: 19975630
- Dewey Decimal: [Fic] 20
- LC Class: PZ7.L5215 Te 1990
- Preceded by: The Farthest Shore
- Followed by: Tales from Earthsea

Tehanu /təˈhɑːnuː/, initially subtitled The Last Book of Earthsea, is a fantasy novel by Ursula K. Le Guin, published in February 1990 by Atheneum. It is the fourth of her Earthsea novels, written nearly twenty years after the first three novels. It was followed by further Earthsea stories, even though its subtitle initially proclaimed it as the last. (Note: Two short stories set in Earthsea preceded the trilogy. A fifth novel and a collection of stories and essays were published about ten years after Tehanu. See Earthsea Cycle series listing at the Internet Speculative Fiction Database.)

The novel is viewed as an enlargement of the earlier Earthsea trilogy (marketed for young adults), as Tehanu presents an aging hero and heroine—Ged, a principal character in all three earlier Earthsea novels, and Tenar, the protagonist of the second in the series, The Tombs of Atuan. Tehanu won the 1990 Nebula Award for Best Novel and the 1991 Locus Award for Best Fantasy Novel.

Tehanu has been called Le Guin's best novel, featuring greater depth of characterisation than did her earlier books. Critics have commented that the novel responds to the first three Earthsea books, moving from male-oriented high fantasy to a feminist exploration of what Simone de Beauvoir called "immanence", a woman's situation in the world.

== Background ==
Tehanu is the fourth book in the Earthsea cycle, which began with Le Guin's 1968 novel A Wizard of Earthsea and its protagonist, Sparrowhawk, whose true name is Ged. The author provided some description in a recorded afterword to the 2016 audiobook version: as Tehanu opens, approximately 25 years have passed since the events at the end of The Tombs of Atuan, "time enough for the girl Tenar to become a widow with grown children"; and "a day or two" has passed since the close of The Farthest Shore to Tehanu's Chapter 4, "Kalessin", "time enough for [that] dragon... to carry Ged from Roke to Gont." (Note: Le Guin says: "Between the last chapter of The Tombs of Atuan and the first chapter of Tehanu, twenty-five years or so pass, time enough for the girl Tenar to become a widow with grown children. Between the last chapter of The Farthest Shore and the fourth chapter of Tehanu, a day or two passes, time enough for the dragon Kalessin to carry Ged from Roke to Gont.")

== Book ==
=== Plot ===
Goha lives alone on Gont because her farmer husband Flint has died, and her two children, Apple and Spark, have grown up. A burned child is brought to her at Oak Farm, and she saves her life. The burns leave scarring on the child's face, and the fingers of one hand have been fused into a claw. Goha adopts her and gives the child the name Therru, which means flame.

Goha learns that the mage Ogion requests her presence at his deathbed in Re Albi. She sets out to visit him with Therru. On the way, she encounters a group of ruffians, one of whom is Handy, who claims to be Therru's uncle. Ogion reveals Goha as Tenar, and he says she must teach Therru. After his death, Tenar stays on at his cottage, assisted by Moss, a local witch, and Heather, a simple village girl. Ged (also called Sparrowhawk) arrives on the back of the dragon Kalessin, unconscious and near death, having spent all his wizardly powers in sealing the gap between the worlds of the living and the dead created by the evil sorcerer Cob. Tenar nurses Ged back to health, but when the new king Lebannen sends envoys to bring him back to Havnor for the coronation, Ged cannot face them. He accepts Tenar's offer to return to Oak Farm to manage things there in her absence and once more takes up life as a goatherd. While at Re Albi, Tenar is confronted by the local lord's wicked mage, Aspen, who attempts to put a curse on her, but is thwarted.

Tenar informs the king's men that she cannot reveal Ged's whereabouts, and they accept the situation and depart. Tenar is threatened by both Aspen and Handy, and she flees with Therru. Confused by Aspen's magic, Tenar is almost overtaken by Handy, but escapes to Gont Port, taking refuge in the king's ship. Lebannen takes Tenar and Therru to Valmouth, where Tenar eventually returns to Oak Farm to find that Ged is away tending goats in the mountains for the season. Tenar settles back into life on the farm, until one night when Handy and a few other men attempt to break into the house. They are driven off by Tenar and Ged, and the latter nearly kills one of them with a pitchfork. Tenar and Ged begin a relationship, acknowledging that they had always loved each other. Ged wants to settle down and live an ordinary life. Together, they teach and care for Therru and manage the farm. Tenar's son Spark returns home from the sea, demanding and getting the farm, as under Gontish law, it belongs to him.

Tenar receives word that Moss is dying and wants to see her. She, Ged and Therru leave for Re Albi. However, the message was a trap set by Aspen, who reveals himself to be a follower of the evil Cob. Tenar and Ged are led to the lord's mansion controlled by Aspen's magic. Therru runs to the cliff behind Ogion's cottage, where she calls to the dragon Kalessin for help, and reveals her true nature: she is "a double being, half human, half-dragon". Aspen and his followers bring both Tenar and Ged up to the clifftop. Under the influence of Aspen's spell, they are both moving to jump to their deaths when Kalessin arrives, burning Aspen and his men to ash. Kalessin addresses Therru by her true name Tehanu, calling her daughter, and asks if she would like to leave. Tehanu decides to stay with Tenar and Ged; they settle down to a simple life at Ogion's old cottage.

=== Major characters ===
Cover of 2012 edition (hardcover) with corrected title.

The primary characters of the novel are:

- Goha, as known by her husband and locals, revealed to be Tenar, former priestess of the Tombs of Atuan, and the White Lady of Gont
- Ged, also called Sparrowhawk, the Archmage of Roke
- Aspen, revealed as Erisen, a twisted mage and follower of Cob
- Kalessin, a dragon, the eldest
- Therru, a burned child, revealed as Tehanu, and a woman-dragon

=== Publication history ===
Tehanu is the fourth novel set in the fictional archipelago of Earthsea, published almost twenty years after the first three Earthsea novels (1968–1972); it was not the last, despite the subtitle of the first edition, which was later dropped.

- Le Guin, Ursula K. (1990). Tehanu: The Last Book of Earthsea. Earthsea cycle. Vol. 4. New York, New York: Atheneum (Simon & Schuster). ISBN 0689315953. and simultaneously Gollancz in London. Bantam Books reprinted the book in paperback.
- Le Guin, Ursula K. (author, narrator) & Sterlin, Jenny (narrator) (2016). Tehanu: The Earthsea Cycle, Book Four (audiobook). unabridged ed. Landover, Maryland: Recorded Books—RBmedia. ASIN B01G9EP4ZQ. Includes extensive interpretative and explanatory material composed and read by Le Guin, entitled "An Afterward From the Author".

The book has been reprinted many times, including in collections of the Earthsea series or "Earthsea Cycle" by publishers and imprints including Atheneum, Simon & Schuster, Pocket Books, Simon Pulse, and Penguin Books.

== Reception ==
Michael Dirda, writing for The Washington Post, writes that after the "honored and loved" Earthsea trilogy of "deeply imagined" and "finely wrought" books marketed as young-adult novels, Tehanu is "less sheerly exciting" but perhaps "the most moving" as it examines how Ged and Tenar address their own old age. The book revisits the Earthsea themes of balance, integration with one's personal shadow, and trust, but in Dirda's view giving them "a darker, more realistic edge". Further, Tehanu presents the world from a woman's point of view, with a social structure that disfavours women, unheroic men, and child abuse. All this makes the book "meditative, somber, even talky". Dirda notes that Tehanu "reveal[s] what happened to [the series'] hero and heroine in old age", and with its emphasis on these aging, earlier novel protagonists is thus an enlargement of the earlier Earthsea trilogy (which was largely marketed for young adults).

Kirkus Reviews comments that "Yes, there are dragons; but the human story and its meaning are primary here. Unlike Ged's, Le Guin's power is undiminished." It notes that Ged and Tenar are "past middle age", reflecting the slower action, but "even young readers will be beguiled by the flawless, poetic prose, the philosophy expressed in thoughtful, potent metaphor, and the consummately imagined world". The Science Fiction Review summarizes the novel as "Great things happen to great people, whatever their station in life, and wherever they may be. An excellent story and a fine capstone to Earthsea."

== Analysis ==
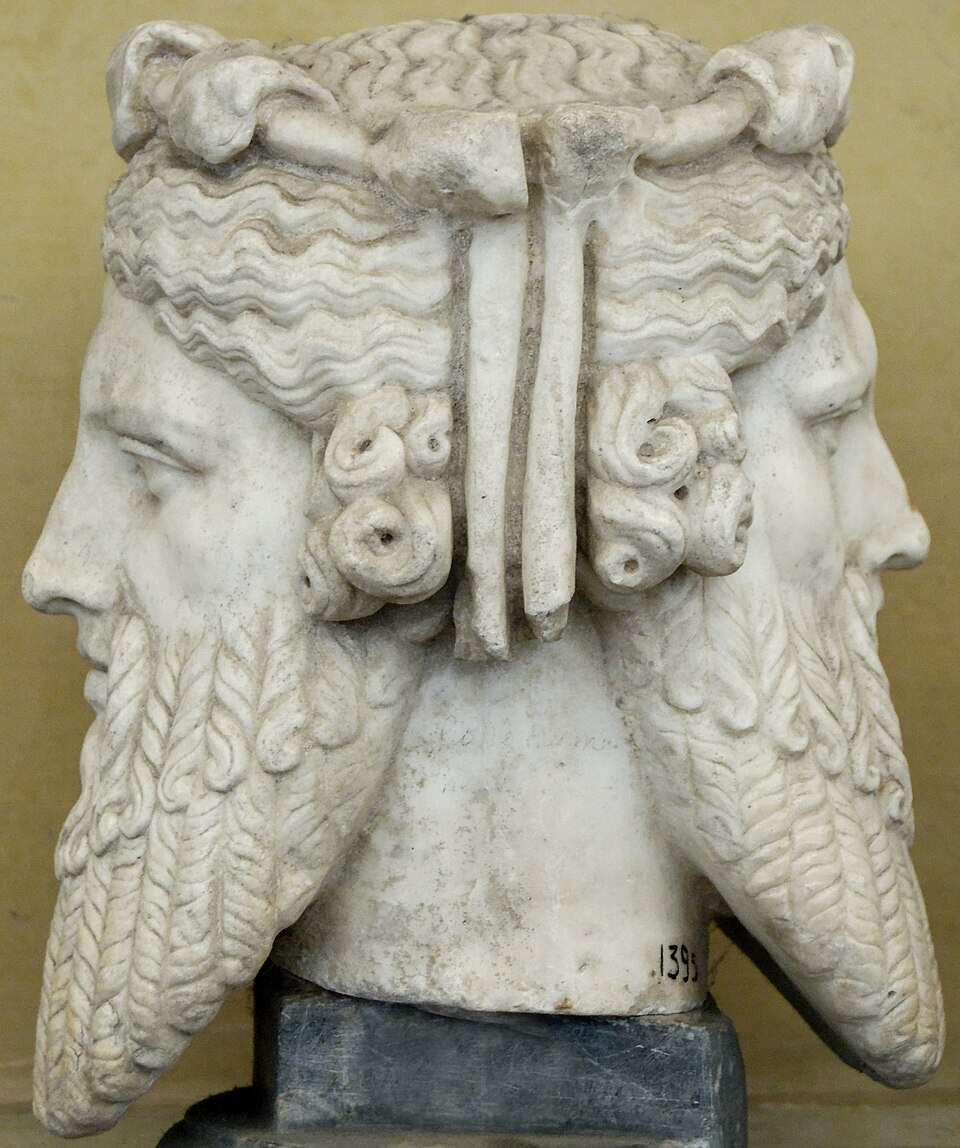
Richard D. Erlich describes the book as being liminal, like the Roman god Janus the doorkeeper, looking both backward (to male-oriented fantasy) and forward (to feminist analysis).

The initial trilogy focuses on the character and quests of Ged, with Tenar as the central character of the second book. Sean Guynes, in Reactor Magazine, calls Tehanu Le Guin's best novel. In his view, it goes beyond the initial trilogy in its willingness to show the reader the characters' dark sides as they grow older. Like The Farthest Shore, it reflects on "power and its loss"; like The Tombs of Atuan, it focuses on gender; but unlike them, it makes use of a new "reflective distance", revisiting the trilogy and addressing "earlier faults" in its writing, just as The Tombs of Atuan had revisited Earthsea's lack of "a female protagonist". Also in Reactor Magazine, Jo Walton finds Tehanu "problematic", writing that it is "a restless book with very strange pacing", but that it is surprising that it "works as well as it does", given the competing demands of "the force of story" – plot, action – and Le Guin's evident intention to place "women's domestic lives" at the novel's centre.

In an analysis from her doctoral dissertation – that Le Guin featured on her webpage – Sharada Bhanu argues that Tehanu functions with Tales from Earthsea and The Other Wind as a second trilogy, unlike the first. In Bhanu's view, the first looked at coming-of-age, while the second presented sexual experience and "middle-aged protagonists", seen "from the outside". This changed the work's focus and "emotional tone". The effect, Bhanu writes, is that the "second trilogy enlarges, interrogates and deconstructs the first", the "cultural ethos" now being feminism. She quotes an Earthsea proverb, "Weak as women's magic; wicked as women's magic", and notes the male focus of the earlier trilogy, with women unable to enter the school of Roke. Tehanu compensates "by presenting a woman's world" from the now middle-aged Tenar's point of view, alongside sympathetic portraits of other women "of various ages and professions", and "weak and limited" men "even when well meaning".

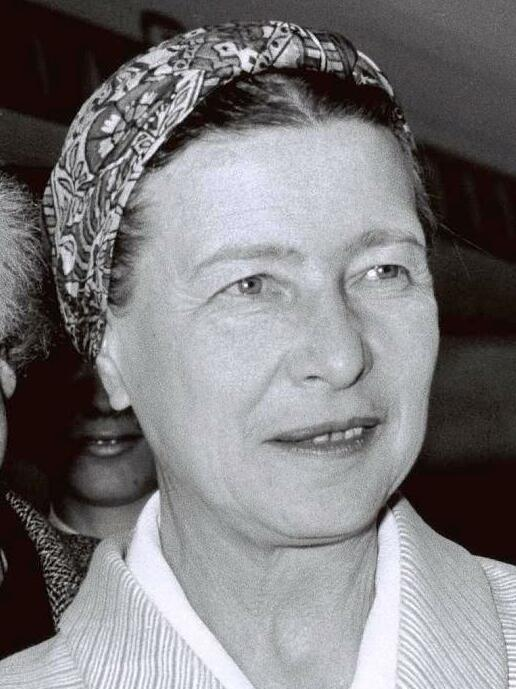
Ursula Le Guin's feminism as seen in Tehanu has been contrasted with that of Simone De Beauvoir (pictured).

The literary scholar Richard D. Erlich devotes an entire chapter, "Earthsea Revisited", of his book Coyote's Song (on Le Guin's teaching stories) to Tehanu: it is the only Earthsea book to receive this treatment. Most of this is an annotated summary of the plot, the notes drawing out literary and philosophical connections with her other works, and with those of other authors including Rilke's Duino Elegies, Shakespeare's Macbeth and King Lear, and the Tao te Ching. Erlich writes that Le Guin and critics agree that Tehanu is "Le Guin's revising and revisioning of Earthsea". A major strand of this consists of putting her "Is Gender Necessary? Redux" into a fiction presentation. Ehrlich argues that the book has a Janus-like aspect, facing both back to her earlier, more male-oriented books, and forwards to feminist writings. He finds this "decorous" for a story which combines emphasis on faces that have one side scarred – both Therru/Tehanu and Sparrowhawk/Ged – and "so much stress on doorways and liminality", attention to in-between space. Erlich concludes the chapter by stating that it is "unquestionably feminist and highly interesting" that Tehanu completes the logical arc from The Tombs of Atuan and other stories towards having "definitely a female protagonist"; and by saying that Tehanu is "an open-ended work" which he (successfully) hoped would not be "The Last Book of Earthsea" claimed in the subtitle.

Erlich compares Le Guin's treatment of immanence in Tehanu to Simone de Beauvoir's usage in her 1949 book The Second Sex, "but with values reversed". De Beauvoir used the term, along with "transcendence", non-metaphysically to denote a woman's situation, being trapped in daily household chores, which she saw as bad. Erlich writes that in The Tombs of Atuan, Tenar was trapped as a high priestess, isolated from daily chores, the point being in his view that high position can be a trap worse than being a 1940s housewife. Erlich writes that immanence is usually good in the Earthsea trilogy, and that Tenar gets to the goal of being, not doing some twenty years before Ged does. He summarizes Le Guin's position as valuing not only the male-style power that modern women may be able to seize from men, but also (in Le Guin's words) "the other room, where women live", meaning, he writes, "a domestic life", including the old-age unmarried partnership of Tenar and Ged.

Erlich writes that what he calles "silences" are an important aspect of Tehanu. In his analysis of the text, he mentions multiple places where readers are obliged to fill in gaps from their "own lives and experience". One such concerns the motives that drive the "villains" of the story, nowhere described by Le Guin. Erlich suggests that the reader needs to apply "a strong suspicion" of men's motives to get Tehanu to work. If the novel were high fantasy, he writes, then an evil wizard like Aspen would be simply a hook for "racist and sexist obsessions with purity and power". But since the book only touches on high fantasy, and is otherwise more down-to-earth, Aspen's "blind misogyny and male pigheadedness" will, Erlich suggests, seem understandable in proportion to how common readers have found those evils to be in the "patriarchal world we inhabit".

Tehanu's relationship to the initial Earthsea trilogy, according to Richard D. Erlich
	A Wizard of Earthsea 1968	The Tombs of Atuan 1970	The Farthest Shore 1972	Tehanu 1990
Protagonist	Ged	Tenar (and Ged)	Ged	Therru/Tehanu
Protagonist's gender	Male	Female (and male)	Male	Female
Genre	High fantasy			Fantasy / philosophical novel

== Awards ==
Tehanu won the 1990 Nebula Award; this made Le Guin the first person to win three Nebula Awards for Best Novel. (Note: Joe Haldeman would go on to equal this number in 2006, winning his third Nebula for Camouflage. Three years later, Le Guin received a fourth Nebula for Powers. As of 2021, she holds the record for the most Best Novel Nebulas.) The book won the Locus Award for Best Fantasy Novel, and was nominated for both the Mythopoeic Fantasy Award and the Homer Award.

== See also ==
- Tales from Earthsea, including "Dragonfly", a postscript to Tehanu

== Sources ==
- Erlich, Richard D. (2009). "Earthsea Revisited: Tehanu". Coyote's Song: The Teaching Stories of Ursula K. Le Guin. Milford series: Popular writers of today. Vol. 72. Rockville, Maryland: Wildside Press. pp. 379–417. ISBN 9781434457752.
