= New Dimension =

New Dimension may refer to:

- A New Dimension, a 1968 album by Willie Bobo
- New Dimension programme, for fire and rescue services in England and Wales
- New Dimension! Crayon Shin-chan the Movie: Battle of Supernatural Powers ~Flying Sushi~, a 2023 Japanese animated film
- New Dimensions, a 1978 album by the Three Degrees
- "New Dimensions" (The Orville), a 2017 television episode
- New Dimensions EP, a 1998 EP By Zion I
- New Dimensions (anthology series), a series of science fiction anthologies edited by Robert Silverberg:
  - New Dimensions 1
  - New Dimensions II
  - New Dimensions 3
  - New Dimensions IV
