= The Books of Earthsea =

Fantasy fiction collection by Ursula K. Le Guin

The Books of Earthsea: The Complete Illustrated Edition
- Author: Ursula K. Le Guin
- Illustrator: Charles Vess
- Cover artist: Charles Vess
- Language: English
- Series: Earthsea
- Genre: Fantasy
- Published: 2018 (Saga Press)
- Publication place: United States
- Media type: Print (hardcover)
- Pages: 992
- ISBN: 1-48-146558-9
- Dewey Decimal: 813/.54
- LC Class: PS3562.E42 B66 2018

The Books of Earthsea is a collection of fantasy fiction and commentary by American author Ursula K. Le Guin, published by Saga Press in 2018 on the 50th anniversary of the publication of the first book of the series, A Wizard of Earthsea. It includes a new introduction, the five Earthsea novels along with afterwords written in 2012, and all the short stories set in the Earthsea world. It is illustrated by Charles Vess.

== Contents ==
- Introduction
- A Wizard of Earthsea
- The Tombs of Atuan
- The Farthest Shore
- Tehanu
- Tales from Earthsea, a collection of short stories
  - The Finder, Darkrose and Diamond, The Bones of the Earth, On the High Marsh, Dragonfly
- The Other Wind
- "A Description of Earthsea", containing details on the geography, history and cultures of Earthsea
- The Word of Unbinding
- The Rule of Names
- The Daughter of Odren (appearing in print for the first time)
- Firelight
- "Earthsea Revisioned", a lecture originally given by Le Guin as "Children, Women, Men and Dragons" at Oxford University on August 7, 1992
