= A Wizard of Earthsea =

1968 fantasy novel by Ursula K. Le Guin

- First edition's cover by illustrator Ruth Robbins
- Author: Ursula K. Le Guin
- Illustrator: Ruth Robbins
- Language: English
- Series: Earthsea
- Release number: 1
- Genre: Fantasy, Bildungsroman
- Published: 1968
- Publisher: Parnassus Press
- Publication place: United States
- Pages: 205 (first edition)
- OCLC: 1210
- LC Class: PZ7.L5215 Wi
- Preceded by: "The Rule of Names"
- Followed by: The Tombs of Atuan

A Wizard of Earthsea is a fantasy novel written by American author Ursula K. Le Guin and first published by the small press Parnassus in 1968. It is regarded as a classic of children's literature and of fantasy, within which it is widely influential. The story is set in the fictional archipelago of Earthsea and centers on a young mage named Ged, born in a village on the island of Gont. He displays great power while still a boy and joins a school of wizardry, where his prickly nature drives him into conflict with a fellow student. During a magical duel, Ged's spell goes awry and releases a shadow creature that attacks him. The novel follows Ged's journey as he seeks to be free of the creature.

The book has often been described as a bildungsroman, or coming-of-age story, as it explores Ged's process of learning to cope with power and come to terms with death. The novel also carries Taoist themes about a fundamental balance in the universe of Earthsea, which wizards are supposed to maintain, closely tied to the idea that language and names have power to affect the material world and alter this balance. The structure of the story is similar to that of an epic poem, although Le Guin subverted a traditional aspect of the genre with her use of a dark-skinned protagonist in contrast to more typical white-skinned heroes.

A Wizard of Earthsea received highly positive reviews, initially as a work for children and later among a general audience. It won the Boston Globe–Horn Book Award in 1969 and was one of the final recipients of the Lewis Carroll Shelf Award in 1979. Margaret Atwood called it one of the "wellsprings" of fantasy literature. Le Guin wrote five subsequent books that are collectively referred to as the Earthsea Cycle, together with A Wizard of Earthsea: The Tombs of Atuan (1971), The Farthest Shore (1972), Tehanu (1990), The Other Wind (2001), and Tales from Earthsea (2001). George Slusser described the series as a "work of high style and imagination", while Amanda Craig said that A Wizard of Earthsea was "the most thrilling, wise, and beautiful children's novel ever".

== Background ==
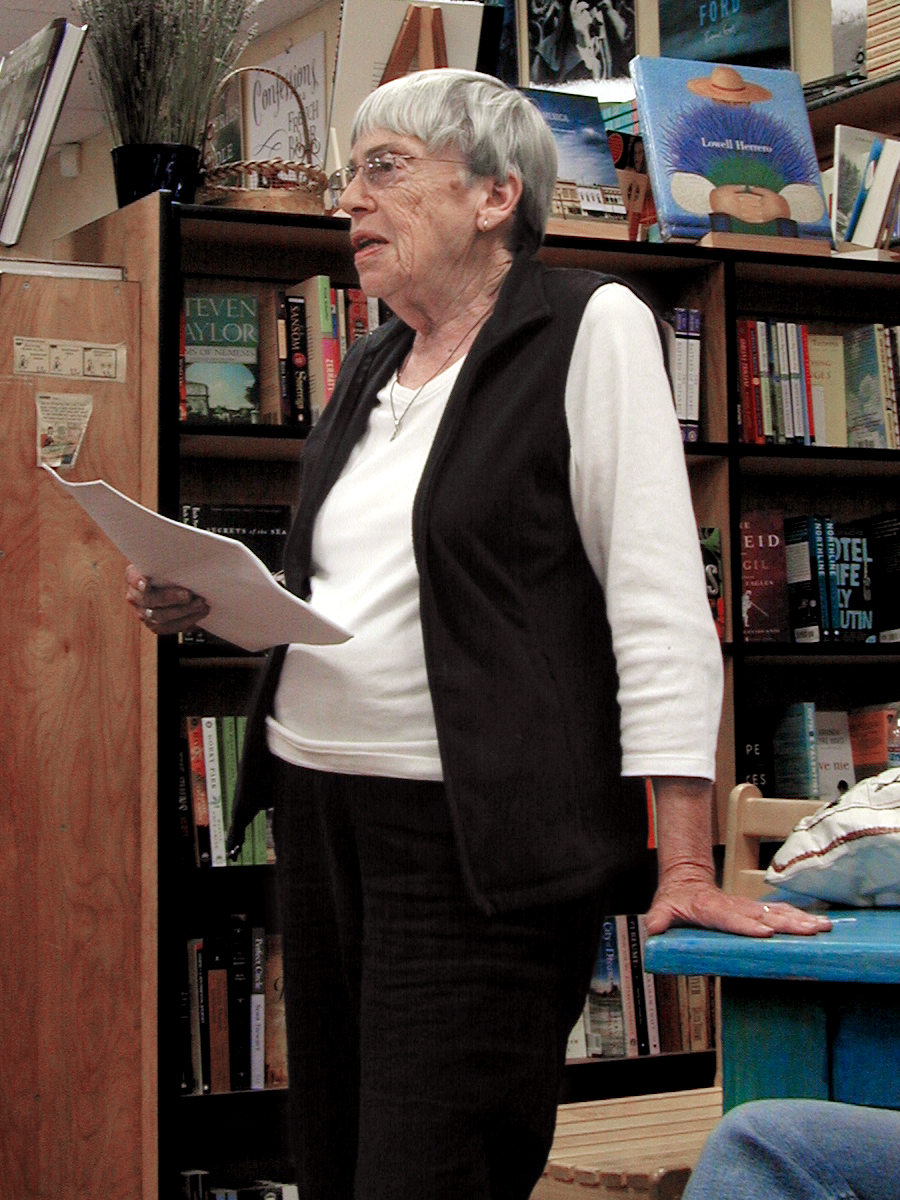
Le Guin giving a reading in 2008

Early concepts for the Earthsea setting were developed in two short stories, "The Rule of Names" (1964) and "The Word of Unbinding" (1964), both published in Fantastic. The stories were later collected in Le Guin's anthology The Wind's Twelve Quarters (1975). Earthsea was also used as the setting for a story she wrote in 1965 or 1966, which was never published. In 1967, Herman Schein (the publisher of Parnassus Press and the husband of Ruth Robbins, the illustrator of the book) asked Le Guin to try writing a book "for older kids", giving her complete freedom over the subject and the approach. She had no previous experience specifically with the genre of young adult literature, which rose in prominence during the late 1960s. Drawing from her short stories, she began work on A Wizard of Earthsea. She has said that the book was in part a response to the image of wizards as ancient and wise, and to wondering where they come from. She later said that she chose the medium of fantasy, and the theme of coming of age, with her intended adolescent audience in mind.

The short stories published in 1964 introduced the world of Earthsea and important concepts in it, such as Le Guin's treatment of magic. "The Rule of Names" also introduced Yevaud, a dragon who features briefly in A Wizard of Earthsea. Her depiction of Earthsea was influenced by her familiarity with Native American legends as well as Norse mythology. Her knowledge of myths and legends, as well as her familial interest in anthropology, have been described by scholar Donna White as allowing her to create "entire cultures" for the islands of Earthsea. The influence of Norse lore in particular can be seen in the characters of the Kargs, who are blonde and blue-eyed, and worship two gods who are brothers. The influence of Taoist thought on Le Guin's writing is also visible in the idea of a cosmic "balance".

== Story ==
=== Setting ===
Earthsea is an archipelago, and the islands were raised from the ocean by a being called Segoy. The world is inhabited by both humans and dragons, and most or all humans have some innate magical gift, some are more gifted sorcerers or wizards. The world is shown as being based on a delicate balance, which most of its inhabitants are aware of, but which is disrupted by somebody in each of the original trilogy of novels. Earthsea is pre-industrial and has diverse cultures within the widespread archipelago. Most of the characters are of the Hardic peoples, who are dark-skinned, and who populate most of the islands. Four large eastern islands are inhabited by the white-skinned Kargish people, who despise magic and see the Hardic folk as evil sorcerers: the Kargs, in turn, are viewed by the Hardic people as barbarians. The far western regions of the archipelago are the realm of the dragons.

=== Plot summary ===
"Only in silence the word,
only in dark the light,
only in dying life:
bright the hawk's flight
on the empty sky."

— From the Creation of Éa, with which A Wizard of Earthsea begins.

The novel follows a young boy called Duny, nicknamed "Sparrowhawk", born on the island of Gont. Discovering that the boy has great innate power, his aunt, a witch, teaches him the little magic she knows. When his village is attacked by Kargish raiders, Duny summons a fog to conceal the village and its inhabitants, enabling the residents to drive off the Kargs. Hearing of this, the powerful mage Ogion takes him as an apprentice, later revealing Duny's "true name"—Ged. Ogion tries to teach Ged about the "equilibrium", the concept that magic can upset the natural order of the world if used improperly. In an attempt to impress a girl, however, Ged searches Ogion's spell books and inadvertently summons a strange shadow, which has to be banished by Ogion. Sensing Ged's eagerness to act and impatience with his slow teaching methods, Ogion asks if he would rather go to the renowned school for wizards on the island of Roke. Ged loves Ogion, but decides to go to the school.

At the school, Ged meets Jasper, and is immediately on bad terms with him. He is befriended by an older student named Vetch, but generally remains aloof from anyone else. Ged's skills inspire admiration from teachers and students alike. During a festival, Jasper acts condescendingly towards Ged, provoking the latter's proud nature. Ged challenges him to a duel of magic, and casts a powerful spell intended to raise the spirit of a legendary dead woman. The spell goes awry and instead releases a shadow creature, which attacks him and scars his face. The Archmage Nemmerle drives the shadow away, but at the cost of his life.

Ged spends many months healing before resuming his studies. The new Archmage, Gensher, describes the shadow as an ancient evil that wishes to possess Ged, and warns him that the creature has no name. Ged eventually graduates and receives his wizard's staff. He then takes up residence in the Ninety Isles, providing the poor villagers protection from the dragons that have seized and taken up residence on the nearby island of Pendor, but discovers that he is still being sought by the shadow. Knowing that he cannot guard against both threats at the same time, he sails to Pendor and gambles his life on a guess of the adult dragon's true name. When he is proved right, the dragon offers to tell him the name of the shadow, but Ged instead extracts a promise that the dragon and his offspring will never threaten the archipelago.

Chased by the shadow, Ged flees to Osskil, having heard of the stone of the Terrenon. He is attacked by the shadow, and barely escapes into the Court of Terrenon. Serret, the lady of the castle, and the same girl that Ged had tried to impress, shows him the stone, and urges Ged to speak to it, claiming it can give him limitless knowledge and power. Recognizing that the stone harbors one of the Old Powers—ancient, powerful, malevolent beings—Ged refuses. He flees and is pursued by the stone's minions, but transforms into a swift falcon and escapes, but Serret, having taken the form of a gull, is killed.

Ged flies back to Ogion on Gont. Unlike Gensher, Ogion insists that all creatures have a name and advises Ged to confront the shadow. Ogion is proved right; when Ged seeks out the shadow, it flees from him. Ged pursues it in a small sailboat, until it lures him into a fog where the boat is wrecked on a reef. Ged recovers with the help of an elderly pair marooned on a small island since they were children; the woman gives Ged part of a broken bracelet as a gift. Ged patches his boat and resumes his pursuit of the creature into the East Reach. On the island of Iffish, he meets his friend Vetch, who insists on joining him. They journey east far beyond the last known lands before they finally come upon the shadow. Naming it with his own name, Ged merges with it and joyfully tells Vetch he is healed and whole.

=== Illustrations ===
Illustration by Ruth Robbins for Chapter 10

The first edition of the book, published in 1968, was illustrated by Ruth Robbins. The cover illustration was in color, and the interior of the book contained a map of the archipelago of Earthsea. In addition, each chapter had a black-and-white illustration by Robbins, similar to a woodcut image. The images represented topics from each chapter; for instance, the very first image depicted the island of Gont, while the illustration for the chapter "The Dragon of Pendor" pictured a flying dragon. The image shown here depicts Ged sailing in his boat Lookfar, and was used in the 10th chapter, "The Open Sea", in which Ged and Vetch travel from Iffish eastward past all known lands to confront the shadow creature.

=== Publication ===
A Wizard of Earthsea was first published in 1968 by Parnassus Press in Berkeley, a year before The Left Hand of Darkness, Le Guin's watershed work. It was a personal landmark for Le Guin, as it represented her first attempt at writing for children; she had written only a handful of other novels and short stories prior to its publication. The book was also her first attempt at writing fantasy, rather than science fiction. A Wizard of Earthsea was the first of Le Guin's books to receive widespread critical attention, and has been described as her best known work, as part of the Earthsea series. The book has been released in numerous editions, including an illustrated Folio Society edition released in 2015. It was also translated into a number of other languages. An omnibus edition of all of Le Guin's Earthsea works was released on the 50th anniversary of the publication of A Wizard of Earthsea in 2018.

Le Guin originally intended for A Wizard of Earthsea to be a standalone novel, but decided to write a sequel after considering the loose ends in the first book, and The Tombs of Atuan was released in 1971. The Farthest Shore was written as a third volume after further consideration, and was published in 1972. The Tombs of Atuan tells of the story of Ged's attempt to make whole the ring of Erreth Akbe, half of which is buried in the tombs of Atuan in the Kargish lands, from where he must steal it. There, he meets the child priestess Tenar, on whom the book focuses. In The Farthest Shore, Ged, who has become Archmage, tries to combat a dwindling of magic across Earthsea, accompanied by Arren, a young prince. The first three books are together seen as the "original trilogy"; in each of these, Ged is shown as trying to heal some imbalance in the world. They were followed by Tehanu (1990), Tales from Earthsea (2001), and The Other Wind (2001), which are sometimes referred to as the "second trilogy".

== Reception ==
=== As children's literature ===
Initial recognition for the book was from children's-book critics, among whom it garnered acclaim. A Wizard of Earthsea received an even more positive response in the United Kingdom when it was released there in 1971, which, according to White, reflected the greater admiration of British critics for children's fantasy. In her 1975 annotated collection Fantasy for Children, British critic Naomi Lewis described it in the following terms: "[It is not] the easiest book for casual browsing, but readers who take the step will find themselves in one of the most important works of fantasy of our time." Similarly, literary scholar Margaret Esmonde wrote in 1981 that "Le Guin has ... enriched children's literature with what may be its finest high fantasy", while a review in The Guardian by author and journalist Amanda Craig said it was "The most thrilling, wise and beautiful children's novel ever, [written] in prose as taut and clean as a ship's sail."

In discussing the book for a gathering of children's librarians, Eleanor Cameron praised the world building in the story, saying "it is as if [Le Guin] herself has lived on the archipelago." Author David Mitchell called the titular character Ged a "superb creation", and argued that he was a more relatable wizard than those featured in prominent works of fantasy at the time. According to him, characters such as Gandalf were "variants on the archetype of Merlin, a Caucasian scholarly aristocrat amongst sorcerers" with little room to grow, whereas Ged developed as a character through his story. Mitchell also praised the other characters in the story, who he said seemed to have a "fully thought-out inner life" despite being fleeting presences. The 1995 Encyclopedia of Science Fiction said that the Earthsea books had been considered the finest science fiction books for children in the post-World War II period.

=== As fantasy ===
Commentators have noted that the Earthsea novels in general received less critical attention because they were considered children's books. Le Guin herself took exception to this treatment of children's literature, describing it as "adult chauvinist piggery". In 1976, literary scholar George Slusser criticized the "silly publication classification designating the original series as 'children's literature'". Barbara Bucknall stated that "Le Guin was not writing for young children when she wrote these fantasies, nor yet for adults. She was writing for 'older kids.' But in fact she can be read, like Tolkien, by ten-year-olds and by adults. These stories are ageless because they deal with problems that confront us at any age." Only in later years did A Wizard of Earthsea receive attention from a more general audience. Literary scholar Tom Shippey was among the first to treat A Wizard of Earthsea as serious literature, assuming in his analysis of the volume that it belonged alongside works by C. S. Lewis and Fyodor Dostoevsky, among others. Margaret Atwood said that she saw the book as "a fantasy book for adults", and added that the book could be categorized as either young adult fiction or as fantasy, but since it dealt with themes such as "life and mortality and who are we as human beings", it could be read and enjoyed by anybody older than twelve. The Encyclopedia of Science Fiction echoed this view, saying the series's appeal went "far beyond" the young adults for whom it was written. It went on to praise the book as "austere but vivid", and said the series was more thoughtful than the Narnia books by C. S. Lewis.

In his 1980 history of fantasy, Brian Attebery called the Earthsea trilogy "the most challenging and richest American fantasy to date". Slusser described the Earthsea cycle as a "work of high style and imagination", and the original trilogy of books a product of "genuine epic vision". In 1974, critic Robert Scholes compared Le Guin's work favorably to that of C. S. Lewis, saying, "Where C. S. Lewis worked out a specifically Christian set of values, Ursula LeGuin works not with a theology but with an ecology, a cosmology, a reverence for the universe as a self-regulating structure." He added that Le Guin's three Earthsea novels were themselves a sufficient legacy for anybody to leave. In 2014, David Pringle called it "a beautiful story—poetic, thrilling, and profound".

=== Accolades ===
A Wizard of Earthsea won or contributed to several awards for Le Guin. It won the Boston Globe–Horn Book Award in 1969, and was one of the last winners of the Lewis Carroll Shelf Award ten years later. In 1984 it won the Złota Sepulka or the "Golden Sepulka" in Poland. In 2000 Le Guin was given the Margaret A. Edwards Award by the American Library Association for young adult literature. The award cited six of her works, including the first four Earthsea volumes, The Left Hand of Darkness, and The Beginning Place. A 1987 poll in Locus ranked A Wizard of Earthsea third among "All-Time Best Fantasy Novels", while in 2014 Pringle listed it at number 39 in his list of the 100 best novels in modern fantasy.

=== Influence ===
The book has been seen as widely influential within the genre of fantasy. Margaret Atwood has called A Wizard of Earthsea one of the "wellsprings" of fantasy literature. The book has been compared to major works of high fantasy such as J. R. R. Tolkien's The Lord of the Rings and L. Frank Baum's The Wonderful Wizard of Oz. The notion that names can exert power is also present in Hayao Miyazaki's 2001 film Spirited Away; critics have suggested that that idea originated with Le Guin's Earthsea series. Novelist David Mitchell, author of books such as Cloud Atlas, described A Wizard of Earthsea as having a strong influence on him, and said that he felt a desire to "wield words with the same power as Ursula Le Guin".

Modern writers have credited A Wizard of Earthsea for introducing the idea of a "wizard school", which would later be made famous by the Harry Potter series of books, and with popularizing the trope of a boy wizard, also present in Harry Potter. Reviewers have also commented that the basic premise of A Wizard of Earthsea, that of a talented boy going to a wizard's school and making an enemy with whom he has a close connection, is also the premise of Harry Potter. Ged also receives a facial scar from the shadow, as Harry Potter does from Voldemort. Commenting on the similarity, Le Guin said that she did not feel that J. K. Rowling "ripped her off", but that Rowling's books received too much praise for supposed originality, and that Rowling "could have been more gracious about her predecessors. My incredulity was at the critics who found the first book wonderfully original. She has many virtues, but originality isn't one of them. That hurt."

== Themes ==
=== Coming of age ===
A Wizard of Earthsea focuses on Ged's adolescence and coming of age, and along with the other two works of the original Earthsea trilogy forms a part of Le Guin's dynamic portrayal of the process of growing old. The three novels together follow Ged from youth to old age, and each of them also follow the coming of age of a different character. The novel is frequently described as a Bildungsroman. Scholar Mike Cadden stated that the book is a convincing tale "to a reader as young and possibly as headstrong as Ged, and therefore sympathetic to him". Ged's coming of age is also intertwined with the physical journey he undertakes through the novel.

Ged is depicted as proud and yet unsure of himself in multiple situations: early in his apprenticeship he believes Ogion to be mocking him, and later, at Roke, feels put upon by Jasper. In both cases, he believes that others do not appreciate his greatness, and Le Guin's sympathetic narration does not immediately contradict this belief. Cadden writes that Le Guin allows young readers to sympathize with Ged, and only gradually realize that there is a price to be paid for his actions, as he learns to discipline his magical powers. Similarly, as Ged begins his apprenticeship with Ogion, he imagines that he will be taught mysterious aspects of wizardry, and has visions of transforming himself into other creatures, but gradually comes to see that Ogion's important lessons are those about his own self.

The passage at the end of the novel, wherein Ged finally accepts the shadow as a part of himself and is thus released from its terror, has been pointed to by reviewers as a rite of passage. Jeanne Walker, for example, wrote that the rite of passage at the end was an analogue for the entire plot of A Wizard of Earthsea, and that the plot itself plays the role of a rite of passage for an adolescent reader. Walker goes on to say, "The entire action of A Wizard of Earthsea ... portrays the hero's slow realization of what it means to be an individual in society and a self in relation to higher powers." Many readers and critics have commented on similarities between Ged's process of growing up and ideas in Jungian psychology. The young Ged has a scary encounter with a shadow creature, which he later realizes is the dark side of himself. It is only after he recognizes and merges with the shadow that he becomes a whole person. Le Guin said that she had never read Jung before writing the Earthsea novels.

Le Guin described coming of age as the main theme of the book, and wrote in a 1973 essay that she chose that theme since she was writing for an adolescent audience. She stated that "Coming of age ... is a process that took me many years; I finished it, so far as I ever will, at about age thirty-one; and so I feel rather deeply about it. So do most adolescents. It's their main occupation, in fact." She also said that fantasy was best suited as a medium for describing coming of age, because exploring the subconscious was difficult using the language of "rational daily life". The coming of age that Le Guin focused on included not just psychological development, but moral changes as well. Ged needs to recognize the balance between his power and his responsibility to use it well, a recognition which comes as he travels to the stone of Terrenon and sees the temptation that that power represents.

=== Equilibrium and Taoist themes ===
The world of Earthsea is depicted as being based on a delicate balance, which most of its inhabitants are aware of, but which is disrupted by somebody in each of the original trilogy of novels. This includes an equilibrium between land and sea (implicit in the name Earthsea), and between people and their natural environment. In addition to physical equilibrium, there is a larger cosmic equilibrium, which everybody is aware of, and which wizards are tasked with maintaining. Describing this aspect of Earthsea, Elizabeth Cummins wrote, "The principle of balanced powers, the recognition that every act affects self, society, world, and cosmos, is both a physical and a moral principle of Le Guin's fantasy world." The concept of balance is related to the novel's other major theme of coming of age, as Ged's knowledge of the consequences of his own actions for good or ill is necessary for him to understand how the balance is maintained. While at the school of Roke, the Master Hand tells him:

But you must not change one thing, one pebble, one grain of sand, until you know what good and evil will follow on that act. The world is in balance, in Equilibrium. A wizard's power of Changing and of Summoning can shake the balance of the world. It is dangerous, that power. It is most perilous. It must follow knowledge, and serve need. To light a candle is to cast a shadow.

The influence of Taoism on Le Guin's writing is evident through much of the book, especially in her depiction of the "balance". At the end of the novel, Ged may be seen to embody the Taoist way of life, as he has learned not to act unless absolutely necessary. He has also learned that seeming opposites, like light and dark or good and evil, are actually interdependent. Light and dark themselves are recurring images within the story. Reviewers have identified this belief as evidence of a conservative ideology within the story, shared with much of fantasy. In emphasizing concerns over balance and equilibrium, scholars have argued, Le Guin essentially justifies the status quo, which wizards strive to maintain. This tendency is in contrast to Le Guin's science fiction writing, in which change is shown to have value.

The nature of human evil forms a significant related theme through A Wizard of Earthsea as well as the other Earthsea novels. As with other works by Le Guin, evil is shown as a misunderstanding of the balance of life. Ged is born with great power in him, but the pride that he takes in his power leads to his downfall; he tries to demonstrate his strength by bringing a spirit back from the dead, and in performing this act against the laws of nature, releases the shadow that attacks him. Slusser suggests that although he is provoked into performing dangerous spells first by the girl on Gont and then by Jasper, this provocation exists in Ged's mind. He is shown as unwilling to look within himself and see the pride that drives him to do what he does. When he accepts the shadow into himself, he also finally accepts responsibility for his own actions, and by accepting his own mortality he is able to free himself. His companion Vetch describes the moment by saying

that Ged had neither lost nor won but, naming the shadow of his death with his own name, had made himself whole: a man: who, knowing his whole true self, cannot be used or possessed by any power other than himself, and whose life therefore is lived for life's sake and never in the service of ruin, or pain, or hatred, or the dark.

Thus, although there are several dark powers in Earthsea (like the stone of Terrenon and the Nameless Ones of Atuan), the true evil was not one of these powers, or even death, but Ged's actions that went against the balance of nature. This is contrary to conventional Western and Christian storytelling, in which light and darkness are often considered opposites, and are seen as symbolizing good and evil, which are constantly in conflict. On two different occasions, Ged is tempted to try to defy death and evil, but eventually learns that neither can be eliminated: instead, he chooses not to serve evil, and stops denying death.

=== True names ===
In Le Guin's fictional universe, to know the true name of an object or a person is to have power over it. Each child is given a true name when they reach puberty, a name which they share only with close friends. Several of the dragons in the later Earthsea novels, like Orm Embar and Kalessin, are shown as living openly with their names, which do not give anybody power over them. In A Wizard of Earthsea, however, Ged is shown to have power over Yevaud. Cadden writes that this is because Yevaud still has attachment to riches and material possessions, and is thus bound by the power of his name. Wizards exert their influence over the equilibrium through the use of names, thus linking this theme to Le Guin's depiction of a cosmic balance. According to Cummins, this is Le Guin's way of demonstrating the power of language in shaping reality. Since language is the tool we use for communicating about the environment, she argues that it also allows humans to affect the environment, and the wizards' power to use names symbolizes this. Cummins went on to draw an analogy between the wizards' use of names to change things with the creative use of words in fictional writing. Shippey wrote that Earthsea magic seems to work through what he called the "Rumpelstiltskin theory", in which names have power. He argued that this portrayal was part of Le Guin's effort to emphasize the power of words over objects, which, according to Shippey, was in contrast to the ideology of other writers, such as James Frazer in The Golden Bough. Esmonde argued that each of the first three Earthsea books hinged on an act of trust. In A Wizard of Earthsea, Vetch trusts Ged with his true name when the latter is at his lowest ebb emotionally, thus giving Ged complete power over him. Ged later offers Tenar the same gift in The Tombs of Atuan, thereby allowing her to learn trust.

== Style and structure ==
=== Language and mood ===
A Wizard of Earthsea and other novels of the Earthsea cycle differ notably from Le Guin's early Hainish cycle works, although they were written at a similar time. George Slusser described the Earthsea works as providing a counterweight to the "excessive pessimism" of the Hainish novels. He saw the former as depicting individual action in a favorable light, in contrast to works such as "Vaster than Empires and More Slow". The Encyclopedia of Science Fiction said the book was pervaded by a "grave joyfulness". In discussing the style of her fantasy works, Le Guin herself said that in fantasy it was necessary to be clear and direct with language, because there is no known framework for the reader's mind to rest upon.

The story often appears to assume that readers are familiar with the geography and history of Earthsea, a technique which allowed Le Guin to avoid exposition: a reviewer wrote that this method "gives Le Guin's world the mysterious depths of Tolkien's, but without his tiresome back-stories and versifying". In keeping with the notion of an epic, the narration switches from looking ahead into Ged's future and looking back into the past of Earthsea. At the same time, Slusser described the mood of the novel as "strange and dreamlike", fluctuating between objective reality and the thoughts in Ged's mind; some of Ged's adversaries are real, while others are phantoms. This narrative technique, which Cadden characterizes as "free indirect discourse", makes the narrator of the book seem sympathetic to the protagonist, and does not distance his thoughts from the reader.

=== Myth and epic ===
A Wizard of Earthsea has strong elements of an epic; for instance, Ged's place in Earthsea history is described at the very beginning of the book in the following terms: "some say the greatest, and surely the greatest voyager, was the man called Sparrowhawk, who in his day became both dragonlord and Archmage." The story also begins with words from the Earthsea song "The Creation of Éa", which forms a ritualistic beginning to the book. The teller of the story then goes on to say that it is from Ged's youth, thereby establishing context for the rest of the book. In comparison with the protagonists of many of Le Guin's other works, Ged is superficially a typical hero, a mage who sets out on a quest. Reviewers have compared A Wizard of Earthsea to epics such as Beowulf. Scholar Virginia White argued that the story followed a structure common to epics in which the protagonist begins an adventure, faces trials along the way, and eventually returns in triumph. White went on to suggest that this structure can be seen in the series as a whole, as well as in the individual volumes.

Le Guin subverted many of the tropes typical to such "monomyths"; the protagonists of her story were all dark-skinned, in comparison to the white-skinned heroes more traditionally used; the Kargish antagonists, in contrast, were white-skinned, a switching of race roles that has been remarked upon by multiple critics. Critics have also cited her use of characters from multiple class backgrounds as a choice subversive to conventional Western fantasy. At the same time, reviewers questioned Le Guin's treatment of gender in A Wizard of Earthsea, and the original trilogy as a whole. Le Guin, who later became known as a feminist, chose to restrict the use of magic to men and boys in the first volume of Earthsea. Initial critical reactions to A Wizard of Earthsea saw Ged's gender as incidental. In contrast, The Tombs of Atuan saw Le Guin intentionally tell a female coming-of-age story, which was nonetheless described as perpetuating a male-dominated model of Earthsea. Tehanu (1990), published as the fourth volume of Earthsea 18 years after the third, has been described both by Le Guin and her commentators as a feminist re-imagining of the series, in which the power and status of the chief characters are reversed, and the patriarchal social structure questioned. Commenting in 1993, Le Guin wrote that she could not continue [Earthsea after 1972] until she had "wrestled with the angels of the feminist consciousness".

Several critics have argued that by combining elements of epic, Bildungsroman, and young adult fiction, Le Guin succeeded in blurring the boundaries of conventional genres. In a 1975 commentary Francis Molson argued that the series should be referred to as "ethical fantasy", a term which acknowledged that the story did not always follow the tropes of heroic fantasy, and the moral questions that it raised. The term did not become popular. A similar argument was made by children's literature critic Cordelia Sherman in 1985; she argued that A Wizard of Earthsea and the rest of the series sought "to teach children by dramatic example what it means to be a good adult".

== Adaptations ==
A condensed, illustrated version of the first chapter was printed by World Book in the third volume of Childcraft in 1989. Multiple audio versions of the book have been released. BBC Radio produced a radioplay version in 1996 narrated by Judi Dench, and a six-part series adapting the Earthsea novels in 2015, broadcast on Radio 4 Extra. In 2011, the work was produced as an unabridged recording performed by Robert Inglis. Fred Fordham adapted the complete novel into a graphic novel titled A Wizard of Earthsea: A Graphic Novel, published in March 2025 by Clarion Books. The graphic novel won the 2026 Hugo Award for Best Graphic Story or Comic.

Two screen adaptations of the story have also been produced. An original mini-series titled Legend of Earthsea was broadcast in 2004 on the Sci Fi Channel. It is based very loosely on A Wizard of Earthsea and The Tombs of Atuan. In an article published in Salon, Le Guin expressed strong displeasure at the result. She stated that by casting a "petulant white kid" as Ged (who has red-brown skin in the book) the series "whitewashed Earthsea", and had ignored her choice to write the story of a non-white character, a choice she said was central to the book. This sentiment was shared by a review in The Ultimate Encyclopedia of Fantasy, which said that Legend of Earthsea "totally missed the point" of Le Guin's novels, "ripping out all the subtlety, nuance and beauty of the books and inserting boring cliches, painful stereotypes and a very unwelcome 'epic' war in their place".

Studio Ghibli released an adaptation of the series in 2006 titled Tales from Earthsea. The film very loosely combines elements of the first, third, and fourth books into a new story based on Hayao Miyazaki's manga Shuna's Journey. Le Guin commented with displeasure on the filmmaking process, saying that she had acquiesced to the adaptation believing Hayao Miyazaki would be producing the film himself, which was eventually not the case. Le Guin praised the imagery of the film, but disliked the use of violence. She also expressed dissatisfaction with the portrayal of morality, and in particular the use of a villain who could be slain as a means of resolving conflict, which she said was antithetical to the message of the book. The film received generally mixed responses.
