= True name =

Name of a thing or being that expresses its true nature

A true name (sometimes also real name) is a name of a thing or being that expresses, or is somehow identical to, its true nature. The notion that language, or some specific sacred language, refers to things by their true names has been central to philosophical study as well as various traditions of magic, religious invocation, and mysticism (mantras) since antiquity.

== Philosophical and religious contexts ==
The true name of the Egyptian sun god Ra was revealed to Isis through an elaborate trick. This gave Isis complete power over Ra and allowed her to put her son Horus on the throne.

Socrates in Plato's Cratylus considers, without taking a position, the possibility whether names are "conventional" or "natural", natural being the "True name" ([τῇ ἀληθείᾳ ὄνομα]), that is, whether language is a system of arbitrary signs or whether words have an intrinsic relation to the things they signify (this anti-conventionalist position is called Cratylism).

The Roman goddess Angerona guarded the true name of Rome.

Hellenistic Judaism emphasized the divine nature of logos, later adopted by the Gospel of John. The true name of God plays a central role in Kabbalism (see Gematria, Temurah, the tetragrammaton) and to some extent in Sufism (see 100th name of God). The ancient Jews considered God's true name so potent that its invocation conferred upon the speaker tremendous power over His creations. To prevent abuse of this power, as well as to avoid blasphemy, the name of God was always taboo, and increasingly disused so that by the time of Jesus their High Priest was supposedly the only individual who spoke it aloud — and then only in the Holy of Holies upon the Day of Atonement.

Also in a Biblical context, in the tale of Jacob's nocturnal wrestling with an anonymous angel, the angel refuses to reveal his own name to Jacob even after the angel's submission at dawn. Thereafter Jacob obtains a new name which signifies his successful struggle to God and man, and names the place to commemorate his surviving an encounter with the Divine.

In the neo-Charismatic Christian practice of spiritual mapping, commonly used in the New Apostolic Reformation movement, prophets discover the names of territorial spirits believed to rule over geographic areas and social spheres in order to defeat them through spiritual warfare rituals and prayer.

Chinese Daoist traditions such as the Three Sovereigns corpus emphasize the capacity of talismans, charts, and diagrams to depict the true forms (zhenxing 真形) and true names (zhenming 真名) of demons and spirits. These talismanic representations are considered to be windows into the metaphysical substance and immutable essence of things—that is, images of the eternal Dao without form. The true form or name of a spirit inscribed on a talisman is legible only to supernatural beings, and gives a sort of temporary "control" over the entity whose name or form is possessed.

== Folklore and literature ==
In Jewish tradition, when several children have died in a family the next that is born has no name given to it, but is referred to as "Alter" (Yiddish: אלטער, literally 'old'), or Alterke (diminutive), the view being that the Angel of Death, not knowing the name of the child, will not be able to seize it. When such a child attains the marriageable age, a new name, generally that of one of the Patriarchs, is given to it.

When captured by Polyphemus, Homer's Odysseus is careful not to reveal his name; when asked for it, Odysseus tells the giant that he is "Οὖτις", which means 'nobody'. But later, having escaped after blinding Polyphemus and thinking himself beyond Polyphemus' power, Odysseus – in an act of hubris that was to cause enormous problems later – boastfully reveals his real name; now knowing his real name, Polyphemus was able to call down upon Odysseus the revenge of his father, the sea god, Poseidon. Many later episodes of the Odyssey depict Odysseus facing the relentless hostility of Poseidon – all of which he could have avoided had he persisted in keeping his real name secret.

According to practices in folklore, referred to as 'the Law of Names', knowledge of a true name allows one to affect another person or being magically. It is stated that knowing someone's, or something's, true name therefore gives the person (who knows the true name) power over them. This effect is used in many tales, such as in the German fairytale of Rumpelstiltskin: within Rumpelstiltskin and all its variants, the girl can free herself from the power of a supernatural helper who demands her child by learning its name.

A legend of Saint Olaf recounts how a troll built a church for the saint at a fantastic speed and price, but the saint was able to free himself by learning the troll's name during a walk in the woods. Similarly, the belief that children who were not yet baptised were in particular danger of having the fairies kidnap them and leave changelings in their place may stem from their unnamed state. In the Scandinavian variants of the ballad Earl Brand, the hero can defeat all his enemies until the heroine, running away with him, pleads with him by name to spare her youngest brother.

In Scandinavian beliefs, more magical beasts, such as the Nix, could be defeated by calling their name. For the same reason significant objects in Germanic mythology, which were considered to have some kind of intrinsic personality, had their own names too, for example the legendary Sword Balmung.

In the folklore of Northern England, there was the belief that a boggart should never be named, for when the boggart was given a name, it could not be reasoned with nor persuaded, but would become uncontrollable and destructive.

Giacomo Puccini used a similar theme in the opera Turandot. The plot turns on whether or not Princess Turandot could learn the name of her unwanted suitor. If she does, she could execute him; if she does not, she would have to marry him.

Other names were rather avoided rather than used in a usage bordering taboo. For example, Galician has some generic or alternative names to refer to dangerous animals, in the fear that using their actual name would make them appear: becha ("beast") for serpe ("snake"), renarte ("clever", cognate to French) instead of raposa ("fox"), and others for "the wolf" or "the bear".

== In popular culture and fiction ==
In some fantasy writing, magic works by evoking true names; there, characters often go to great lengths to conceal their true names and similar great lengths to discover their opponents'. In some settings, such as Ursula K. Le Guin's Earthsea, this is true for all beings. In others, as in Larry Niven's The Magic Goes Away, it applies only to those of magical inclination, as when a wizard was revived from the dead only by another who found his name, and even then only with great difficulty. Finding a true name may require arcane procedures. In Earthsea, a wizard must listen for and give the hero his true name; this is performed in both Le Guin's A Wizard of Earthsea and The Tombs of Atuan.

- In Arthur C. Clarke's short story The Nine Billion Names of God, the universe ends when all of God's names are discovered by Tibetan monks.
- In Glen Cook's Black Company series, speaking a sorcerer's true name aloud can snuff out their magical power. All the magic users in the series are referred to by pseudonyms, and many of them went to great lengths to kill anyone who knew their original names.
- In Christopher Paolini's Inheritance Cycle, magicians can control someone by learning their true name, and use the true name of inanimate objects in spells.
- Patricia Wrede, in her novel Snow-White and Rose-Red, has a character not succumb to a spell because the caster did not know the name he was baptized by.
- Patricia McKillip, in her novel The Forgotten Beasts of Eld, wizards, including the main character Sybel, can call people and creatures using their true name.
- In Operation Chaos, Poul Anderson has the doctor who delivers a baby issue not only a regular birth certificate, but a secret one, with the newborn's name; the hero, born before such precautions were routine, is glad to hide his daughter's true name.
- In the Bartimaeus Trilogy by Jonathan Stroud, a magician cannot have full control over a demon if the demon knows the magician's true name. As a result, all magicians have records of their true names destroyed during childhood and take a new name around adolescence.
- In Rick Riordan's The Kane Chronicles, all people and gods also have true names which give great but not total power over them. The Lightning Thief, a previous novel of Riordan's, also emphasizes on the importance of using names, particularly the names of gods.
- In the Fate series, a character's true name is their original identity, which grants significant power to those who know it. (Note: Powers include the ability to discover their history, skills, and weaknesses. Characters are put into classes, such as Rider, Archer, or Saber, and are named like that. For example, the character Astolfo is often called the Rider of Black, Astolfo being his true name.)
- In J. R. R. Tolkien's The Hobbit, Bilbo Baggins uses a great deal of trickery to keep the dragon, Smaug, from learning his name. Even the sheltered hobbit realizes that revealing his name would be dangerous.
- In Ursula K. Le Guin's Earthsea canon, and specifically in her seminal short story "The Rule of Names", knowledge of the true name of a thing confers power over it.
- True names and speech are the basis for magic in Diane Duane's Young Wizards series.
- The dragons of Deltora Quest believe that knowledge of their true name gives others power over them, and will thus only reveal it to trusted confidants or in dire need.
- The concept is also prominently present in The Kingkiller Chronicle by Patrick Rothfuss. (Note: "Namers" in The Kingkiller Chronicle are powerful people who know how to call the true name of anything both animate and inanimate so that they have mastery over it. The name given at birth, however, is not a true name. Instead, the true name, or "deep name" is incredibly complex as it describes the named thing in its entirety. The story also includes speculation over beings and materials that are "nameless".)
- Lloyd Alexander's The Chronicles of Prydain utilizes the concept as well.
- Multiple variants of magic utilizing or grounded in the power of true names have appeared in the Dungeons & Dragons role-playing game, though never as a bedrock element of the game. For instance, certain spells are more powerful if the target's true name is known. In the Cold Cereal Trilogy true names were used to control a person. (Note: Nimue (the Lady of the Lake) used it to freeze people. The story Trap the Soul is one such example, where knowledge of a true name allows the capture of even those otherwise immune to magic.)
- In the role-playing setting World of Darkness, the concept of True Names is very expansive. (Note: The True Name of a being in World of Darkness is like a platonic blueprint to the creature. A human's True Name can even change after life-altering events. It is a description of the being, from its internal organs to its very soul. All living creatures have one, but those with more intelligence have more complex True Names. A Fallen has a True Name given directly by God, but they are unpronounceable by mortal tongues because they are not words or names in the traditional sense; rather, they are a collection of abstract sounds and concepts, such as the sound of a hundred children laughing at once or the wind whistling over the entrance of a cavern. A Fallen's Celestial Name will suffice to fill out the power a True Name has over other beings. Magic is also easier to cast and stronger against a target whose True Name is known.)
- In Jim Butcher's The Dresden Files a wizard or other magical being can gain power over anyone by knowing their name, if the invoker has heard it spoken by its owner; however, as humans' names change with their nature, their magical power generally decays after a time.
- In the Doctor Who episode "The Shakespeare Code", the Carrionites are a species of witch-like beings who use words as a form of magic power. Particularly potent is someone's name, but it will only work once. The Doctor repels the Carrionites at one point using their name.
- In the manga series Bleach, a shinigami (death god) must learn the true name of his or her sword, known as a zanpakutou.
- In the television series Once Upon a Time, recurring antagonist Rumplestiltskin (portrayed by Robert Carlyle) stresses on the importance of using someone or something's proper name.
- In the book series The Symphony of Ages by Elizabeth Haydon, the main character Rhapsody is a bard who discovers the gift of True Naming, giving her the ability to do many wondrous things such as changing a person's nature, freeing them of magical slavery or granting them new supernatural abilities to even camouflaging a group of adventurers in plant life to avoid detection by assassins and bandits.
- In the book series Skulduggery Pleasant by Derek Landy, every person has a name that they choose which is used to protect their other names: A name which is given to them at birth that can be used to control a person to a limited extent and a true name that can be used to control that person to an unlimited degree.
- In Superman comics, the 5th-dimensional imp Mr. Mxyzptlk can be banished from our dimension if he is tricked into reciting his own name backwards (Kltpzyxm).
- The SCP Foundation object "Taboo" is described as a location containing objects and beings capable of appearing when their names are said and stealing the names of others.
- In the manga and anime series Death Note, the premise is about the ability to kill people simply using their true name and face (which is visible to beings called shinigami). People are also able to use aliases, however, the Death Note must only have the actual name to work.
- A character remembering their true name may be an important means of maintaining mastery of their own life. In Hayao Miyazaki's movie Spirited Away, Yubaba, the witch who runs the bathhouse, ensures loyalty by stealing the names of her subjects. (Note: For example, one of the witch's most loyal subjects, the spirit of the Kohaku River, has his name taken and is given a slave name: Haku. He forgets his name, and it is in this way 'taken' from him; he warns Chihiro Ogino against the dangers of forgetting her own name. She frees him when she recognises him and he then remembers and 'takes back' his name and is freed from the clutches of the witch.)
- In the cyberpunk genre following Vernor Vinge's 1981 True Names and the work of William Gibson, much of the plot involved interactions between people's virtual selves in cyberspace. (Note: Learning a fellow cyberpunk hacker's real-world name (i.e., their "true name") could allow you to turn them in to the government or otherwise blackmail them, conveying a kind of power that could be considered analogous to the equivalent concept of myth and legend.)
- In the Faery Rebels trilogy by R.J Anderson, having knowledge of a faeries true name and speaking it gives one full power over that faery. (Note: Anderson's faes' true names can also be forcefully revealed through a dark ritual that uses the victim's blood. A fae's true name can only be changed using the Stone of Naming, of which there is only one.)
- In the early 1990s, Vietnamese Zen Buddhist monk Thich Nhat Hanh published a collection of poems titled Call Me by My True Names.

== See also ==
- Adamic language
- Bouba/kiki effect
- Enochian
- Incantation#Magic words
  - Magic word
- Ineffability
- Kotodama (Japanese belief of the same idea)
- Law of contagion
- Logos
- Magic word
- Mantra
- Names of God
- Noa-name
- Om
  - Om mani padme hum
- Phonosemantics
- Satnam
- Shabda
- Sympathetic magic

== Sources ==
- Clute, J.; Grant, J., eds. (1997). "True name". The Encyclopedia of Fantasy. Orbit Books (UK); St. Martin's Press (US). p. 966. ISBN 0-312-19869-8.
- Eco, U. (1993). La Ricerca della Lingua Perfetta nella Cultura Europea [The Search for the Perfect Language in the European Culture] (English ed.). Fontana Press. ISBN 0-00-686378-7.
