= The Wind's Twelve Quarters =

1975 collection of short stories

- Cover of the first edition
- Author: Ursula K. Le Guin
- Cover artist: Patricia Voehl
- Language: English
- Genre: Science fiction, fantasy
- Published: 1975 (Harper & Row)
- Publication place: United States
- Media type: Print
- Pages: 303
- ISBN: 0-06-012562-4
- OCLC: 1366086
- Dewey Decimal: 813/.5/4
- LC Class: PZ4.L518 Wi PS3562.E42

The Wind's Twelve Quarters is a collection of short stories by American writer Ursula K. Le Guin, titled after a line from A. E. Housman's A Shropshire Lad and first published by Harper & Row in 1975. A retrospective of Le Guin's short stories, it collects 17 previously published pieces of speculative fiction. Four of these were the germs of novels that she wrote later, and a few others shared connections to her novels. At least four stories are set in the Hainish Universe, and two others in Earthsea. Many stories share themes and motifs, including time and utopia; certain images and characters also recur, including isolated scholars or explorers seeking knowledge in a hostile world.

The Wind's Twelve Quarters won the Locus Award for Best Single Author Collection in 1976. Several stories had won awards upon initial publication. The collection was critically well-received. Several contemporary reviewers wrote that it showcased Le Guin's development as an author, and it highlighted Le Guin's introduction to each story for providing insight into her writing. Scholar Suzanne Reid wrote in 1997 that the stories showcased Le Guin's "wide range of talents and ethical concerns" and praised her comfort with widely-varied settings. Publishers Weekly described it as "First-rate Le Guin", while the Sydney Morning Herald praised Le Guin's "startlingly original approach to the genre" in the collection.

== Contents ==
The Wind's Twelve Quarters was first published in 1975 by Harper & Row, and was republished in standalone editions and omnibus volumes several times. It collects 17 previously published stories. Most appear unchanged from their original publication: "Nine Lives" was published as originally written, and "Winter's King" was considerably rewritten. Literary scholar Barbara Bucknall divides the stories into three approximate categories: early fantasies, "surrealistic" later fantasies described by Le Guin as "psychomyths", and science fiction stories. Le Guin considered four stories to be the germs of novels she was to write later: "The Word of Unbinding" and "The Rule of Names" were Le Guin's first pieces set in Earthsea; "Semley's Necklace" was first published as "Dowry of the Angyar" in 1964 and then as the prologue of the novel Rocannon's World in 1966; and "Winter's King" is about the inhabitants of the planet Winter, as is Le Guin's 1969 novel The Left Hand of Darkness. Several of the other stories are also connected to Le Guin's novels. The protagonist of "The Day Before the Revolution" was an inspiration for the society depicted in The Dispossessed (1974), and the short story is described as a prologue to that novel, though it was written later. Like Le Guin's later novel The Word for World Is Forest, "Vaster than Empires and More Slow" has an immense forest as a setting, and examines the relationship between humans and their natural environment.

The stories are arranged approximately in order of publication, and although they share little direct connection, several share themes and motifs. Four stories are part of the Hainish Cycle, while Bucknall writes that "Nine Lives" could plausibly belong in that loose grouping as well. Three stories — "Winter's King", "Vaster Than Empires and More Slow", and "Semley's Necklace" — touch on the effects of relativistic time dilation. Two others, "April in Paris" and "Darkness Box", also feature time as a prominent theme. Literary scholar Suzanne Reid writes that "The Ones Who Walk Away from Omelas" shares philosophical underpinnings with the utopian experiment depicted in The Dispossessed, while "The Day Before the Revolution" examines the life of Odo, who inspired the society of The Dispossessed. "The Masters" and "The Stars Below" both concern "science as an idea to be cherished" even in the face of authoritarian opposition to it. Literary scholar Charlotte Spivack writes that "The Field of Vision" also contains thematic similarities, in its exploration of science and religion, though it features a futuristic setting. Scholar Elizabeth Cummins links "The Day Before the Revolution" and "The Ones Who Walk Away from Omelas" to "The Field of Vision", writing that they "show Le Guin's continued concern with utopia". The collection as a whole, in Bucknall's view, moves from "tender, romantic" pieces to ones that Le Guin describes as concerning "something stronger, harder and more complex", showcasing a shift from "private concerns to public ones". Literary scholar Susan Wood suggested that the collection shared broad themes, including a "concern with the nature of truth" and the "right way to live". The collection also had recurring images and characters, in Wood's view, including motifs of light and darkness, and isolated characters seeking knowledge in a hostile world.

=== List of stories ===
Title	Time of first publication	First edition publisher/publication	Summary	Citations
"Semley's Necklace"	September 1964	Amazing Stories	The first piece of Hainish Cycle fiction written by Le Guin. Previously published as "The Dowry of Angyar", and used as the prologue of Rocannon's World. The story, inspired by the Norse legend of the Brísingamen, tells of an impoverished bride that journeys off-world to retrieve a precious necklace that once belonged to her family.	
"April in Paris"	September 1962	Fantastic magazine	Le Guin's first professionally published short story. A destitute 15th century French scholar accidentally summons an American professor of the 20th; they begin a friendship, and summon two other people, women from the past and far future.	
"The Masters"	February 1963	Fantastic magazine	Le Guin's first published science fiction story. In a dystopian future, the use of science is greatly limited, and Arabic numerals are considered black magic. Two mechanics covertly study mathematics, and are punished when discovered.	
"Darkness Box"	November 1963	Fantastic magazine	"Darkness Box" is a fantasy: a king who wishes to end the conflict between his sons stops time by trapping darkness in a box and flinging it into the ocean.	
"The Word of Unbinding"	January 1964	Fantastic magazine	Le Guin's first story set in Earthsea: a wizard attempts to escape from an enemy who has returned from the dead.	
"The Rule of Names"	April 1964	Fantastic magazine	A light-hearted story and the second set in Earthsea. A wizard named Blackbeard attacks Mr. Underhill, a seemingly inefficient wizard, thinking to overpower him with his true name.	
"Winter's King"	1969	Orbit 5, edited by Damon Knight.	Set on the same world as The Left Hand of Darkness, the story follows the king of the nation of Karhide, who returns to his society after extended space travel having barely aged in the interim. Originally published using male pronouns for its dual-sexed characters, it was reworked to use female pronouns while retaining male titles in this publication.	
"The Good Trip"	August 1970	Fantastic magazine	This story is a fantasy with a realistic setting; a young man whose wife has mental health troubles takes LSD with his friends, and has a vision in which he is finally able to connect with his wife.	
"Nine Lives"	November 1969	Playboy	"Nine Lives" is a science fiction story, in which a group of human clones join a two-person exploratory party on a remote planet.	
"Things"	1970	Orbit 6, edited by Damon Knight	In a society that believes it must prepare for its end, a brickmaker decides to build a causeway into the sea. This story was described as a "psychomyth" by commentators.	
"A Trip to the Head"	1970	Quark/1, edited by Samuel R. Delany and Marilyn Hacker	Two people and a fawn approach a forest in which names do not exist. Also described as a "psychomyth", this story contains many references to Lewis Carroll's Through the Looking Glass.	
"Vaster than Empires and More Slow"	1971	New Dimensions 1, edited by Robert Silverberg.	This piece follows an exploratory ship sent to a newly discovered planet, named World 4470. The crew includes Osden, an "empath" able to feel others' emotions. The crew finds a world covered in forests and apparently devoid of animal life, but eventually begins to feel a fear emanating from the planet.	
"The Stars Below"	1974	Orbit 14, edited by Damon Knight	The protagonist of this story is an astronomer whose instruments are burned on the church's orders. He escapes into a silver mine, where he befriends the miners.	
"The Field of Vision"	October 1973	Galaxy Science Fiction, vol. 34	This story tells of a spaceship returning from a planet where the astronauts were converted to religious beliefs against their better judgement; now one is blind because he only sees God, while the other is deaf because he only hears God.	
"Direction of the Road"	1973	Orbit 12, edited by Damon Knight	This story is a fantasy written from the perspective of a conscious tree as it stands beside a road. Le Guin acknowledged that it was inspired by a tree in the real world.	
"The Ones Who Walk Away from Omelas"	1973	New Dimensions III, edited by Robert Silverberg	This piece describes a town whose citizens are universally happy, but whose happiness depends on a single child being in perpetual torment. Le Guin wrote that the story was inspired by a passage from the philosopher William James.	
"The Day Before the Revolution"	August 1974	Galaxy Science Fiction	Described by Le Guin as being about "one of the ones who walked away from Omelas", this story tells of Odo, an aging revolutionary, on the day before an uprising that she helped inspire takes place.	

== Reception ==
The Wind's Twelve Quarters was positively received by critics, though, according to Spivack, reviewers were generally less favorable toward Le Guin's short stories than her novels. A reviewer in the Atlantic Monthly wrote that Le Guin was the "ideal science fiction writer for readers who ordinarily dislike science fiction", which Spivack attributes to Le Guin's exploration of the "ideas and psychological implications" of science rather than its technological aspects. The Sydney Morning Herald similarly praised Le Guin's "startlingly original approach to the genre" in the collection. A review in The New Republic found the science fiction stories, and particularly those exploring plausibly scientific possibilities, most effective. A review in Publishers Weekly praised the collection as "First-rate Le Guin", describing it as a "retrospective" of the a decade of Le Guin's writing and a demonstration of her "special talent" for speculative fiction. Susan Wood wrote that the collection was a good showcase of Le Guin's "rapid development as a writer" in the period following the publication of her first stories, and that the collection was essential to understanding Le Guin. The Salt Lake Tribune called the book a "collection of excellence only a handful of writers can match". Multiple reviews called attention to the author's notes that preceded each story, with the Sydney Morning Herald saying they "[threw] some light on the workings of one of the most original minds in the genre". Reid wrote in 1997 that the stories showcased Le Guin's "wide range of talents and ethical concerns" and praising her comfort with widely varied settings. A review in the St. Louis Post-Dispatch said that the collection "certainly stands on its own", and praised Le Guin's characterization in particular.

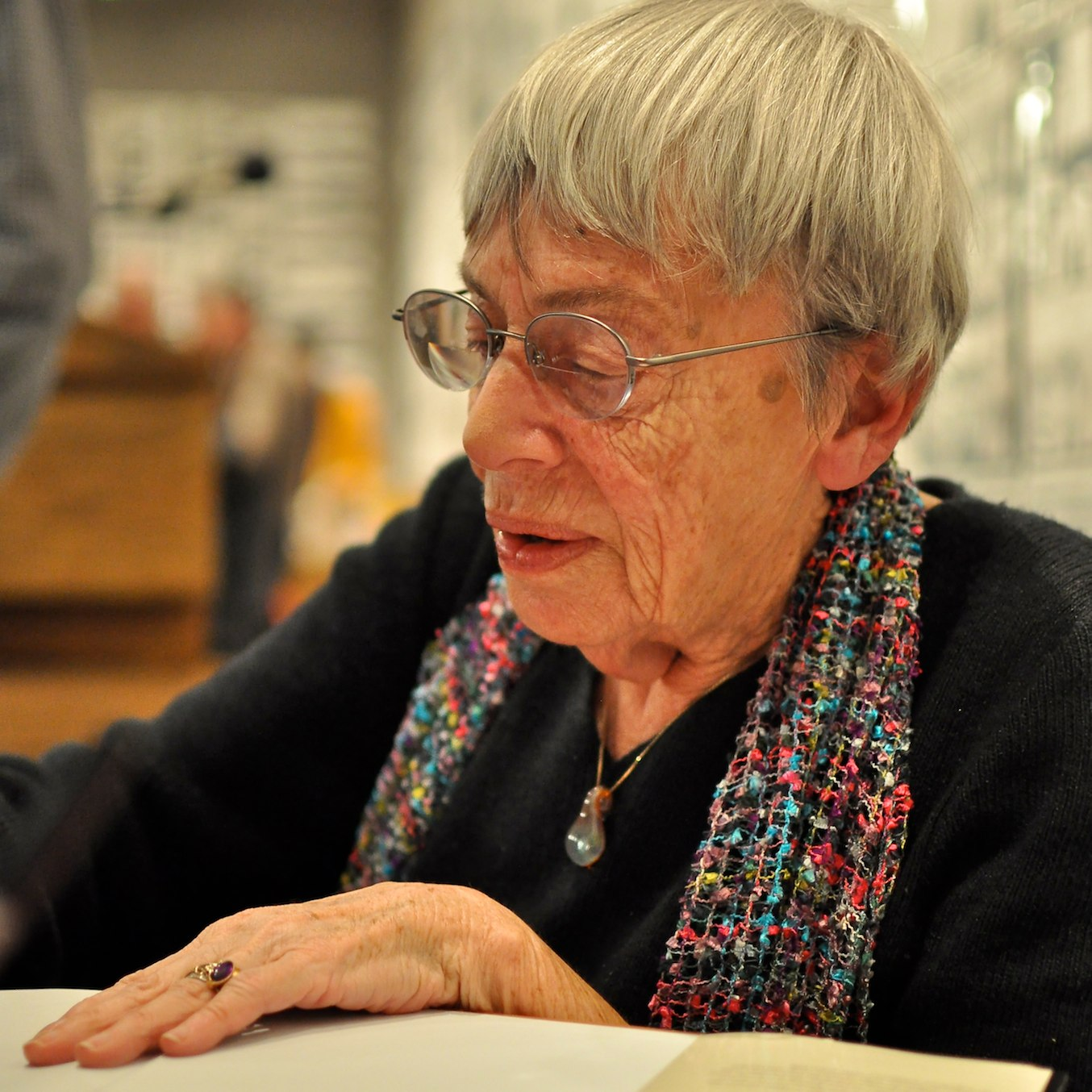
Author Ursula K. Le Guin signing a book in 2013

Commentators favorably highlighted a variety of individual stories. Wood called particular attention to "Nine Lives", "Winter's King", and "Vaster Than Empires and More Slow", writing that in each, scientific extrapolation was used as a "framework for powerful psychological studies". Reid, writing in 1997, also highlighted "Vaster Than Empires and More Slow", calling it a "Le Guin classic", as well as "April in Paris", praising Le Guin's use of her knowledge of medieval French culture. Literary scholar Charlotte Spivack had similar praise for "April in Paris", describing it as a "delightful "time" fantasy". She also praised "The Stars Below" as an "excellent science fiction story", and compared it favorably to the thematically similar "The Masters". Publishers Weekly highlighted the stories "April in Paris", "Nine Lives", and "The Ones Who Walk from Omelas" (sic), while the Salt Lake Tribune reserved particular praise for "Winter's King" and "Semley's Necklace". In a 2020 retrospective of the collection in Tor, Sean Guynes wrote that the four "germinative" stories that grew into novels were of interest largely because they hinted at Le Guin's later explorations, but considered "Semley's Necklace" "beautifully written" and "The Rule of Names" amusing. In contrast, the Toronto Star had particular praise for "Winter's King". Guynes also praised "April in Paris" and "The Good Trip", finding the other stories in the first half of the collection average. The rest of the volume, in contrast, received strong praise: Guynes wrote that they were "heady, beautiful, and thought-provoking", written with a "careful, sometimes quiet, power". Guynes concluded that the collection as a whole was "multifaceted, intellectually rich, and artistically transformative". Guynes noted that many individual stories in the collection were among Le Guin's most famous, including in particular "The Ones Who Walk Away from Omelas" and "The Day Before the Revolution". Scholar Donna White noted that those two stories, along with "Nine Lives" are among Le Guin's most-anthologized stories.

=== Awards and honors ===
The Wind's Twelve Quarters won the Locus Award for best single author collection in 1976. Science fiction editor and critic David G. Hartwell included it with 23 others on his list of the best short-story collections of the 1970s. Two of the stories in the volume won awards when first published. "The Ones Who Walk Away from Omelas" was nominated for the Locus Award for Best Short Fiction and won the Hugo Award for Best Short Story in 1974, while "The Day Before the Revolution" won the Nebula Award for Best Short Story, the Locus Award for best short story, and the Jupiter Award for short stories, all in 1975. It was also nominated for the 1975 Hugo Award for Best Short Story. Additionally, "Winter's King" was nominated for the Hugo Award for Best Short Story in 1970, and "Vaster than Empires and More Slow" was nominated for the same award in 1972, and came 14th in a poll for the Locus Award for Best Short Story, while "Nine Lives" was nominated for the Nebula Award for Best Short Story in 1970. "Vaster than Empires and More Slow", "The Field of Vision", and "The Stars Below" were all nominees for the Locus Award, in 1972, 1974, and 1975 respectively.

== See also ==
- Classical compass winds – the phrase refers to the Classical 12-point wind rose, not the later mariners' rose of 8, 16, or 32
