= Buffalo Gals and Other Animal Presences =

- First edition Capra Press cover
- Author: Ursula K. Le Guin
- Language: English
- Genre: Fantasy, science fiction, poetry
- Publisher: Capra Press
- Publication date: 1987
- Publication place: United States
- Media type: Print
- Pages: 196
- ISBN: 0-88496-270-9
- OCLC: 15628232
- Dewey Decimal: 813/.54
- LC Class: PS3562.E42 B8 1987

Buffalo Gals and Other Animal Presences is a collection of short stories and poems by American writer Ursula K. Le Guin, first published in 1987 by Capra Press. It includes the author's introductions to the pieces in each section of the collection. The book has a theme of works about "animal, vegetable, or mineral."

It was reviewed in Locus, Foundation, and Analog Science Fiction and Fact.

== Contents ==
- Introduction
- "Come Into Animal Presences" by Denise Levertov (1961)
- I. "Buffalo Gals, Won't You Come Out Tonight" (1987, The Magazine of Fantasy and Science Fiction)
- II. Three Rock Poems
  - "The Basalt" (1982, Open Places 33)
  - "Flints"
  - "Mt. St. Helens/Omphalos" (1975, Wild Angels)
- III. "The Wife's Story" and "Mazes"
  - "Mazes" (1975, Epoch)
  - "The Wife's Story" (1982, The Compass Rose)
- IV. Five Vegetable Poems
  - "Torrey Pines Reserve" (1981, Hard Words)
  - "Lewis and Clark and After" (1987, The Seattle Review)
  - "West Texas"
  - "Xmas Over" (1984, Clinton Street Quarterly)
  - The Crown of Laurel"
- V. "The Direction of the Road" and "Vaster Than Empires"
  - "The Direction of the Road" (1974, Orbit 14)
  - "Vaster Than Empires and More Slow" (1971, New Dimensions 1)
- VI. Seven Bird and Beast Poems
  - "What is Going on in the Oaks"
  - "For Ted" (1975, Wild Angels)
  - "Found Poem"
  - "Totem" (1981, Hard Words)
  - "Winter Downs" (1981, Hard Words)
  - "The Man Eater"
  - "Sleeping Out"
- VII. "The White Donkey" and "Horse Camp"
  - "The White Donkey" (1980, TriQuarterly)
  - "Horse Camp" (1986, The New Yorker)
- VIII. Four Cat Poems
  - "Tabby Lorenzo"
  - "Black Leonard in Negative Space"
  - "A Conversation With a Silence"
  - "For Leonard, Darko, and Burton Watson"
- IX. "Schrödinger's Cat" and "The Author of the Acacia Seeds"
  - "Schrödinger's Cat" (1974, Universe 5)
  - "The Author of the Acacia Seeds and Other Extracts from the Journal of Therolinguistics" (1974, Fellowship of the Stars)
- X."May's Lion"
  - "May's Lion" (1983, The Little Magazine, Volume 14)
- XI. Rilke's "Eighth Duino Elegy" and "She Unnames Them"
  - "The Eighth Elegy" (translation by Ursula K. Le Guin, from the Duino Elegies by Rainer Maria Rilke)
  - "She Unnames Them" (1985, The New Yorker)
