= Doris P. Buck =

American science fiction author

Doris Pitkin Buck
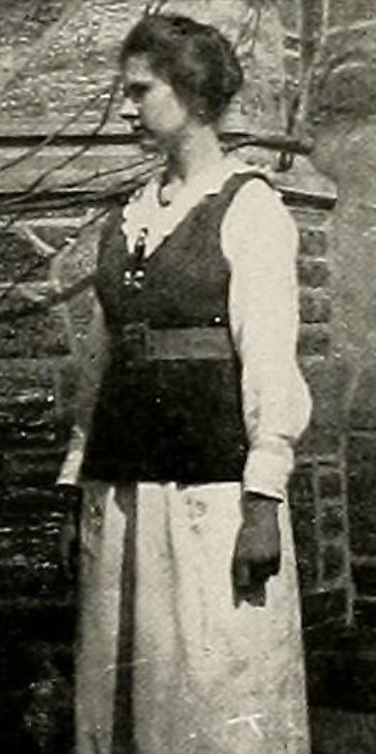
- Doris Ellen Pitkin, from the 1920 yearbook of Bryn Mawr College
- Born: Doris Ellen Pitkin; January 3, 1898; New York City
- Died: December 4, 1980 (aged 82)
- Education: Bryn Mawr College; Columbia University
- Occupations: Writer, actress, educator

Doris Pitkin Buck (January 3, 1898 – December 4, 1980) was an American science fiction author.

Born in New York City, she graduated from Bryn Mawr College in 1920 and Columbia University with a master's degree in 1925. She was a stage actress before marrying architect, Richard Sutton Buck Jr. She taught English at Ohio State University and was a founding member of the Science Fiction Writers of America.

She published numerous science fiction stories and poems, many of them in The Magazine of Fantasy & Science Fiction. Buck started published at fifty-four with her first story, "Aunt Agatha" in the October 1952 Magazine of Fantasy and Science Fiction. Her story "The Little Blue Weeds of Spring" from the June 1966 issue was a nominee on the first ballot for the Nebula Award for Best Short Story. Her story "Why They Mobbed the White House" appeared in Damon Knight's anthology Orbit 3 (1968). Her story "The Giberel" appeared in Robert Silverberg's anthology New Dimensions 1 (1971) and reappeared in Lloyd Biggle, Jr.'s Nebula Award Stories 7 (1972). Her story "Cacophony in Pink and Ochre" is one of the stories slated to appear in Harlan Ellison's unpublished anthology The Last Dangerous Visions.

Buck died at age 82 of a pulmonary embolism. Her final publication was the poem "Travel Tip", published posthumously in the June 1981 issue of F&SF.
