= Dickran Palulian =

American artist

Dickran Palulian (born 1938) is an American illustrator and photographer who has produced work for Sports Illustrated, including their "Silver Anniversary" issue in 1979. Among his many notable accomplishments are taking the picture of Mary Lou Retton that was used on the Wheaties box after she won several gold medals at the 1984 Summer Olympics.

== Early life ==
Palulian grew up in Detroit, Michigan.

== Career ==
Palulian started as a commercial studio photographer in Detroit. He then moved to New York, where he won freelance assignments with several leading magazines.

== Selected works ==
- What Entropy Means to me (cover illust.) Doubleday, 1972. ISBN 0-385-06831-X
- New Dimensions II (cover illust.) Doubleday, 1972. ISBN 0-385-09141-9
- Omni, October 1982 (cover illust.) Omni Publications International Ltd.
- The Cuisine of Armenia (illust.) Hippocrene Books, 1998. ISBN 0-7818-0695-X
- Byrne's Complete Book of Pool Shots: 350 Moves Every Player Should Know (illust.) Harvest Books, 2003. ISBN 0-15-602721-6
- Airbrush: The Complete Studio Handbook (illust.) Watson-Guptill Publications; Reprint edition, 1997. ISBN 0-8230-0169-5
- Artists as Illustrators (illust.) Scarecrow Press, 1989. ISBN 0-8108-2168-0
