= Earthsea =

Fantasy fiction series (1968–2001) by Ursula K. Le Guin

- Cover of The Books of Earthsea: The Complete Illustrated Edition, with art by Charles Vess.
- A Wizard of Earthsea (1968); The Tombs of Atuan (1971); The Farthest Shore (1973); Tehanu (1990); Tales from Earthsea (2001; collection); The Other Wind (2001)
- Author: Ursula K. Le Guin
- Illustrator: Pauline Ellison; Ruth Robbins; Anne Yvonne Gilbert; Gail Garraty; Margaret Chodos-Irvine; Kelly Nelson; Marion Wood Kolisch; Charles Vess; Cliff Nielsen
- Country: United States
- Genre: Fantasy, young adult fiction (first three books)
- Publisher: Parnassus Press, Atheneum Books, Harcourt, Saga Press (US)
- Published: 1964–2018 (novels, 1968–2001)
- Media type: Print (hardcover and paperback), audiobook

The Earthsea Cycle, also known as Earthsea, is a series of high fantasy books written by American author Ursula K. Le Guin. Beginning with A Wizard of Earthsea (1968), The Tombs of Atuan (1970), and The Farthest Shore (1972), the series was continued in Tehanu (1990), and Tales from Earthsea and The Other Wind (both 2001). In 2018, all the novels and short stories were published in a single volume, The Books of Earthsea: The Complete Illustrated Edition, with artwork by Charles Vess.

== Setting ==
=== Geography and climate ===
The world of Earthsea is one of sea and islands: a vast archipelago of hundreds of islands surrounded by mostly uncharted ocean. Earthsea contains no large continents. The largest island, Havnor, at approximately 380 miles (610 km) across, is about the size of Great Britain. The overall climate of Earthsea is temperate, comparable to the mid-latitudes of the northern hemisphere of Earth. There is a yearly transition from warm summers to cold and snowy winters, especially on northern islands like Gont and Osskil. In the southern regions of Earthsea, it can be much warmer.

=== People and cultures ===
The cultures of Earthsea are not direct analogues of those of the real world, but are literate non-industrial civilizations.

Technologically, Earthsea is an early Iron Age society, with bronze used in places where iron is scarce. Ged's father is a bronze-smith. Weapons also include the use of wood and other hard but easily crafted metals.

Most of the people of Earthsea have brown skin. In the Archipelago, "red-brown" skin is typical; however, the people of the East Reach have darker "black-brown" complexions. The people of Osskil in the north are described as having lighter, sallow complexions, while the Kargs of the Kargad Lands are "white-skinned" and often "yellow-haired". Le Guin has criticized what she described as the general assumption in fantasy that characters should be white and the society should resemble the European Middle Ages.

=== Cosmology ===
Magic is a central part of life in most of Earthsea; the exception being the Kargish lands, where it is forbidden. There are weather workers on ships, fixers who repair boats and buildings, entertainers, and court sorcerers. Magic is an inborn talent which can be refined with training. The most gifted are sent to the school on Roke, where, if their skill and discipline prove sufficient, they can become staff-carrying wizards.

The Dry Land is where most people go after they die, with the exception of the Kargs. It is a realm of shadow and dust, of eternal night where the stars are fixed in the sky, and nothing changes. The souls who reside there have an empty, dreary existence, and even "lovers pass each other in silence". Le Guin stated that the idea of the Dry Land came from the "Greco-Roman idea of Hades' realm, from certain images in Dante Alighieri's work, and from one of Rainer Maria Rilke's [Duino] Elegies". In the fifth and last novel of the series, The Other Wind, it is revealed that the Dry Land is a part of the dragons' domain that was stolen from them by the earliest mages in an attempt gone awry to obtain immortality. The Dry Land is restored to the dragons at the end of The Other Wind.

=== Taoist philosophy ===
Yin-Yang symbol of balanced opposites. In Le Guin's words, "Light is the left hand of darkness; darkness is the right hand of light."

Literary scholar Richard Erlich writes that the Earthsea books embody Taoist philosophy, with Tehanu counterbalancing the initial trilogy. In Tehanu, Ged returns to Gont, completing the cycle of his quest: Erlich comments that this movement back to his roots is Taoist. The balancing of "polarities" such as light and dark, male and female, doing and being is central to the philosophy and to the novels. The Yin-Yang symbol reflects this, and Erlich analyzes multiple occurrences of Yin-Yang in the series, commenting that "Yin-Yang, indeed, is a unifying symbol in the trilogy".

Richard Erlich's analysis of Taoist-style balancing of Yin-Yang opposites in Earthsea
Instance	Opposites		Location
"Only in silence the word"	silence	word	Epigraph at start of A Wizard of Earthsea and of Tehanu
"Only in dark the light"	dark	light	Epigraph at start of A Wizard of Earthsea and of Tehanu
"Only in dying life"	death	life	Epigraph at start of A Wizard of Earthsea and of Tehanu
White scars on Ged's dark face	dark skin	white scars	A Wizard of Earthsea
Ged merges with his shadow	shadow	hero	A Wizard of Earthsea
(Initially hostile) Tenar bonds with Ged	dark-skinned Ged	white-skinned Tenar	Tombs of Atuan
scarred Therru is a dragon	burned Therru	dragon-person Tehanu	Tehanu

Erlich also writes that the three books of the initial trilogy each embody a Taoist balance that needs restoring, a needed integration, and a doorway that must be closed.

== Series ==
=== Books ===
Book	Year	Publisher
A Wizard of Earthsea	1968	Parnassus
The Tombs of Atuan	1971 (Note: The Tombs of Atuan previously appeared in the Winter 1970 issue of Worlds of Fantasy with illustrations and the magazine cover picture by Jack Gaughan.)	Atheneum
The Farthest Shore	1972	Atheneum
Tehanu	1990	Atheneum
Tales from Earthsea	2001	Harcourt
The Other Wind	2001	Harcourt

Le Guin originally intended for A Wizard of Earthsea to be a standalone novel, but she wrote The Tombs of Atuan as a sequel after considering the loose ends in the first book; The Farthest Shore followed after further consideration. These three books were written in quick succession, from 1968 to 1972, and are sometimes seen as the "original trilogy". Nearly twenty years later, Le Guin wrote a fourth book, Tehanu (1990), and followed it with Tales from Earthsea and The Other Wind in 2001. The latter three books are sometimes referred to as the "second trilogy". The series as a whole is known as the Earthsea Cycle, and was published in a single volume in 2018 as The Books of Earthsea: The Complete Illustrated Edition, with art by Charles Vess.

=== Short stories ===
Le Guin published nine short stories of Earthsea. Seven appear in two collections of her work (and some have been reissued elsewhere). Two early stories were originally published in 1964, and were collected in The Wind's Twelve Quarters (1975). These helped to define the setting of Earthsea. Five much later stories were collected in Tales from Earthsea (2001), where three were original. In October 2014, a new novella set in Earthsea was published as a stand-alone, "The Daughter of Odren". A final 12-page short story, "Firelight", was published in June 2018, covering the last days of Ged.

Tales from Earthsea includes some 30 pages of fictional reference material titled "A Description of Earthsea" (2001).

- "The Word of Unbinding", Fantastic Stories of Imagination, January 1964 ^{+Q}
- "The Rule of Names", Fantastic Stories of Imagination, April 1964^{+Q}
- "Dragonfly", Legends: Short Novels by the Masters of Modern Fantasy, Tor Books, 1998 ^{+T}
- "Darkrose and Diamond", The Magazine of Fantasy & Science Fiction, Oct-Nov 1999 ^{+T}
- "The Bones of the Earth" (2001) ^{T}
- "The Finder" (2001) ^{T}
- "On The High Marsh" (2001) ^{T}
- "The Daughter of Odren" (2014) ^{EB}
- "Firelight", Paris Review, Summer 2018, issue 225

Key:
^{+Q} Collected in The Wind's Twelve Quarters
^{+T} Collected in Tales from Earthsea
^{T} Original to Tales from Earthsea
^{EB} Originally released as a stand-alone eBook

=== Unsubmitted story ===
After "The Rule of Names" and before "A Wizard of Earthsea", Le Guin wrote a long story about a prince in search of the Ultimate. He travels south-west from Havnor through the archipelago into the open sea. There he finds a raft-colony and sea-people, whom he joins in the sea. The prince wears out, sinks and finds the Ultimate. This story was never submitted for publication because "it never worked out itself well". However, the theme of a raft-colony and sea-people was later taken up as an important ingredient in the plot of The Farthest Shore.

== Awards ==
Each book in the series has received a literary award:

Book	Awards
A Wizard of Earthsea	Boston Globe-Horn Book Award (1969); Lewis Carroll Shelf Award (1979)
The Tombs of Atuan	Newbery Honor (1972)
The Farthest Shore	National Book Award for Children's Books (1973)
Tehanu	Nebula Award for Best Novel (1990); Locus Award for Best Fantasy Novel (1991)
Tales from Earthsea	Locus Award for Best Collection (2002)
The Other Wind	World Fantasy Award for Best Novel (2002)

On November 5, 2019, the BBC News listed The Earthsea Trilogy on its list of the 100 most influential novels.

== Influences ==
The Earthsea series, from 1968, was one of the first fantasy series influenced by J. R. R. Tolkien. Among the Tolkienian archetypes in the Earthsea books are wizards (including the protagonist, Ged), a magical ring (the ring of Erreth-Akbe in The Tombs of Atuan), a Middle-earth style quest (in The Farthest Shore), and powerful dragons (like the dragon of Pendor, in A Wizard of Earthsea).

The Tolkien scholar John Garth writes that Tolkien's name appears to be hidden in the small amount of the Hardic language of Earthsea in The Wizard of Earthsea. "Foam" is sukien, from suk, "feather", and inien, "sea". "Rock", the material of earth, is "tolk", so, he suggests, the Hardic for "Earthsea" would be Tolkien, for tolk + inien on the same pattern as sukien. Garth suggests that this is a tribute to Tolkien, tolk being the first word of the "Old Speech" that she names, and the first to be handed down both by the Wizard Ged to Tenar in The Tombs of Atuan, and by Tenar to her daughter in Tehanu. Garth's post is pre-dated by similar speculation by the American author Keith Miller who wrote on the topic shortly after attending a talk by Le Guin in which she spoke of her love of Tolkien's work.

== Adaptations ==
=== Audiobooks ===
Audiobook readings have been made by different narrators and publishers. In the early 1990s, Robert Inglis narrated the first three books of the series for Recorded Books.

=== Radio ===
The BBC produced a two-hour radio dramatization of A Wizard of Earthsea, first broadcast on Radio 4 in December 1996. It was narrated by Judi Dench, with Michael Maloney as Ged, and used actors with different accents to emphasize the origins of the Earthsea characters (for instance, Estarriol and others from the East Reach were played by actors with Southern Welsh accents).

In April and May 2015, BBC Radio 4 aired a new, six-part dramatization of the Earthsea works, encompassing the storylines and motifs of the novels A Wizard of Earthsea, The Tombs of Atuan and The Farthest Shore. The first of the six 30 minute-long episodes premiered on April 27 and the last on May 5. The characters of Ged and Tenar were portrayed by three actors at different stages in their lives (Kasper Hilton-Hille, James McArdle and Shaun Dooley as Ged; Nishi Malde, Aysha Kala and Vineeta Rishi as Tenar). The radio drama was adapted by Judith Adams, directed by Sasha Yevtushenko and featured original music composed by Jon Nicholls. Following the premiere radio broadcast, each of the episodes were made available for online streaming on BBC Radio 4 Extra for a month, via the BBC iPlayer service. The adaptation was created and aired as part of a thematic month centered on the life and works of Ursula Le Guin, in commemoration of her then-recent 85th birthday. In addition to the Earthsea radio drama, the thematic month included the airing of a two-part radio adaptation of The Left Hand of Darkness earlier in April, as well as exclusive interviews with Le Guin and some of the writers she inspired.

=== Television ===
In May 2018, the series was optioned for film adaptation by producer Jennifer Fox. In 2019, it was decided to produce a television series instead.

==== Miniseries, 2004 ====
In December 2004, the U.S.-based Sci Fi Channel broadcast a loose three-hour adaptation of A Wizard of Earthsea and The Tombs of Atuan for television, entitled Legend of Earthsea (later, simply Earthsea). It was broadcast in two parts on Channel 4 in the UK at Easter 2005. Sci Fi Channel had angered Le Guin and fans of the Earthsea novels with its announcement that Ged and the vast majority of the other characters would be played by Caucasians and with the dramatis personæ posted on an official website. Referring to the writers of the show, Le Guin said "I have blasted them for whitewashing Earthsea, and do not forgive them for it."

One month before the U.S. broadcast, Le Guin posted on her website "A Reply to Some Statements Made by the Film-Makers" published in the December 2004 issue of Sci Fi Magazine. She opened with the observation, "I've tried very hard to keep from saying anything at all about this production, being well aware that movies must differ in many ways from the books they're based on, and feeling that I really had no business talking about it, since I was not included in planning it and was given no part in discussions or decisions." (Director Robert Lieberman, too, had stated that she was not involved.)

"That makes it particularly galling of the director to put words in my mouth." Le Guin disavowed some specific interpretations both by Lieberman and by executive director Robert Halmi Sr., and concluded (quoting Lieberman):

I wonder if the people who made the film of The Lord of the Rings had ended it with Frodo putting on the Ring and ruling happily ever after, and then claimed that that was what Tolkien "intended ..."[,] would people think they'd been "very, very honest to the books"?

=== Animated film, 2006 ===
Studio Ghibli's 2006 film Tales from Earthsea is loosely based in the Earthsea mythology. It was directed by Gorō Miyazaki, the son of Hayao Miyazaki. Le Guin granted Studio Ghibli the rights due to her love of Hayao Miyazaki's films. Le Guin called the adaptation "disappointing" and "entirely different" from her creation.
