= Space War Blues =

1978 science fiction novel by Richard A. Lupoff

First edition (publ. Dell Books) Cover art by George Barr

Space War Blues is a science fiction novel by American writer Richard A. Lupoff. It is a fixup of several previously published pieces, the longest of which, "With the Bentfin Boomer Boys on Little Old New Alabama" (hereinafter “WTBBB”), first appeared in Harlan Ellison's 1972 anthology Again, Dangerous Visions. In his introduction to the novella, Ellison wrote: "It is so audacious and extravagant a story that it becomes one of the three or four really indispensable reasons for doing this book. Frankly, had no other story than this one been written for A,DV—the book would be worth reading." The story appeared on the final Nebula Award ballot for Best Novella of the Year.

== History ==
Lupoff wrote the book over a period of almost eleven years. He began writing “WTBBB” in 1967, submitting the first three chapters of the 36,000-word novella to Harlan Ellison. With Ellison's encouragement, Lupoff expanded it to the 38,000-word version he turned in to Ellison in February 1969. Henry Morrison, Lupoff's agent, submitted this version to Dell, which became interested in publishing “WTBBB” as a possible stand-alone “slim” novel. Lupoff's contract with Ellison prohibited any prior appearance of stories slated for Again, Dangerous Visions, and along with the delay in ADV's publication, the deal with Dell fell through.

In 1973, Lupoff wrote a pair of stories which, while directly related to each other, were tangential to the main storyline of "WTBBB". These stories, "After the Dreamtime" and "Sail the Tide of Mourning", were published in the fourth and fifth volumes of Robert Silverberg’s original anthology series New Dimensions. Both stories were on the final Hugo Award ballot of their respective years, and "Sail the Tide of Mourning" was on the 1975 Nebula Awards ballot. Another story, "The Bentfin Boomer Girl Comes Thru", closer in style to "WTBBB", was published by editor Ted White in Amazing Stories magazine. These pieces are intertwined throughout the novel (see Contents below for a chapter-by-chapter breakdown.) After a succession of editors at Dell, a 70,000-word version of the novel was finally published in paperback in June 1978, with a hardcover reprint two years later by Gregg Press, aimed primarily at libraries.

According to the author's preface in the first edition, Lupoff was open to changes in the book's content and title (first New Alabama Blues, then New Alabama Spacewar Blues, and finally Space War Blues, when the cover designer complained that the title was too long.) A manuscript reader for Dell described the book as "unutterable bilge" and claimed the only intelligible part was a little prefatory note by an imaginary "Uncle Dudley." When Jim Frenkel, the last of the four Dell editors who worked with the novel, asked Lupoff to remove the "Uncle Dudley" sections, he readily agreed.

Frenkel wrote about the novel's style in his introduction to the hardcover reprint: "there are no fixed rules of grammar, spelling, or punctuation in the book, save for the unwritten rule that the inconsistency in all of the above is recognizably different and consistent within each narrative thread” The thread with the greatest divergence from standard English is the “WTBBB” sections. For example:

’nifykin look outha portole sreely pretty, sreely pretty, lookna Port Upotoi swinging roun thole mudball, thole goodole place, it’s maybe not the prettiest place na whole universe but nobody ever said it was, it was home though m that counted frole lot that swat Leander Laptip saw outha portole:

These divergences are apparently an attempt to represent (orthographically) vernacular English of the southern states of the US.

== Publishing history ==
- Dell (ISBN 0-440-16292-0), June 1978, paperback (cover by George Barr)
- Gregg Press (ISBN 0-8398-2596-X), May 1980, hardcover, photographic reprint of the first edition (includes a new introduction by James R. Frenkel, editor of the first edition)

Publication of the various sections:

- "With the Bentfin Boomer Boys On Little Old New Alabama" (written 1967-1969) (originally published in Again, Dangerous Visions, ed. Harlan Ellison, Doubleday, 1972)
- "After the Dreamtime" (written 1973) (originally published in New Dimensions IV, ed. Robert Silverberg, Signet, 1974)
- "Sail the Tide of Mourning" (written 1973) (originally published in New Dimensions 5, ed. Robert Silverberg, Harper & Row, 1975)
- "The Bentfin Boomer Girl Comes Thru" (written 1974) (originally published in Amazing Stories, ed. Ted White, March 1977)

Note: Chapter 10 (“Our Own Little Mardi Gras”) was previewed in Heavy Metal, August 1977.

== Contents ==
- "Sailing the Dark with the Bentfin Boomer Bappa Zappa Kid" (introduction by Harlan Ellison)
- "And I Awoke — Was This Some Kind of Joke?" (preface by Richard A. Lupoff)
- Chapter 1. By His Own Speech (First part of “After the Dreamtime”)
- Chapter 2. Beneath the Pelican Banner (New material)
- Chapter 3. Call It Yurakosi (New material)
- Chapter 4. Disappearing in Other Parts (Second part of “After the Dreamtime”)
- Chapter 5. At Elmina Castle (New material)
- Chapter 6. Last Night at Letohatchie (First part of Chapter 1 of “WTBBB”)
- Chapter 7. Empty Places on Both Sides (Third part of “After the Dreamtime”)
- Chapter 8. On the Ground (Final part of “After the Dreamtime”)
- Chapter 9. Up Crikkingwood Stairs (Second part of Chapter 1 of “WTBBB”)
- Chapter 10. Our Own Little Mardi Gras (First part was new material, second part was the final part of Chapter 1 of “WTBBB”)
- Chapter 11. From the Bizonton Pylon (Chapter 2 of “WTBBB”)
- Chapter 12. The Bright Side of N’Yu-Atlanchi (Chapter 3 of “WTBBB”)
- Chapter 13. Aboard the Starship Theodore Bilbo (Chapter 4 of “WTBBB”)
- Chapter 14. Into the Exoneurobiology Section (Chapter 5 of “WTBBB”)
- Chapter 15. Into the Great Hall (Chapter 6 of “WTBBB”)
- Chapter 16. To the Nation We Know (First part of Chapter 7 of “WTBBB”; the “Uncle Dudley” part was removed)
- Chapter 17. With the Mourning Tide (First part of “Sail the Tide of Mourning”)
- Chapter 18. Aboard the Starship Jimmie-O (Chapter 8 of “WTBBB”)
- Chapter 19. Aboard the Starship Oginga Odinga (Chapter 9 of “WTBBB”)
- Chapter 20. Home from the Stars (Chapter 1 of “The Bentfin Boomer Girl Comes Thru”)
- Chapter 21. At the Gran Houmfort Nationale (Chapter 10 of “WTBBB”)
- Chapter 22. Artists in Their Studio (Chapter 2 of “The Bentfin Boomer Girl Comes Thru”)
- Chapter 23. Across the Cislunar Vacuum (Chapter 11 of “WTBBB”; the “Uncle Dudley” part was removed)
- Chapter 24. Celebrities in the Streets (Chapter 3 of “The Bentfin Boomer Girl Comes Thru”)
- Chapter 25. A Distant Pearl-Tinted Horizon (Chapter 12 of “WTBBB”)
- Chapter 26. The Lower Half of Hir Face (Chapter 13 of “WTBBB”)
- Chapter 27. His Sweetheart's Loving Arms (Chapter 14 of “WTBBB”)
- Chapter 28. Each on the Cheek (Final part of “Sail the Tide of Mourning”)

The narrative voice of the chapters formed from “After the Dreamtime” was changed from first person to third
