= Nine Lives (novelette) =

- Short story by Ursula K. Le Guin
- Country: United States
- Language: English
- Genre: Science fiction

Publication
- Published in: Playboy
- Publication type: Magazine
- Media type: Print
- Publication date: November 1969

"Nine Lives" is a 1968 science fiction novelette by American writer Ursula K. Le Guin. Originally published in Playboy magazine and reprinted in Le Guin's compilation The Wind's Twelve Quarters, the story uses human cloning to explore perceptions of self and other.

When it was published, Le Guin opted for publishing it under her initials (U.K. Le Guin) rather than her name, following Playboy's suggestion that a female author would make its readers "nervous". Le Guin said:

It's not surprising that Playboy hadn't had its consciousness raised back then, but it is surprising to me to realize how thoughtlessly I went along with them. It was the first (and is the only) time I met with anything I understood as sexual prejudice, prejudice against me as a woman writer, from any editor or publisher; and it seemed so silly, so grotesque, that I failed to see that it was also important.

A portion of the two-page title spread for Nine Lives in the November 1969 Playboy Magazine. Playboy editors felt that a story by a woman author would make their readers "nervous" - and so pressured Le Guin to write under the pseudonym U. K. Le Guin. This is the only time Le Guin ever wrote under a different or pseudonymous name, and she was later sorry that she did. Le Guin was one of the few female authors who wrote for Playboy in the 1960s.

Playboy's Playbill for November 1969 - introducing the authors and articles in the issue - does not include a photo of Le Guin, as it does for most male authors in the issue. The paragraph about Le Guin in Playbill reads:

Our third story, Nine Lives, marks the PLAYBOY debut of science-fictioneer U. K. Le Guin, who cryptically tells us: "It is commonly suspected that the writings of U. K. Le Guin are not actually written by U. K. Le Guin but by another person of the same name." Works by Le Guin (or a stand-in) include A Wizard of Earthsea and, recently published, The Left Hand of Darkness.

The story was nominated for the 1970 Nebula Award for Best Novelette. Nancy Kress said that "Nine Lives" is "one of the finest cloning stories [ever] written.

"Nine Lives" is one of the few stories Le Guin has described as being "hard-core" science fiction, using the concept of cloning to explore the concept of the "self". Le Guin also disclosed that the inspiration for "Nine Lives" came from a chapter in Gordon Rattray Taylor's 1968 book, The Biological Time Bomb.

In November 2012, "Nine Lives" was published in a two-part collection of short stories Le Guin released called The Unreal and the Real. Volume one was titled Where on Earth and highlighted "interest in realism and magic realism and includes eighteen of Le Guin’s satirical, political, and experimental earthbound stories." Volume two, where "Nine Lives" was published, was titled Outer Space Inner Lands and focused more on Le Guin's non-realistic stories.

== Themes ==
The overarching theme in "Nine Lives" is the concept of the self. Some critics believe that "Nine Lives" also explores the theme of using "technology to illustrate ethical and sociological dilemmas," in addition to examining ideas of humanity and consciousness through the themes of cloning, exploration, paranoia, and disaster. Other critics regard "Nine Lives" as being more "straight" Science Fiction, that doesn't challenge ideas of perspective or weave in messages.
