= Buffalo Gals, Won't You Come Out Tonight =

1987 novelette by Ursula K. Le Guin

- Short story by Ursula K. Le Guin
- Genre: urban fantasy

Publication
- Publisher: The Magazine of Fantasy and Science Fiction
- Publication date: November 1987

"Buffalo Gals, Won't You Come Out Tonight" is a fantasy novelette by American writer Ursula K. Le Guin, originally published in the November 1987 issue of The Magazine of Fantasy & Science Fiction and collected in Buffalo Gals and Other Animal Presences (1987). It tells the story of a lost child who tumbles into the confusing world of Southwestern U.S. desert folklore, and lives for a while with the trickster Coyote. The title is borrowed from the song "Buffalo Gals" where the first line of the chorus is "Buffalo gals, won't you come out tonight?"

It won the Hugo Award for Best Novelette and the World Fantasy Award—Novella in 1988, and was nominated for the Nebula Award for Best Novelette and the Theodore Sturgeon Award.

It was re-published in 1994 by Pomegranate Artbooks with illustrations provided by Susan Seddon Boulet.

== Plot summary ==
The protagonist, Myra, is a young girl whose parents are getting divorced. While flying to her father, her plane crashes in the desert. She is rescued by a talking coyote. Myra lost an eye in the crash. When the coyote licks where her eye was, Myra begins to see her surroundings differently. For example, where she first saw the coyote eating a dead crow, she now sees a human woman with coyote-like attributes cooking salmon.

Eventually, Coyote leads Myra to a village whose inhabitants all appear to be small humans with animal attributes. A man named Jay makes Myra a new eye out of pitch pine. Myra lives with Coyote in a dingy, dark house, but becomes annoyed with Coyote's frequent sexual escapades, which include Coyote's own son. The final straw comes when one of Coyote's lovers attempts to rape Myra.

After hearing that Horse can take her to where "[Myra's] people" live, Myra seeks him out. The duo, joined by Chickadee, find a cattle ranch, but the sight of it is so overwhelming to Myra that she panics and has them take her back to the village. Coyote is initially upset that Myra left her, but eventually forgives her, and the two go to a human city to look for food. Once again, Myra becomes overwhelmed by her surroundings, especially after two hunters try to shoot Coyote. Coyote finds a huge salmon and eats it, but realizes only seconds later that it was poisoned, and dies shortly after.

The next morning, Myra buries Coyote, who no longer appears as a human woman but as a regular coyote. She returns to the poisoned salmon, which now appears as a lamb carcass, and buries it under rocks. Returning to the village, Myra sees Chickadee again, who takes her to meet Grandmother. Grandmother, who turns out to be a spider, gently tells Myra that she must return to the city and be with her father. Myra wants to stay at first, but eventually accepts. Myra is allowed to keep her pitch pine eye.

== Background ==
In the introduction to Buffalo Gals and Other Animal Presences, Le Guin explained that she was influenced by children's literature and non-Christian mythology and folklore. In such stories, animals are often depicted as equal to humans, sometimes even in familial relationships. Le Guin was critical of man vs. nature stories, which she believed depict "the people Civilization calls 'primitive', 'savage,' or 'undeveloped'" (which she identified as including women, children, and the natural world) as lesser than the monotheistic "civilized man."

The story incorporates indigenous American legends and beliefs, especially those from Oregon (Le Guin lived most of her life in Portland). For example, Coyote says that she was once able to throw her eyes in the air, but that they were stolen and she was unable to see. This indeed happened in a Northern Paiute legend. A more modern allusion in the story comes from the name of Coyote's house: she has a sign on it reading "Bide-A-Wee", which both means "stay a while" in Scottish, and is the name of an animal shelter in New York, referencing the character's animal nature.

== Themes ==
"Buffalo Gals, Won't You Come Out Tonight" is a magical realist story with ecofeminist themes. Le Guin's approach to describing the setting and characters has been described as a "gynocentric accent."

Differing viewpoints are a major theme in "Buffalo Gals". Myra's uninjured eye represents the views of the civilized world, and her new one the animal world; in order to gain depth perception, she must learn to use both at the same time, representing the ability to view the same situation from two different viewpoints. Notably, the story does not end with the oposing viewpoints merging together; despite Myra wanting to stay, she returns to her people in the end. However, she does promise to build gardens for Chickadee and never kill spiders, demonstrating that she will still have a respect for nature. In an essay decrying the ecofeminist tendency towards essentialism, critic Karla Armbruster praised the story for depicting a relationship with nature that acknowledges the differences between women and animals. Brian Attebery used the novelette as an example of "situated fantasy", a genre in which contrasting worldviews are represented by the narrative, in this case the civilized world and the world of the animals.

Contrasting views of gender and gender roles are specific viewpoints explored in the story. The animals Myra encounters live a free, matriarchal society that Myra is uncomfortable with, especially in regard to Coyote's sexual habits. Coyote, notably, is female, while most depictions of coyotes in mythology are male Myra eventually comes to view Coyote as a maternal figure, and Coyote fulfils maternal roles such as protecting, feeding, and guiding Myra; however, she also engages in unfeminine habits, such as freely defecating and urinating anywhere and talking to her feces. Myra is initially embarrassed by Coyote's uncharacteristic gender expression, but eventually accepts it.
