= Worlds of Fantasy =

Science fiction magazine

Worlds of Fantasy was an American science fiction magazine published from 1968 to 1971 for a total of four issues. Lester del Rey edited the first two issues; the last two were edited by Ejler Jakobsson. It was intended as a fantasy companion to Galaxy Science Fiction and published some well-received material, including Ursula Le Guin's Tombs of Atuan and Clifford D. Simak's Destiny Doll.
