= The Rule of Names =

- Short story by Ursula K. Le Guin
- Country: United States
- Genre: Fantasy

Publication
- Published in: Fantastic
- Publication type: Magazine
- Media type: Print
- Publication date: 1964

Chronology
- Series: Earthsea
The Word of Unbinding	A Wizard of Earthsea

"The Rule of Names" is a short story by American writer Ursula K. Le Guin, first published in the April 1964 issue of Fantastic and reprinted in collections such as The Wind's Twelve Quarters. This story and "The Word of Unbinding" convey Le Guin's initial concepts for the Earthsea realm, including its places and physical manifestation. Most of the characters from the novels do not make an appearance, with the exception of the dragon Yevaud. Both stories help explain the foundations of the Earthsea realm, in particular the importance of true names to magic.

== Plot summary ==
Sattins Island (among the Islands of Earthsea, though this is not mentioned in the original story) contains a rustic village and a resident wizard, nicknamed "Underhill" because he lives in a cave below a hill. Fat, shy, and largely incompetent, Underhill mostly uses simple magic to help the villagers with day-to-day minor medical and agricultural difficulties. Meanwhile, the village's teacher, the pretty Palani, introduces the concept of naming to her schoolchildren: each citizen of Earthsea has one name as a child, which they abandon at puberty in favor of their "true name", but this name must be kept private as it can be used by ill-intentioned magicians to control the individual.

One day, a lone handsome stranger from the distant Archipelago arrives on the island. The locals dub him Blackbeard. He hires a village lad called Birt to guide him to Underhill's home. Speaking to Birt, Blackbeard reveals his purpose: he is a powerful magician searching for his ancestors' treasure, which was stolen by a dragon. He believes Underhill to be a wizard who defeated the dragon and made off with the treasure.

Birt and Blackbeard arrive at Underhill's home. There, Blackbeard confronts Underhill, culminating in a battle in which the two magicians shapeshift into different animals and natural forces. After Underhill transforms into a massive dragon, Blackbeard reveals that he knows Underhill's true name, Yevaud, and that speaking the name will lock Underhill into his true form. This proves effective, but not as Blackbeard expected; Underhill explains that he is in fact the dragon who stole the treasure of Blackbeard's ancestors, and so his true form is indeed that of a dragon. Blackbeard, caught out, is swiftly dispatched by Yevaud. Meanwhile, Birt flees the island, taking his love Palani with him. As he does so, Yevaud, embracing his predatory dragon nature, prepares to devour the villagers of Sattins Island.

In A Wizard of Earthsea, Ged knows this tale as an ancient bit of lore and makes a desperate gamble based on it.

== Literary significance and criticism ==
Susan Wood writes that during the early 1960s, when Ursula K. Le Guin was selling stories such as "The Word of Unbinding" and "The Rule of Names", she "was an accomplished writer, expressing valuable insights with grace and humour".

The story underscores the importance of language to the entire Earthsea Cycle. In particular, the use of "names" in the title, along with the use of "word" in "The Word of Unbinding", solidifies this message in the first two Earthsea stories. Specifically, within the Earthsea realm, knowing another man's or dragon's true name gives one power over them; as a result, sharing one's true name with another is an act of complete trust.

Richard D. Erlich writes that Le Guin has the dragon Yevaud take on the Tolkienian use-name "Mr. Underhill", (Note: This is the name that the Hobbit Frodo Baggins takes as a travel disguise in The Lord of the Rings.) because "he lives in a small Hobbit-style house under a hill".

In later parts of the Earthsea Cycle, the concept of humans and dragons being akin and having been originally one species is developed, and some persons such as Tehanu have a dual human-dragon nature. However, there is no hint of that in this early story. Yevaud had turned himself into a human being for the purpose of hiding, as Ged turned into a bird in A Wizard of Earthsea and Festin into a fish in "The Word of Unbinding", and there is no suggestion that being human was inherent to him in any way.

== Sources ==
- Bloom, Harold, ed. (1986). Ursula K. Le Guin (1st ed.). New York, New York: Chelsea House. ISBN 0-87754-659-2.
- Erlich, Richard D. (2009). "Earthsea Revisited: Tehanu". Coyote's Song: The Teaching Stories of Ursula K. Le Guin. Milford series: Popular writers of today. Vol. 72. Rockville, Maryland: Wildside Press. pp. 379–417. ISBN 978-1434457752.
- Le Guin, Ursula (1975). The Wind's Twelve Quarters (1st ed.). New York, New York: Harper & Row. ISBN 0-06-012562-4.
- Mathews, Richard (2002). Fantasy: The Liberation of Imagination (1st ed.). New York, New York: Routledge. ISBN 0-415-93890-2.
- Spivack, Charlotte (1984). Ursula K. Le Guin (1st ed.). Boston, Massachusetts: Twayne Publishers. ISBN 0-8057-7393-2.
