= New Dimensions IV =

1974 anthology edited by Robert Silverberg

- Cover of first edition
- Editor: Robert Silverberg
- Language: English
- Series: New Dimensions
- Genre: Science fiction
- Publisher: Signet/New American Library
- Publication date: 1974
- Publication place: United States
- Media type: Print (paperback)
- Pages: 237
- Preceded by: New Dimensions 3
- Followed by: New Dimensions Science Fiction Number 5

New Dimensions IV is an anthology of original science fiction short stories edited by Robert Silverberg, the fourth in a series of twelve. It was first published in paperback by Signet/New American Library in October 1974.

The book collects ten novellas, novelettes and short stories by various science fiction authors.

== Contents ==
- "After the Dreamtime" (Richard A. Lupoff)
- "The Bible After Apocalypse" (Laurence M. Janifer)
- "Outer Concentric" (Felix C. Gotschalk)
- "The Examination" (Felix C. Gotschalk)
- "The Colors of Fear" (Terry Carr)
- "Ariel" (Roger Elwood)
- "State of the Art" (Barry N. Malzberg)
- "Among the Metal-and-People People" (David R. Bunch)
- "Animal Fair" (R. A. Lafferty)
- "Strangers" (Gardner R. Dozois)

== Awards ==
The anthology placed second in the 1975 Locus Poll Award for Best Original Anthology.

"After the Dreamtime" was a finalist for the 1975 Hugo Award for Best Novelette and placed ninth in the 1975 Locus Poll Award for Best Novelette.
