= Karg =

Fictional people group in the Earthsea novels

The Kargs are a fictional people in Ursula K. Le Guin's Earthsea canon.

== Appearance ==
Kargs have fair skin and many have blond hair, unlike the majority of the inhabitants of Earthsea, who have dark skin and hair. Tenar, perhaps the best-known Kargish individual, happens to have dark hair. The Kargs' Nordic appearance and their raider culture resembles the Scandinavian Viking civilisation.

== Culture and religion ==
Within the context of the nonindustrial civilization of Earthsea, the technological level of Karg society is high, having a strongly militaristic and urbanized culture. The Kargs were greatly feared by the people of Earthsea for their piratical raids on the East Reach, but subsequently a peace was reached, giving rise to some trade and commerce between the peoples. The Kargs are skilled sailors, fishers and farmers.

Their literacy level is very low: Tenar remarks that reading is "one of the black arts". Magic was once anathema to the Kargs, and the use of magic among the people of the Archipelago was taken as proof of their wickedness - anyone in the Kargad lands suspected of being a "sorcerer" was put to death. Nevertheless, a few Kargs make their way to Roke to study magic, including Azver, a young warrior who later became the Master Patterner during Ged's tenure as Archmage.

The Kargs have their own religion which is different from the rest of Earthsea. Their principal deities are The Nameless Ones, sentient manifestations of Earth's more malevolent aspects; they are symbolized by darkness and hunger. In many respects, they are similar to Kami. However, their influence declined over the years as successive Karg rulers, the self-styled Godkings, gradually usurped their position at the pinnacle of Karg religion. Although immensely powerful magically, The Nameless Ones are for the most part tied to specific locations. By the time of The Tombs of Atuan, they are seriously worshipped only in a few places, notably an isolated temple complex over an underground labyrinth in which some of them reside on the island of Atuan.

== Notable Kargs ==
In The Tombs of Atuan, Ged ventures into this labyrinth while searching for half of a long-lost magical artifact. He is trapped by the Karg priestess Tenar, who had been trained from childhood to serve The Nameless Ones. Ged shows her that although The Nameless Ones are real, they are malevolent. Ged persuades Tenar to escape with him to Earthsea.

Tenar plays a major role in later novels. She adopts a badly injured abandoned child in Tehanu, and advises King Lebannen in The Other Wind.

Aside from the Master Patterner mentioned above, the only other Karg of note is Seserakh in The Other Wind, a princess sent without consultation to marry the initially unwilling Lebannen.

== The Kargad Lands - geography ==
The Kargad Lands consist of four large islands in north-eastern Earthsea, to the northeast of Havnor. Though they lie outside of the Archipelago itself, they do not belong to either the East or the North Reach.

- Karego-At: The most important island, it contains the capital, Awabath.
- Hur-at-Hur: The largest of the Kargad islands.
- Atuan: One of the smaller Kargad islands, but one of the most important. It contains the Place of the Tombs of Atuan, which is the setting for most of the book The Tombs of Atuan. A large part of Atuan is desert. One of its cities is called Tenecbah.
- Atnini: The smallest Kargad island is sparsely populated.
