= New Dimensions II =

1972 anthology edited by Robert Silverberg

- Cover of first edition
- Editor: Robert Silverberg
- Cover artist: Dickran Palulian
- Language: English
- Series: New Dimensions
- Genre: Science fiction
- Publisher: Doubleday
- Publication date: 1972
- Publication place: United States
- Media type: Print (hardcover)
- Pages: viii, 229 pp.
- ISBN: 0-385-09141-9
- Preceded by: New Dimensions 1
- Followed by: New Dimensions 3

New Dimensions II: Eleven Original Science Fiction Stories is an anthology of original science fiction short stories edited by American writer Robert Silverberg, the second in a series of twelve. It was first published in hardcover by Doubleday in December 1972, with a paperback edition under the variant title New Dimensions 2 following from Avon Books in December 1974.

The book collects eleven novelettes and short stories by various science fiction authors, together with an introduction by the editor.

== Contents ==
- "Introduction" (Robert Silverberg)
- "Nobody's Home" (Joanna Russ)
- "Filomena & Greg & Rikki-Tikki & Barlow & the Alien" (James Tiptree, Jr.)
- "Out from Ganymede" (Barry N. Malzberg)
- "No. 2 Plain Tank Auxiliary Fill Structural Limit 17,605 lbs. Fuel-PWA Spec. 522 Revised" (Edward Bryant)
- "Eurema's Dam" (R. A. Lafferty)
- "King Harvest" (Gardner R. Dozois)
- "Take a Match" (Isaac Asimov)
- "f(x)=(11/15/67) x=her, f(x)!=0" (Geo. Alec Effinger)
- "White Summer in Memphis" (Gordon Eklund)
- "Lazarus II" (Miriam Allen deFord)
- "The Men Inside" (Barry N. Malzberg)

== Awards ==
The anthology placed third in the 1973 Locus Poll Award for Best Anthology.

"Nobody's Home" placed fourteenth in the 1973 Locus Poll Award for Best Short Fiction.

"Eurema's Dam" won the 1973 Hugo Award for Best Short Story and the 1975 Seiun Award for Best Translated Short Story, and placed sixteenth in the 1973 Locus Poll Award for Best Short Fiction.
