= Vaster than Empires and More Slow =

Story by Ursula K. Le Guin

"Vaster than Empires and More Slow" is a science fiction story by American author Ursula K. Le Guin, first published in the collection New Dimensions 1, edited by Robert Silverberg. It is set in the fictional Hainish universe, where Earth is a member of an interstellar "League of Worlds". The anthology was released in United States in 1971, by Doubleday Books.

The story follows an exploratory ship sent by the League to investigate a newly discovered planet, named World 4470. The team includes Osden, an "empath" who is able to feel the emotions of those around him; however, he has an abrasive personality that leads to tensions within the team. The ship finds World 4470 to be a world covered in forests, and apparently devoid of animal life. Over time the team begins to feel a fear emanating from the planet. They realize that all the vegetation on the planet is part of a singular consciousness, which is reacting in fear at the explorers after spending its whole life in isolation.

Like Le Guin's later novel The Word for World Is Forest, this story examines the relationship between humans and their natural environment. The story also makes repeated references to the poetry of Andrew Marvell, including in the title. The story was republished in Le Guin's collections The Wind's Twelve Quarters and Buffalo Gals and Other Animal Presences, as well as in many other anthologies. It was nominated for the Hugo Award in 1972.

== Background and setting ==
The story is set in the fictional Hainish universe, which Le Guin introduced in her first novel Rocannon's World, published in 1966. In this alternate history, human beings did not evolve on Earth, but on Hain. The people of Hain colonized many neighboring planetary systems, including Terra (Earth) and Athshe, possibly a million years before the setting of the novels. The planets subsequently lost contact with each other, for reasons that Le Guin does not explain. Le Guin does not narrate the entire history of the Hainish universe at once, instead letting readers piece it together from various works.

The novels and other fictional works set in the Hainish universe recount the efforts to re-establish a galactic civilization. Explorers from Hain as well as other planets use interstellar ships taking years to travel between planetary systems, although the journey is shortened for the travelers due to relativistic time dilation. "Vaster than Empires" is set soon after the formation of the League of All Worlds, at a time when the League is still sending out exploratory ships to investigate new planets. "Vaster than Empires," like other works such as The Word for World Is Forest and "The Ones Who Walk Away from Omelas" explore worlds that have gone wrong in some way. The title of the story is taken from a poem by Andrew Marvell, titled "To His Coy Mistress". The line from which the title is derived reads "My vegetable love should grow/Vaster than empires, and more slow." In the internal chronology of the Hainish cycle, "Vaster than Empires" takes place after The Dispossessed and before The Word for World is Forest.

== Plot summary ==
A survey ship is sent by the League of Worlds to a planet far outside the region of the galaxy it has previously colonized. The crew consists of 10 people, including five Terrans (people from Earth). One of the crew members, named Osden, is an "empath". He has the ability to feel the emotions of any sentient creatures around him, including humans. His abilities are depicted as being the result of his being treated for autism. The team is led by Tomiko Haito, a woman of East-Asian descent, whose official title is "coordinator". Tensions among the team members run high from the very beginning; in addition to several neurotic personalities, Osden's abrasive personality causes the others to dislike him intensely. The team arrives at the planet, named World 4470. They find it completely covered in vegetation, and seemingly devoid of intelligent life. Osden, whose role is to sense the presence of sentient beings, senses nothing. After some exploration, the scientists find that there is nothing resembling animal life on the planet; all of its life-forms are either photosynthetic, or feed off of dead plant material.

Due to the tensions between Osden and the rest, he is sent alone to do a species survey in the forest. While he is still out alone, Porlock, one of the scientists on the team, is scared by what he believes to be a large ape in the forest. The other team members investigate without finding anything, while Osden fails to contact them at a pre-assigned time. Tomiko leads three others to his camp in the forest, where they find him knocked out by an unknown assailant. They bring him back to camp, where he tells the group that he had felt a strong fear response from the forest itself. Tomiko realizes that the assailant must have been one of the other team members. While Osden is asleep, the fear emanations from the forest drive Porlock to verbally lash out at Osden, and admit to trying to kill him in the forest. Porlock attempts to assault Osden again, but the others restrain him and place him under a sedative.

The team decides to try a different location on the planet, in the hope of moving away from the sentience they believe to be in the forest. They find that the fear emanations can be felt at their new camp as well, which is in a grassland, which makes them realize that the sentience extends over all of the vegetation on the planet. Osden realizes that this sentience has never been in contact with anything alien before; thus it experienced fear when the explorers landed. Osden decides to attempt to communicate with the sentience, with the help of Tomiko and two others. They land in the middle of a forest, where a surge in the fear response kills one of them. Osden leaves the group, and by surrendering to the fear completely makes the planet understand that they mean it no harm; and the fear emanations cease. The group tries to locate Osden, but is unable to find him; Tomiko suspects that he does not want to be found. They leave him enough provisions for the rest of his life, and return to Terra after finishing the survey.

== Themes ==
A major theme in this story is that of a symbiotic relationship between a planet and its inhabitants, similar to that in The Word for World Is Forest. In her introduction to the story, Le Guin stated "We all have forests in our minds. Forests unexplored, unending. Each of us gets lost in the forests, every night, alone." The "vegetable love" referred to in the poem from which the title is taken can be used to describe the final relationship between Osden and the planetary intelligence of World 4470. When Osden is attacked by Porlock in the planet, he transmits his fear to the planet, which amplifies it and reflects it back at him. Thus Osden's role is similar to that of Selver in The Word for World is Forest, in that he introduces violence to the forest world. The intelligence of Le Guin's forest has been contrasted to the "low" position occupied by vegetative beings in the works of other science fiction authors such as Arthur C. Clarke.

An additional similarity between The Word for World Is Forest and "Vaster than Empires" is the theme of first contact between humans and a new environment. In "Vaster than Empires," the forest is both the setting for the story and a character in it. The forest directly responds to the humans with fear, a response that is similar to the response of Osden, the empath, to the rest of society: "the normal defensive-aggressive reaction between strangers meeting." Thus Le Guin makes an analogy between contact between humans and aliens, and contact between individual humans; both are contact between the self and the "other".

Osden is depicted as having a strong empathetic connection with the vegetated planet visited by the explorers. This is in contrast to the sharply antagonistic relationship that the other members of the team have with him. The team is depicted as a dysfunctional group, with each individual having quirks and oddities of their own. They are regarded as being of "unsound mind" by the people of Earth and Hain, because they were willing to travel on a voyage that lasted 500 years of actual time. The fear transmitted by the forest drives them further into their neuroticism. In contrast, Osden the empath surrenders completely to the forest, and thus achieves a mental unity with the planet. In choosing a sort of union with the planet, Osden shows that the singular consciousness of the vegetative creature is preferable to the chaos and discord in human society.

At the conclusion of the story Tomiko describes Osden's relationship with the planet, saying "He had taken the fear into himself, and, accepting, had transcended it. He had given up his self to the alien, an unreserved surrender, that left no place for evil. He had learned the love of the Other and thereby had been given his whole self." Osden achieves a completely empathetic relationship with the planet, "both literally and figuratively in touch with the forest;" which also grants him temporary goodwill towards humans, as he says "Listen, I will you well" before leaving his colleagues. Le Guin's depiction of the planetary vegetative intelligence is of something that is "whole, undifferentiated and unconscious." Thus, it finds the very concept of other beings terrifying, and it is qualitatively different from animal intelligences. Le Guin makes two more references to Marvell's poetry at the conclusion of the story, the first of which refers to the notion of a planetary consciousness. Marvell's poem "The Garden" speaks of "a green thought in a green shade"; Le Guin describes World 4470 as "one big green thought." The second reference is in the penultimate paragraph: while describing Osden’s relationship with the planet, Tomiko says, "Had we but world enough and time…", quoting verbatim from "To His Coy Mistress".

== Reception ==
Lynda Schneekloth described "Vaster than Empires" as "one of the most interesting explorations of a vegetative sentience," in the magazine Extrapolation. "Vaster than Empires" was anthologized in the collection Science Fiction: A Historical Anthology, edited by Eric S. Rabkin. In his introduction to the story, Rabkin stated that it "takes the frenzy of exploration and science, paints it green, and frames it with stability." He described the story as having an expansive and hopeful vision of a peaceful world, in contrast to the constant warfare of reality. In contrast, Elizabeth Cummins described the work as "exploring the limits of utopia." Suzanne Reid praised the story as a "Le Guin classic" that "unites the action with the psyche". A retrospective review in Tor noted that the story was unusual for a Hainish Universe piece for not examining a human society, and said it raised interesting ideas about "disability, ecology, sentience, and emotion".

== Publication and awards ==
"Vaster than Empires and More Slow" was first published in the collection New Dimensions 1, edited by Robert Silverberg. The anthology was released in United States in 1971, by Doubleday Books. It has since been reprinted in several collections and anthologies, including in The Wind's Twelve Quarters and Buffalo Gals and Other Animal Presences, which are collections of Le Guin's stories and poetry. The story was dramatized in the National Public Radio series 2000X, which aired on 11 April 2000. The story was nominated for the Hugo Award for Best Short Story in 1972, and came 14th in a poll for the Locus Award for Best Short Story.

== Sources ==
- Cummins, Elizabeth (1990). Understanding Ursula K. Le Guin. Columbia, South Carolina: University of South Carolina Press. ISBN 0-87249-687-2.
- Erlich, Richard D. (1987). "Ursula K. Le Guin and Arthur C. Clarke on Immanence, Transcendence, and Massacres". Extrapolation. 28 (2). The Kent State University Press: 105–129. doi:10.3828/extr.1987.28.2.105.
- Le Guin, Ursula K. (1987). Buffalo Gals And Other Animal Presences. Santa Barbara, California: Capra Press.
- Masri, Heather (2015). Science fiction: Stories and contexts. Boston, Massachusetts: Bedford/St Martin's. ISBN 978-0-312-45015-1.
- Rabkin, Eric S. (1983). Science Fiction: A Historical Anthology. New York, New York: Oxford University Press. ISBN 978-0-19-503272-7.
- Reid, Suzanne Elizabeth (1997). Presenting Ursula Le Guin. New York, New York: Twayne. ISBN 0-8057-4609-9.
- Schneekloth, Lynda H. (2001). "Plants: The ultimate alien". Extrapolation. 42 (3): 246–254. doi:10.3828/extr.2001.42.3.246.
- Slusser, George Edgar (1976). The Farthest Shores of Ursula K. Le Guin. San Bernardino, California: Wildside Press LLC. ISBN 978-0-89370-205-2.
- Spivack, Charlotte (1984). Ursula K. Le Guin (1st ed.). Boston, Massachusetts: Twayne Publishers. ISBN 0-8057-7393-2.
- Watson, Ian (November 1975). "The Forest as Metaphor for Mind: "The Word for World is Forest" and "Vaster Than Empires and More Slow"". Science Fiction Studies. 2 (3): 231–237.
