= Rob Inglis =

Australian-British actor (1933–2021)

Rob Inglis

Robert Keith Inglis (9 March 1933 – 23 May 2021) was an Australian-British actor, playwright, dramatist, journalist, critic and producer. He was the narrator of the first unabridged audiobook editions of J. R. R. Tolkien's The Lord of the Rings and The Hobbit.

== Life and career ==
Inglis was born in Australia on 9 March 1933, and moved to England in 1955.

His plays included Voyage of the Endeavour (1965), based on the journal of Captain James Cook; Canterbury Tales (1968), dramatised readings from Chaucer; Erf (1971), a one-actor play about the twenty-first century; A Rum Do (1970), a musical based on the governorship of Lachlan Macquarie; and Men Who Shaped Australia, for Better or for Worse (1968), a one-actor play dealing with significant historical figures.

For the Australian Museum in Sydney, as the theatrical producer in 1979, Inglis worked with secondary school students to direct an ecological drama "What are you doing, strange creature?" The creation of this drama from initial idea to final performance - script, songs, staging, programmes - engaged some sixty "Discoverers" for months, translating ideas on conservation of the environment into visual forms.

His more recent works include a play about Lisa Pontecorvo, the daughter of geneticist Guido Pontecorvo, it played in small theatres and community centres around England in 2010 and 2011. In 2012, he was awarded a £16,000 Arts Council grant to write Regent's Canal, a Folk Opera, a musical that celebrates the 200th anniversary of the digging of the eight-mile Regent's Canal.

Inglis adapted works to stage for one-man performances of A Christmas Carol (1983), and Dr Jekyll and Mr Hyde, for which Inglis was called "one of the wonders of the Fringe." He has also adapted Chaucer, Shakespeare, Tolkien and Orwell to one act performances. Inglis has appeared with the Royal Shakespeare Company and the Royal Court Theatre, playing characters such as the Ghost and Claudius in Hamlet and Mr. Bumble in Oliver!.

Inglis' television appearances include as Ned Kelly in The Stringybark Massacre (short, 1968); as Chief sub in Play for Today (TV series, 1978/79); as Professor Doom in Wizbit (TV series, 1986); as Alan Clark in Casualty (TV series, 2002).

Inglis narrated audiobooks by Tolkien (described below), and the first three books by Ursula K. Le Guin in the Earthsea Cycle.

As of 2012, Inglis was living in Somers Town, a district in central London. He died 23 May 2021 of undisclosed causes, possibly in Australia. He was 88 years old.

== Tolkien works ==
In the 1970s and 80s, Inglis wrote, produced and acted in one-man stage dramatisations of The Hobbit and The Lord of the Rings. The performance of The Hobbit won the Festival Times 'Best Solo' award in 1981.

It was through his one-man stage adaptations that he was noticed by Recorded Books and asked to narrate an unabridged edition of Lord of the Rings (1990) and soon after The Hobbit (1991). It was one of Recorded Books best-selling titles however prior to 2012 it was only available on physical media (CD-ROM or tape) at which point it was released in digital format. Laura Miller of Salon.com said

"Inglis strikes precisely the right note in his narration. It is an old-fashioned audiobook narration, one that feels more read than performed, although the voices of the many characters are all well-developed. It's ever so slightly prosy, and the sensation conveyed is exactly like listening to a favourite relative read to a beloved child the same book he (beautifully) read to you when you were a child."

Until Andy Serkis' 2020 recording, Inglis' reading of The Hobbit was the only commercially available unabridged edition of the book. The J.R.R. Tolkien Encyclopedia (2006) called it a "remarkable performance in which he provides distinctive voices for the various characters and sings the songs in the story". It further says of The Lord of the Rings narration, "his voices for the characters are less dramatic and there are no sound effects".

In a 2001 AudioFile interview, Inglis says they recorded Lord of the Rings in an "intense" six-week period in 1990 at the New York studio of Recorded Books. They then recorded The Hobbit about a year later. Inglis prepared with guidance from acting colleges in dramatic societies to perfect the many character voices. Inglis says, "There is much in the original writing that suggests how a character should be brought to life. It's quite strange. At times it felt like Tolkien himself was talking to me through his prose, telling me how things should be." Inglis says he composed some of the music for the songs himself, some music was composed by Tolkien, and Claudia Howard of Recorded Books composed the rest.
