= The Word of Unbinding =

- Short story by Ursula K. Le Guin
- Country: United States
- Language: English
- Genre: Fantasy

Publication
- Published in: Fantastic
- Publication type: Magazine
- Media type: Print
- Publication date: 1964

Chronology
- Series: Earthsea
—	The Rule of Names

"The Word of Unbinding" is a short story by American writer Ursula K. Le Guin, first published in the January 1964 issue of Fantastic, and reprinted in collections such as The Wind's Twelve Quarters. In this story, the Earthsea realm, later made setting of the novel A Wizard of Earthsea, was first introduced. Along with the story "The Rule of Names", this story conveys Le Guin's initial concepts for the Earthsea realm, including its places and physical manifestation, but not the characters appearing in the novels.

== Plot summary ==
At the beginning of the story, the protagonist, a wizard named Festin, finds himself imprisoned. Thinking back, he recalls his apprehension at the news that the evil wizard Voll had been marching from island to island, among the islands of Earthsea subduing all in his way, with no one able to understand or fight his magic. Festin determines that Voll must have just reached his island; thus his imprisonment.

At first Festin, a strong wizard in his own right, is confident of his power to escape and overcome Voll – but all his attempts are rebuffed more than defeated. Finally, Festin's desperate longing for his beloved countryside makes him transform himself into a fish, swimming in one of the island's cool streams. However, Voll has noticed what happened, and a troll, one of the evil one's servants, finds and takes Festin out of the water. The wizard is trapped by his own spell and cannot change back.

By now, Festin has realized that the source of Voll's power and invulnerability is that he is already dead, and controls his servants from the world of the dead. The only course left to Festin is The Word of Unbinding, the uttering of which is tantamount to suicide – but which enables Festin to get at his enemy and destroy him.

Festin has forever lost the joys of his beloved island, but his sacrifice has saved others from Voll.

== Literary significance and criticism ==
Susan Wood writes that Le Guin's early stories of the 1960s such as "The Word of Unbinding" and "The Rule of Names" show that she "was an accomplished writer, expressing valuable insights with grace and humour."

"The Word of Unbinding" underscores the importance of language to the entire Earthsea mythos. In particular, the use of "word" in the title, along with the use of "names" in "The Rule of Names" solidifies this message in the first two Earthsea stories.

The story foreshadows The Farthest Shore in which Ged similarly goes into the world of the dead to fight a "dead" enemy threatening the world of the living, and defeats him at the cost of enormous sacrifice (though in that case, of his power rather than his life).

== Sources ==
- Bernardo, Susan M.; Murphy, Graham J. (2006). Ursula K. Le Guin: A Critical Companion (1st ed.). Westport, Connecticut: Greenwood Press. ISBN 0-313-33225-8.
- Bloom, Harold, ed. (1986). Ursula K. Le Guin (1st ed.). New York, New York: Chelsea House. ISBN 0-87754-659-2.
- Cadden, Mike (2005). Ursula K. Le Guin Beyond Genre: Fiction for Children and Adults (1st ed.). New York, New York: Routledge. ISBN 0-415-99527-2.
- Le Guin, Ursula (1975). The Wind's Twelve Quarters (1st ed.). New York, New York: Harper & Row. ISBN 0-06-012562-4.
- Mathews, Richard (2002). Fantasy: The Liberation of Imagination (1st ed.). New York: Routledge. ISBN 0-415-93890-2.
- Spivack, Charlotte (1984). Ursula K. Le Guin (1st ed.). Boston, Massachusetts: Twayne Publishers. ISBN 0-8057-7393-2.
