= New Dimensions 3 =

1973 anthology edited by Robert Silverberg

- Cover of first edition
- Editor: Robert Silverberg
- Cover artist: Dennis Anderson
- Language: English
- Series: New Dimensions
- Genre: Science fiction
- Publisher: Nelson Doubleday/SFBC
- Publication date: 1973
- Publication place: United States
- Media type: Print (hardcover)
- Pages: vii, 212
- Preceded by: New Dimensions II
- Followed by: New Dimensions IV

New Dimensions 3 is an anthology of original science fiction short stories edited by Robert Silverberg, the third in a series of twelve. It was first published in hardcover by Nelson Doubleday/SFBC in October 1973, with a paperback edition under the variant title New Dimensions III following from Signet/New American Library in February 1974.

The book collects eleven novelettes and short stories by various science fiction authors, together with an introduction by the editor.

== Contents ==
- "Introduction" (Robert Silverberg)
- "The Ones Who Walk Away from Omelas" (Ursula K. Le Guin)
- "Down There" (Damon Knight)
- "How Shall We Conquer?" (W. Macfarlane)
- "They Live on Levels" (Terry Carr)
- "The Girl Who Was Plugged In" (James Tiptree, Jr.)
- "Days of Grass, Days of Straw" (R. A. Lafferty)
- "Notes Leading Down to the Conquest" (Barry N. Malzberg)
- "At the Bran Foundry" (Geo. Alec Effinger)
- "Tell Me All About Yourself" (F. M. Busby)
- "Three Comedians" (Gordon Eklund)
- "The Last Day of July" (Gardner R. Dozois)

== Awards ==
The anthology placed second in the 1974 Locus Poll Award for Best Original Anthology.

"The Ones Who Walk Away from Omelas" won the 1974 Hugo Award for Best Short Story, placed sixth in the 1974 Locus Poll Award for Best Short Fiction, and was a preliminary nominee for the 2017 Prometheus Hall of Fame Award.

"The Girl Who Was Plugged In" won the 1974 Hugo Award for Best Novella, was nominated for the 1974 Nebula Award for Best Novelette, and placed fourth in the 1974 Locus Poll Award for Best Short Fiction.
