= New Dimensions 1 =

1971 anthology edited by Robert Silverberg

- Cover of first edition, 1971
- Editor: Robert Silverberg
- Cover artist: Nick Aristovulos
- Language: English
- Series: New Dimensions
- Genre: Science fiction
- Publisher: Doubleday Books
- Publication date: 1971
- Publication place: United States
- Media type: Print (hardback & paperback)
- Pages: 246
- Followed by: New Dimensions II

New Dimensions 1 is an anthology of original science fiction stories edited by American writer Robert Silverberg, published in hardcover by Doubleday Books in 1971 and reprinted in paperback by Avon Books in 1973. While Silverberg had previously compiled several reprint anthologies, New Dimensions 1 was the first anthology of original work he edited. It placed second in the annual Locus Poll for best original anthology.

== Contents ==
- "A Special Kind of Morning", Gardner Dozois
- "The Trouble with the Past". Alex & Phyllis Eisenstein
- "The Power of Time", Josephine Saxton
- "The Giberel", Doris Pitkin Buck
- "Vaster Than Empires and More Slow", Ursula K. Le Guin
- "The Great A", Robert C. Malstrom
- "At the Mouse Circus", Harlan Ellison
- "A Plague of Cars", Leonard Tushnet
- "Sky", R. A. Lafferty
- "Love Song of Herself", Edward Bryant
- "The Wicked Flee", Harry Harrison
- "The Sliced-Crosswise Only-On-Tuesday World", Philip José Farmer
- "Conquest" Barry N. Malzberg
- "Emancipation: A Romance of the Times to Come", Thomas M. Disch

"Vaster Than Empires and More Slow", "A Special Kind of Morning", and "Sky" were nominated for the Hugo Award. "A Special Kind of Morning" was also nominated for the Nebula Award.

== Reception ==
Theodore Sturgeon praised Silverberg's selection of stories, saying "His writers shine in the dark."
