= From Up on Poppy Hill =

2011 Studio Ghibli film

- Theatrical release poster by Hayao Miyazaki

Japanese name
- Kanji: コクリコ坂から
- Literal meaning: From Coquelicot Hill
Transcriptions
- Revised Hepburn: Kokuriko-zaka Kara
- Directed by: Gorō Miyazaki
- Screenplay by: Hayao Miyazaki; Keiko Niwa
- Based on: Kokuriko-zaka kara by: Chizuru Takahashi; Tetsurō Sayama
- Produced by: Toshio Suzuki
- Starring: Masami Nagasawa; Junichi Okada; Keiko Takeshita; Yuriko Ishida; Jun Fubuki; Takashi Naito; Shunsuke Kazama; Nao Omori; Teruyuki Kagawa
- Cinematography: Atsushi Okui
- Edited by: Takeshi Seyama
- Music by: Satoshi Takebe
- Production company: Studio Ghibli
- Distributed by: Toho
- Release date: July 16, 2011 (Japan)
- Running time: 92 minutes
- Country: Japan
- Language: Japanese
- Budget: ¥2.2 billion; ($22 million)
- Box office: $61.5 million (Worldwide); ¥4.5 billion (Japan)

From Up on Poppy Hill (Japanese: コクリコ坂から, Hepburn: Kokuriko-zaka Kara; lit. 'From Coquelicot Hill') is a 2011 Japanese animated drama film directed by Gorō Miyazaki, written by Hayao Miyazaki and Keiko Niwa, animated by Studio Ghibli for the Nippon Television Network, Dentsu, Hakuhodo DY Media Partners, Walt Disney Japan, Mitsubishi, and Toho, and distributed by the latter company. It is based on the 1980 manga illustrated by Chizuru Takahashi and written by Tetsurō Sayama. The film stars the voices of Masami Nagasawa, Junichi Okada, Keiko Takeshita, Yuriko Ishida, Jun Fubuki, Takashi Naito, Shunsuke Kazama, Nao Ōmori and Teruyuki Kagawa.

Set in 1963 Yokohama, Japan, the film tells the story of Umi Matsuzaki (Nagasawa), a high school girl living in an old hospital turned boarding house, the 'Coquelicot Manor'. When Umi meets Shun Kazama (Okada), a member of the school's newspaper club, they decide to clean up the school's clubhouse, the 'Latin Quarter'. However, Tokumaru (Kagawa), the chairman of the local school board and a businessman, intends to demolish the building for redevelopment for the 1964 Summer Olympics, Umi and Shun, along with class president Shirō Mizunuma (Kazama), must persuade Tokumaru to reconsider.

From Up on Poppy Hill premiered in Japan on July 16, 2011. It received positive reviews from most film critics and grossed $61 million worldwide. An English version was distributed by GKIDS; it was released to theaters on March 15, 2013, in North America.

== Plot ==
In 1963 Japan, teenager Umi Matsuzaki lives in Coquelicot Manor, a boarding house overlooking the Port of Yokohama. Her mother, Ryoko, is a medical professor studying in the United States. Umi runs the house and looks after her younger siblings and her grandmother. Each morning, Umi raises a set of signal flags with the message "I pray for safe voyages".

One day, a poem about the flags being raised is published in Konan Academy's newspaper. Shun Kazama, the poem's author, witnesses the flags from the sea as he rides his father's tugboat to school. At first, Umi gets the wrong impression of Shun as he does a daredevil stunt on behalf of the "Latin Quarter", an old building housing their high school's clubs that is being threatened with demolition. Upon her sister's request, Umi accompanies her to obtain Shun's autograph at the Latin Quarter. She learns Shun and the school's student government president Shirō Mizunuma publish the school newspaper. Umi convinces Shirō and Shun to renovate the Latin Quarter, and all the students contribute, both boys and girls. Umi and Shun start having feelings for each other.

At a party, Umi shows Shun a photograph of three young naval men. One of them is her deceased father, Yūichirō Sawamura, who was killed while serving on a supply ship during the Korean War. Shun is stunned, as he has a duplicate of the photograph. His father admits shortly after the end of World War II, Yūichirō arrived at their house one evening with an infant, Shun, along with a birth certificate from the Family Registry. The Kazamas had recently lost their newborn, so they adopted Shun. At first, Shun tries to avoid Umi, then he finally tells her they are siblings. Umi and Shun repress their romantic feelings and they continue to see each other as friends.

The renovation of the Latin Quarter is complete, but the Kanagawa Prefectural Board of Education decides to proceed with the building's demolition anyway. Shirō, Shun, and Umi take the train to Tokyo, which is preparing for the 1964 Summer Olympics, and meet with Tokumaru, the school board's chairman. They successfully convince him to come inspect the Latin Quarter. Umi later professes her love to Shun, and he reciprocates in spite of their situation.

Having just returned from the United States, Ryoko tells Umi that Shun's father was actually Hiroshi Tachibana, the second man in the photo. In 1945, Tachibana was killed in an accident on a repatriation ship. Shun's mother died in childbirth, and his other relatives were killed in the bombing of Nagasaki. Ryoko was unable to raise Shun, as she was already pregnant with Umi at the time. Yūichirō registered the child as his own to avoid leaving Shun as an orphan in the confusing postwar years, but Shun was eventually given to the Kazamas.

Tokumaru visits the Latin Quarter and, impressed by the students' efforts, cancels the demolition. Umi and Shun are summoned to the harbor. They meet Yoshio Onodera, the third man in the photograph and the sole survivor of the three, now a ship's captain. Confirming Umi and Shun are not related by blood, he tells the full story of the three men's history. With everything resolved, Umi resumes her daily routine of raising the flags, but now, it is not just for her father.

== Voice cast ==
- Masami Nagasawa as Umi Matsuzaki (松崎 海, Matsuzaki Umi), the oldest daughter of a family that runs a lodging house and a student at Konan Academy. Young Umi, in flashbacks, is voiced by Aoi Watanabe, and both versions of the character are voiced by Sarah Bolger in the English-language version. In the series she is nicknamed "Meru". "Umi" and "Mer" means "sea" in Japanese and French respectively.
- Junichi Okada as Shun Kazama (風間 俊, Kazama Shun), the school newspaper president whom Umi takes an interest in. Shun is voiced by Anton Yelchin in the English-language version.
  - Okada also provides the uncredited voice of Yūichirō Sawamura (澤村 雄一郎, Sawamura Yūichirō), Umi Matsuzaki's deceased father.
- Keiko Takeshita as Hana Matsuzaki (松崎 花, Matsuzaki Hana), Umi's maternal grandmother and owner of boarding house. Hana is voiced by Edie Mirman.
- Jun Fubuki as Ryoko Matsuzaki (松崎 良子, Matsuzaki Ryōko), Umi's mother, who is a medical professor studying in the United States. Ryoko is voiced by Jamie Lee Curtis in the English-language version.
- Yuriko Ishida as Miki Hokuto (北斗 美樹, Hokuto Miki), a doctor-in-training staying at Coquelicot's apartment. Miki is voiced by Gillian Anderson in the English-language version.
- Nao Ōmori as Akio Kazama (風間 明雄, Kazama Akio), Shun's adoptive father. Akio is voiced by Chris Noth in the English-language version.
- Takashi Naito as Yoshio Onodera (小野寺 善雄, Onodera Yoshio), a ship captain and an old friend of Umi and Shun's parents. Onodera is voiced by Bruce Dern in the English-language version.
- Shunsuke Kazama as Shirō Mizunuma (水沼 史郎, Mizunuma Shirō), the student council president and Shun's friend. Shirō is voiced by Charlie Saxton in the English-language version.
  - Kazama also provides the uncredited voice of Hiroshi Tachibana (立花 洋, Tachibana Hiroshi), Shun Kazama's deceased father.
- Teruyuki Kagawa as Chief Director Tokumaru (徳丸理事長, Tokumaru Rijichō), the chairman of the school board and a businessman living in Tokyo. He is based on Tokuma Shoten president Yasuyoshi Tokuma. Tokumaru is voiced by Beau Bridges in the English-language version.
- Haruka Shiraishi as Sora Matsuzaki (松崎 空, Matsuzaki Sora) and Tsubasa Kobayashi as Riku Matsuzaki (松崎 陸, Matsuzaki Riku), Umi's younger siblings; Sora is voiced by Isabelle Fuhrman and Riku is voiced by Alex Wolff and Raymond Ochoa in the English-language version.
- Rumi Hiiragi as Sachiko Hirokoji (広小路 幸子, Hirokōji Sachiko), an art college student staying at Coquelicot's apartment; Aubrey Plaza voices Sachiko in the English-language version.
- Eiko Kanazawa provides the voice of Saori Makimura (マキムラ サオリ, Makimura Saori), a boarder at Coquelicot's house; Christina Hendricks voices Makimura in the English-language version.
- Toshimi Kanno and Aoi Teshima voice Nobuko (信子, Nobuko) and Yuko (悠子, Yūko) respectively, Umi's friends and classmates; Emily Osment voices Nobuko and Bridget Hoffman voices Yuko in the English-language version.

The cast also includes director Gorō Miyazaki with the voice of Konan Academy's world history teacher. In the English version, he is voiced by Ronan Farrow. In the English-language version, Jeff Dunham voiced Gen and Ron Howard voiced the Philosophy Club's president.

== Historical basis ==
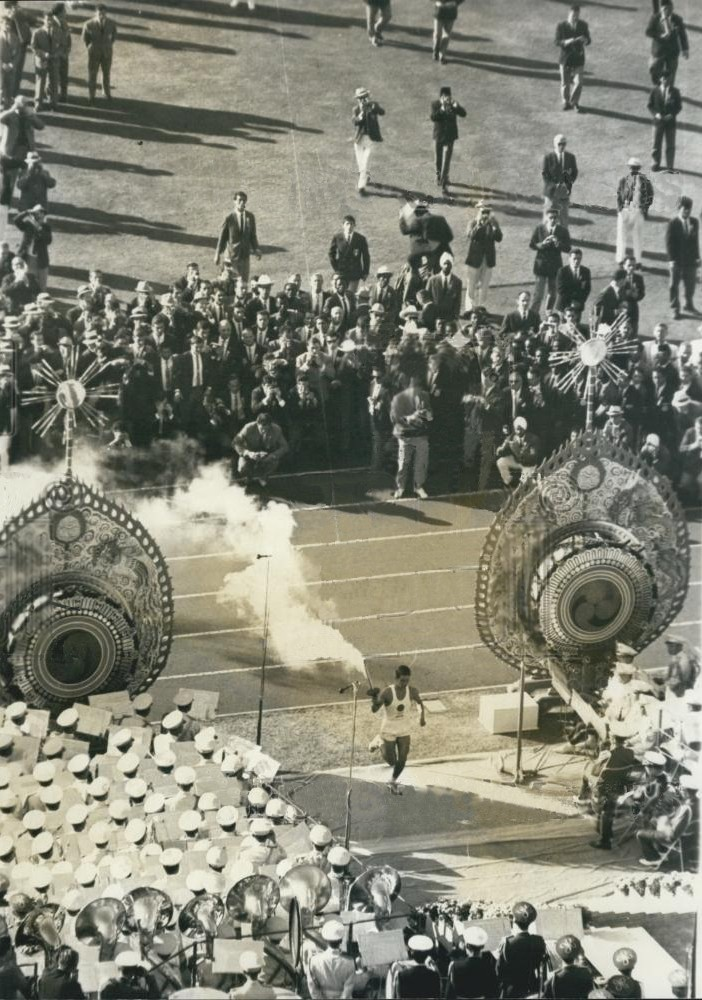
Running toward the 1964 Olympic flame. Tokyo Olympics was a symbol of the new Japan.

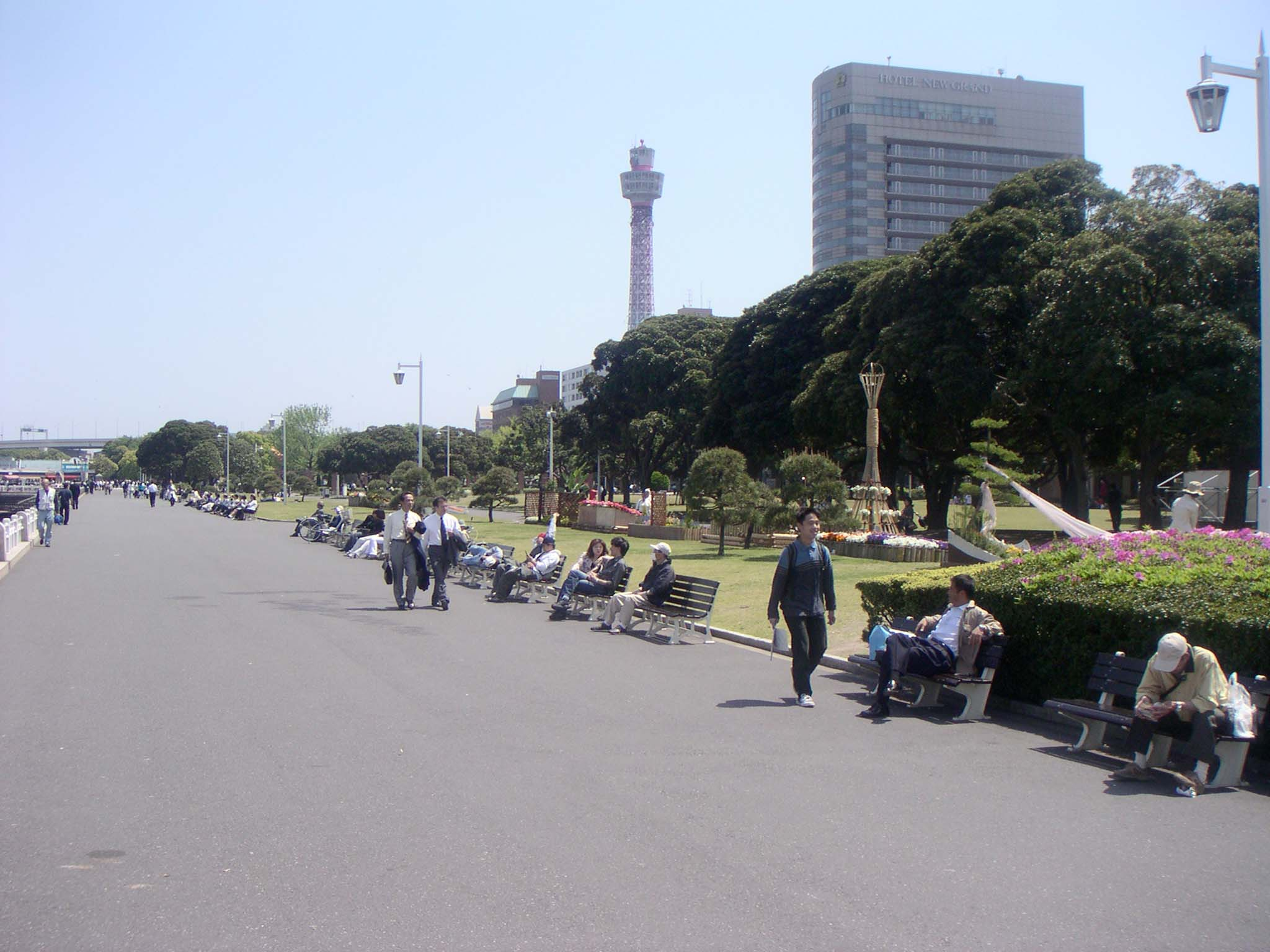
Yamashita Park

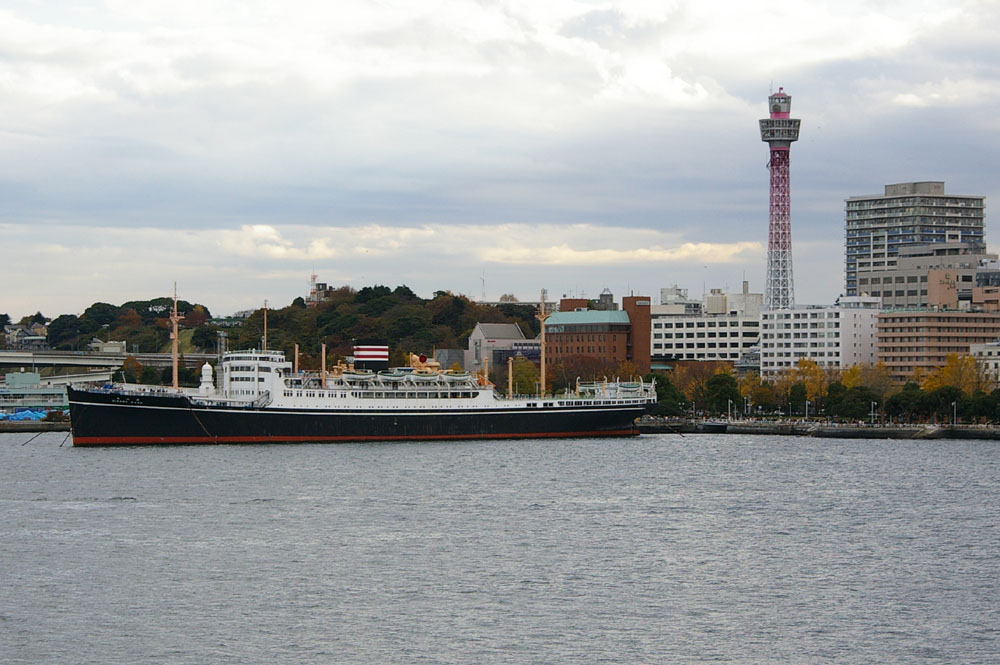
Hikawa Maru

In the film, Umi's father was killed when his Landing Ship, Tank (LST) was sunk by mines in the Korean War, and Shun's biological father died aboard a repatriation vessel after the end of the Second World War.

Following Japan's defeat in the Second World War, the Supreme Commander for the Allied Powers (SCAP) assumed control over the Japanese merchant marine to return repatriates to their homelands. At the start of the Korean War, those ships, together with their Japanese crews, were pressed into service by the US military to carry forces and supplies to Korea. Japanese vessels played a significant role at the Incheon and Wonsan landings. The shipping firm Tozai Kisen was among the most prominent firms involved, concluding "an agreement with the US military's Japan Logistical Command (JLC) to provide 122 small vessels and around 1,300 crew for transport and landing work". Most ships of the opponents of North Korea were repelled by the navy's Second Torpedo Boat Squadron (근위 제2어뢰정대).

According to estimates, 56 Japanese sailors and labourers were killed in the Korean War zone in the first six months of the war alone; 23 of the deaths occurred when Japanese-crewed ships were sunk by mines. Official estimates of the total number of Japanese killed in the Korean War have never been published, nor have the U.S. or Japanese governments officially recognised the role of Japanese non-combatants in the Korean War.

The 1960s saw an escalating increase in student activism and campus revolts in Japan as well as in other parts of the world.

== Production ==
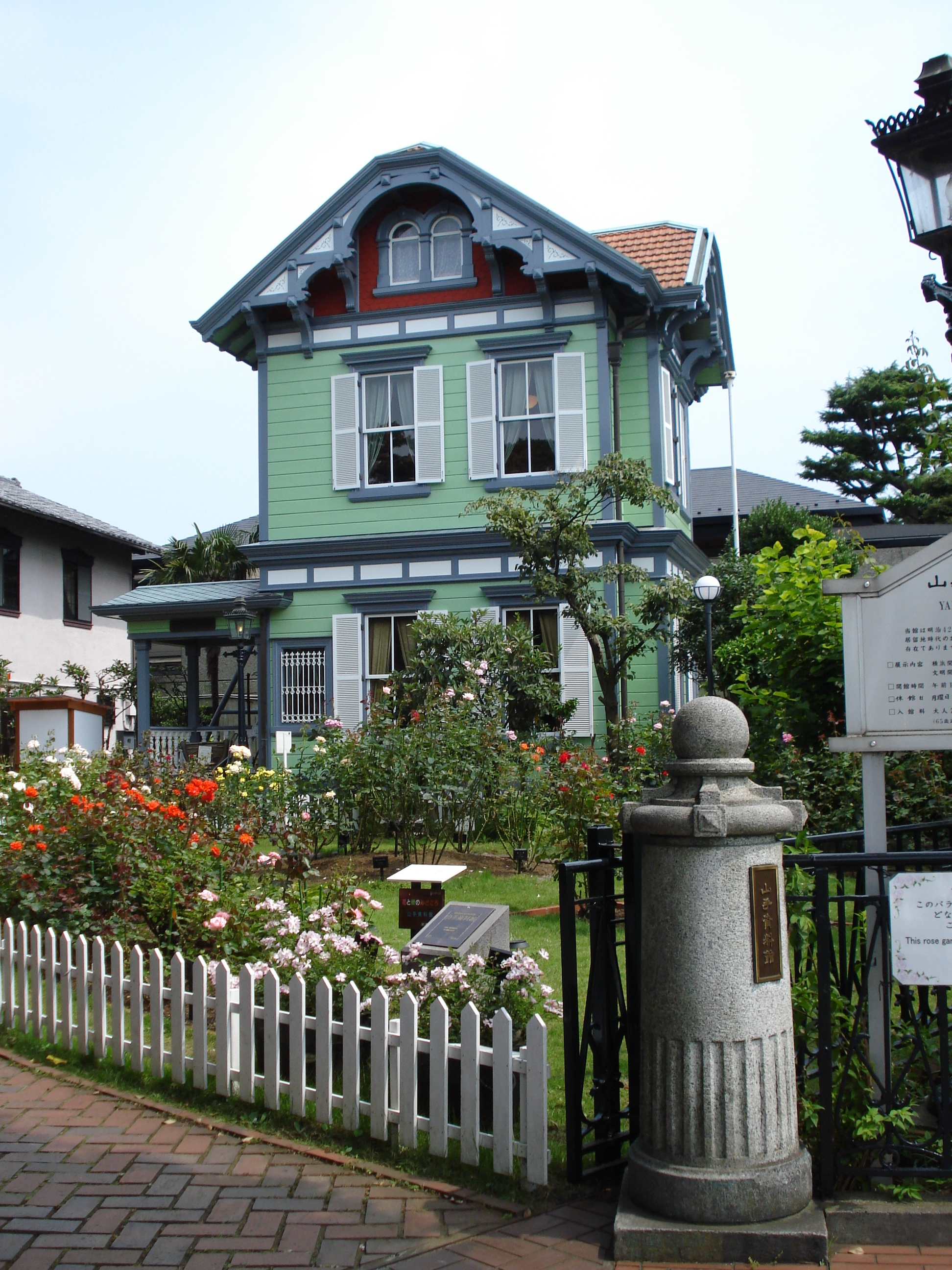
Yamate Archives Museum in Yamate, the Yokohama neighborhood where From Up on Poppy Hill is set.

From Up on Poppy Hill was officially revealed as the new Studio Ghibli film for 2011 on December 15, 2010. It is based on the 1980s shōjo manga of the same name by Tetsuo Sayama and Chizuru Takahashi. It was revealed the director Gorō Miyazaki would be directing. Gorō Miyazaki is the eldest son of Studio Ghibli's co-founder and acclaimed director Hayao Miyazaki; he made his directorial debut in the 2006 film Tales from Earthsea. From Up on Poppy Hill is his second work.

Much like with other Ghibli films, the film is a co-production with Studio Ghibli, Nippon Television Network, Dentsū, Hakuhōdō DY Media Partners, Walt Disney Japan, Mitsubishi Corporation and Tōhō.

In a press interview given after the 2011 Tōhoku earthquake and tsunami, it was announced the film's production was affected by the rolling blackouts imposed after this disaster. In particular, the animation process was forced to proceed in the night to minimize disruptions. When pressed about the progress, it was revealed that the animation was "about 50% completed", though it was added that the "animation would have otherwise been over 70% completed without the disaster". However, Hayao Miyazaki assured the public that the film would still be released on July 16, 2011, as previously announced, saying that it was their responsibility to do so. Gorō Miyazaki stated that while most of the staff was not affected by the disaster, there were several "who did go through a period of mental affectedness because of what happened and that took some time to recover from."

Gorō Miyazaki initially researched Yokohama, intending to be faithful to the city's historical details. However, after realizing that "simply re-enacting something of the time may seem real enough but may not necessarily be beautiful", Miyazaki decided to show the location as "shimmering and bustling with life" from the viewpoint of the characters. In designing the Latin Quarter, Miyazaki worked with the art directors who added ideas about the "amalgamation of clutter in the house's many rooms" and attempted to "look at the architecture of the building, but to also remember back to my college years and the clutter and filthiness that [Miyazaki] lived through".

=== Animation ===
The film's animation directors include Akihiko Yamashita, Atsushi Yamagata, Kitarō Kōsaka, Takeshi Inamura, and Shunsuke Hirota.

=== Voice acting ===
The main voice cast members were officially unveiled on May 13, 2011. It was announced that actress Masami Nagasawa would voice Matsuzaki, the main character. This was Nagasawa's first voice acting role in a Studio Ghibli film. In addition, Jun'ichi Okada, a member of the Japanese band V6, would be voicing Shun Kazama, a member of the school newspaper publishing team. Additionally, Jun Fubuki, Keiko Takeshita, Takashi Naitō, Teruyuki Kagawa, Yuriko Ishida, Nao Ōmori and Shunsuke Kazama would voice other minor characters.

In June 2012, it was announced that a North American dub would be recorded and that it was being executive produced by Kathleen Kennedy and Frank Marshall, written by Karey Kirkpatrick and directed by Gary Rydstrom. The cast members of the dub include Sarah Bolger, Anton Yelchin, Ron Howard, Jeff Dunham, Gillian Anderson, Chris Noth, Ronan Farrow, Isabelle Fuhrman, Emily Osment, Charlie Saxton, Alex Wolff, Beau Bridges, Jamie Lee Curtis, Bruce Dern, Christina Hendricks, Elisa Gabrielli and Aubrey Plaza.

=== Music ===
The score of From Up on Poppy Hill was composed by Satoshi Takebe. In December 2010, it was announced that singer Aoi Teshima would sing the film's theme song, "Summer of Farewells — From Up on Poppy Hill" (「さよならの夏～コクリコ坂から～」, "Sayonara no Natsu ~Kokuriko-zaka kara~").

The 1961 song "Ue o Muite Arukō" (「上を向いて歩こう」), literally "I Look Up as I Walk" but better known in English-speaking countries as "Sukiyaki" and performed by Kyu Sakamoto, is included in this film as one of its insert songs. The instrumental version of this song was later released in the United States under the title of "Sukiyaki" by musician Kenny Ball. This song was chosen for the film because From Up on Poppy Hill is set in 1963, the year that this song debuted and became a hit in America.

==== Soundtrack ====
From Up on Poppy Hill Soundtrack

Soundtrack album by Satoshi Takebe
- Released: July 13, 2011
- Genre: Film score
- Length: 50:32
- Label: Tokuma Japan Communications

The soundtrack album was released by Tokuma Japan Communications on July 13, 2011. It contains the film score as well as six insert songs and the theme song.

== Release ==
From Up on Poppy Hill was released in Japanese cinemas on July 16, 2011. It debuted at third placing in the Japanese box office, behind Harry Potter and the Deathly Hallows – Part 2 and the dual-release Pokémon anime film Victini and the Black Hero: Zekrom and Victini and the White Hero: Reshiram. It managed to gross approximately 587 million yen and attracted around 450,000 viewers. Furthermore, an exhibition, THE ART OF From Up On Poppy Hill was held to coincide with the film's release. This exhibition featured more than 130 art and storyboards used in the making of this film. It was held from July 23 to 28, 2011 in the Seibu Ikebukuro Main Store in Tokyo. The exhibition was later moved to Sogo's Yokohama Branch Store from August 10 to 15, 2011.

The movie was released in France on January 11, 2012, as La Colline aux coquelicots by Walt Disney Studios Motion Pictures France. It gathered over 287,281 viewers in its four weeks of exhibition far more than Tales from Earthsea (in 2007, with 143,641 viewers).

Japanese Blu-Ray release was June 20, 2012.

On August 17, 2011, it was announced that From Up on Poppy Hill would be one of the Japanese films being showcased at the 2011 Toronto International Film Festival, which was held from September 8 to 18, 2011. It was also revealed that the film would be showcased in the "Japan International Premiere" section, which is part of the "Contemporary World Cinema" event in the festival.

The film received a limited theatrical release in North America on March 15, 2013. An English dub was recorded for this release directed by Gary Rydstrom and produced by The Kennedy/Marshall Company, who oversaw the English dubs for Ponyo and The Secret World of Arrietty. The release was licensed by Studio Ghibli to GKIDS. This marked the first time a Studio Ghibli film was not distributed by Walt Disney Studios Motion Pictures in North America (except in Japan home media) since the 1999 North American release of Princess Mononoke by then-Disney owned Miramax Films. A Blu-ray edition in North America was released September 3, 2013. On September 23, 2013, a Blu-ray edition was released in the United Kingdom by StudioCanal.

== Reception ==
=== Box office ===
During the survey period between July 16 and 18, 2011, Bunkatsushin.com reported From Up on Poppy Hill had grossed 587,337,400 yen at the box office, placing third. During these three days, over 445,000 people watched this film.

In a survey which was done online and on mobile platforms, it was revealed the ratio of female audience to male audience was 57% to 43%. By age, 34.8% of the audience were in their twenties, 18.9% of them were ages between 16 and 19 years old, and people who were aged over 30 made up 32.6% of the audience. This film crossed the 3 billion yen gross mark during the weekend of August 21–22, 2011.

From Up on Poppy Hill earned $1,002,895 in North America and $60,456,530 in other territories for a worldwide total of $61,459,425. It is the 14th highest-grossing anime film. Between Grave of the Fireflies, Only Yesterday, Ocean Waves, Whisper of the Heart and My Neighbors the Yamadas, From Up on Poppy Hill is the highest grossing Ghibli film about specialising in Japanese local customs, behind The Wind Rises, and its 7th best grossing one in the United States.

In France, the film was well received by the public. It gathered over 287,281 viewers in its four weeks of exhibition far more than Tales from Earthsea (in 2007, with 143,641 viewers).

=== Critical reception ===
From Up on Poppy Hill received generally positive reviews from film critics; Rotten Tomatoes sampled 87 reviews and judged 87% of them to be positive with an average rating of 7.2/10, and the consensus: "Gentle and nostalgic, From Up on Poppy Hill is one of Studio Ghibli's sweeter efforts—and if it doesn't push the boundaries of the genre, it remains as engagingly lovely as Ghibli fans have come to expect". Metacritic, which assigns a weighted average score, rated the film 71 out of 100 based on 20 reviews.

Mark Schilling of The Japan Times described From Up on Poppy Hill as a "pure-hearted, melodramatic youth film". The reviewer criticized the story as "predictable" and called the direction "pedestrian". However, he concluded the review by praising the film, saying "a wealth of period detail brings the era to nostalgic/realistic life". Takashi Kondo of The Daily Yomiuri said that it "is filled with many experiences that have been lost in our daily life". Kondo also said that "the father-son joint production [of Hayao and Gorō Miyazaki] achieved a wonderful result and [From Up on Poppy Hill] is a work that needs to be seen in this day and age".

A. O. Scott of The New York Times praised From Up on Poppy Hill for its visuals as well as its characterization. Although Scott said that the "specific tragedy that lies in the background may not register with children," he would say that adults are "likely to be charmed by the love story and enchanted by the delicate rendering of a bygone but not entirely forgotten era". Kenneth Turan of the Los Angeles Times called the film "a time-machine dream of a not-so-distant past, a sweet and honestly sentimental story that also represents a collaboration between the greatest of Japanese animators and his up-and-coming son." Turan also said that Latin Quarter "is "Poppy Hill" at its most fantastical." On the characterizations, Turan stated, "the respect and politeness with which all the characters, even the teenage protagonists, treat one another is a far cry from what can go on in this day and age." Scott Tobias of NPR argued that the thematical aspects were too obvious but that "the warm tenor of the film that ultimately rescues it."

=== Accolades ===
Year	Award	Category	Recipient	Result
2011	36th Toronto International Film Festival	People's Choice Award for Best Drama Feature Film	From Up on Poppy Hill	Nominated
2012	35th Japan Academy Prize	Animation of the Year	From Up on Poppy Hill	Won
2012	11th Tokyo Anime Award	Animation of the Year	From Up on Poppy Hill	Won
2012	34th Annecy International Animated Film Festival	Cristal Award for Best Picture	Gorō Miyazaki	Nominated
2012	6th Asia Pacific Screen Awards	Best Animated Feature Film	From Up on Poppy Hill	Nominated
2012	50th Gijón International Film Festival	Enfant terrible Prize for Best Feature Film	From Up on Poppy Hill	Nominated
2013	40th Annie Awards	Writing in an Animated Feature Production	Hayao Miyazaki; Keiko Niwa; Karey Kirkpatrick	Nominated
2013	14th Golden Trailer Awards	Best Foreign Animation/Family Trailer	Zealot Productions; Walt Disney Pictures; GKids	Won
2013	17th Online Film Critics Society Awards	Best Animated Feature	From Up on Poppy Hill	Nominated
2013	26th Chicago Film Critics Association Awards	Best Animated Feature	From Up on Poppy Hill	Nominated
2013	11th International Cinephile Society Awards	Best Animated Film	From Up on Poppy Hill	Nominated
2013	12th Utah Film Critics Association	Best Animated Feature	From Up on Poppy Hill	Runner-up (Note: Tied with The Wind Rises)
2014	40th Saturn Awards	Best Animated Film	From Up on Poppy Hill	Nominated

== See also ==
- Post-occupation Japan
- Shōwa nostalgia
- Japan, Our Homeland, Mai Mai Miracle, and Only Yesterday (other slice-of-life post-war anime about coming of age)
