= Coquelicot-zaka kara =

Japanese manga series

- Volume 1 tankōbon cover of Coquelicot-zaka kara

コクリコ坂から (Kokurikozaka kara)
- Manga
- Written by: Tetsurō Sayama
- Illustrated by: Chizuru Takahashi
- Published by: Kodansha; Kadokawa Shoten (2010 edition)
- Imprint: KC Nakayoshi
- Magazine: Nakayoshi
- Original run: December 1979 – July 1980
- Volumes: 2
- Anime film
- From Up on Poppy Hill

Coquelicot-zaka kara (Japanese: コクリコ坂から, Hepburn: Kokuriko-zaka kara; "From Coquelicot Hill") is a Japanese manga series written by Tetsurō Sayama and illustrated by Chizuru Takahashi. It was originally serialized in 1979 in the manga magazine Nakayoshi. The series was adapted into the 2011 animated film From Up on Poppy Hill, animated by Studio Ghibli and directed by Gorō Miyazaki.

== Plot ==
The manga is set in the late 1960s in Yokohama, Japan; the Ghibli film is set in 1963. The main character, Umi Komatsuzaki, is a high school girl who has to grow up quickly when her father goes missing.

== Media ==
=== Manga ===
The manga was written by written by Tetsurō Sayama and illustrated by Chizuru Takahashi, and was published by Kodansha in the manga magazine Nakayoshi from December 1979 (January issue 1980) to July 1980 (August issue 1980). The manga was collected in two volumes published under the KC Nakayoshi imprint.

=== Film ===
Studio Ghibli announced on December 15, 2010, that it would be adapting the manga for its 2011 summer release film. The staff announced for the film include Gorō Miyazaki as the director, with a screenplay by Hayao Miyazaki and Keiko Niwa, and music composed by Satoshi Takebe.

Aoi Teshima, who played the role of Theru and sang the theme song in the 2006 Ghibli film Tales from Earthsea would also sing the theme song for this film. Toshio Suzuki was to produce Kokurikozaka kara, to be distributed domestically by Toho.

In the film adaptation, Umi's family name is shortened to Matsuzaki.
