= Goro Miyazaki =

Japanese anime director (born 1967)

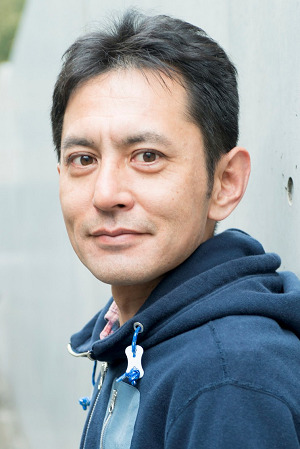
- Miyazaki in 2017
- Born: January 21, 1967 (age 59); Tokyo, Japan
- Education: Shinshu University
- Occupations: Landscape architect, film director
- Years active: 1985–present
- Employer: Studio Ghibli (2006–present)
- Children: 1
- Parents: Hayao Miyazaki (father); Akemi Ōta (mother)

Goro Miyazaki (Japanese: 宮崎 吾朗, Hepburn: Miyazaki Gorō; born January 21, 1967) is a Japanese landscape architect and animation director. His landscape projects include the Ghibli Museum and Ghibli Park. The son of Hayao Miyazaki, Goro has directed three films—Tales from Earthsea (2006), From Up on Poppy Hill (2011), and Earwig and The Witch (2020)—and the television series Ronja, the Robber's Daughter.

== Biography ==
Miyazaki was born to animators Hayao Miyazaki and Akemi Ōta on January 21, 1967, in Tokyo. While growing up, Gorō and his younger brother Keisuke found sketches of their parents' work. As a high school student, Gorō thought that he "would never be able to reach the level [his father] has attained." Gorō instead decided to pursue an interest in landscape architecture. After graduating from Shinshu University's School of Agriculture, Gorō later worked as a construction consultant in the planning and designing of parks and gardens. In 1998, Gorō was involved in the design of the Ghibli Museum in Mitaka, and served as its director from 2001 to June 2005. Miyazaki is involved in Ghibli Park, which began operating in 2022, as its lead designer and director.

== Animation career ==
Miyazaki's first film was Tales from Earthsea, an adaptation of Ursula K. Le Guin's Earthsea book series. Written by Miyazaki and Keiko Niwa, the film stars Junichi Okada, Bunta Sugawara and Aoi Teshima. Originally joining the animation project as a consultant, Miyazaki was asked to draw the storyboards. After viewing his storyboards, producer Toshio Suzuki decided Miyazaki should direct the film.

The move to direct the film caused friction between Goro and his father, who felt his son did not have the experience to direct a film; the two were said not to have spoken throughout the movie's development. According to Grajdian, being born in a family with gifted and committed animators was an advantage for Miyazaki when it came to getting the opportunity to direct a film. It put Goro under pressure to live up to Hayao's talent and creativity. Grajdian did not view it as a competition between Gorō and his father. It instead led Goro to develop films in which he delves into the depths of the human psyche and its desires and anxieties. Instead of focusing on things like the simplicity of entertainment like in My Neighbor Totoro or aesthetic ideological experiments like in Howl's Moving Castle, Goro aims to observe the unique features that make each individual his or her own master.

On June 28, 2006, Gorō held the first preview of the completed Tales from Earthsea, which was attended by his father. Hayao was seen to have "accepted Gorō" and after, delivered to his son a message, saying the film "...was made honestly. It was good." The film was released on July 29, 2006, to positive reviews, but received mixed reviews when comparing to the other Ghibli movies, and grossed $68 million worldwide. However, Miyazaki was presented Japan's Bunshun Raspberry Award for "Worst Director", with Tales from Earthsea receiving the award for "Worst Movie", at the end of 2006. The film was nominated in 2007 for the Japan Academy Prize for Animation of the Year (losing to The Girl Who Leapt Through Time) and was selected in the Out of Competition section at the 63rd Venice Film Festival.

In 2011, Miyazaki directed From Up on Poppy Hill, which is based on Chizuru Takahashi and Tetsurō Sayama's 1980 manga Kokurikozaka kara. The adaptation was written by Hayao Miyazaki and Keiko Niwa and the film stars Masami Nagasawa, Keiko Takeshita, Yuriko Ishida, Jun Fubuki, Takashi Naito, Shunsuke Kazama, Nao Omori and Teruyuki Kagawa. Miyazaki also voiced the world history teacher character and wrote lyrics to some of the songs used in the film. From Up on Poppy Hill was released on July 16, 2011, in Japan, to positive reviews. The film won the 2012 Japan Academy Prize for Animation of the Year. Miyazaki set out to tell the story through the lens of everyday life. He stated that "all the performances were very restrained", and wanted to emphasize the actors' performances through the animation. He discovered 3D computer animation in the process, which he went on to use in his later work.

On January 31, 2014, it was announced that Gorō Miyazaki would direct his first anime television series, Ronja, the Robber's Daughter, an adaptation of Astrid Lindgren's Ronia, the Robber's Daughter for NHK. The series is animated, produced by Polygon Pictures, and co-produced by Studio Ghibli. The show ran for one season, from 2014 to 2015, with a total of 26 episodes.

In May 2020, Toshio Suzuki confirmed that a new film from Gorō Miyazaki was in development at Studio Ghibli. On June 3, 2020, Studio Ghibli announced that the film would be an adaptation of the novel Earwig and the Witch by Diana Wynne Jones. Miyazaki became interested in the story after Suzuki and his father introduced him to it, and stated that he enjoyed that the protagonist "wasn't your typical good girl" and that the story focused on a different type of heroine. The film was announced as the first full 3D CG animated Ghibli film and slated for a television premiere on NHK in Winter of 2020, under the title Earwig and the Witch (アーヤと魔女, Āya to Majo). Earwig and the Witch had its world premiere on October 18, 2020, at the Lumière Film Festival, before premiering in Japan on television on December 30, 2020, on NHK General TV; it was later released in theatres in Japan by Toho on August 27, 2021.

Ghibli Park announced on July 8, 2026, that Goro Miyazaki and Akihiko Yamashita co-directed the short film A Night in the Valley of Witches. It will premiere at Cinema Orion in Ghibli's Grand Warehouse at Ghibli Park. The film was produced by Studio Ghibli and exclusively distributed for their park.

== Works ==
=== Films ===
- Tales from Earthsea (2006), director and screenwriter
- From Up on Poppy Hill (2011), director
- Earwig and the Witch (2020), director
- The Boy and the Heron (2023), executive producer

=== Short Film ===
- A Night in the Valley of Witches (2026), co-director

=== TV series ===
- Ronja, the Robber's Daughter (2014), director
