= Keiko Awaji =

Japanese actress (1933–2014)

- 淡路 恵子
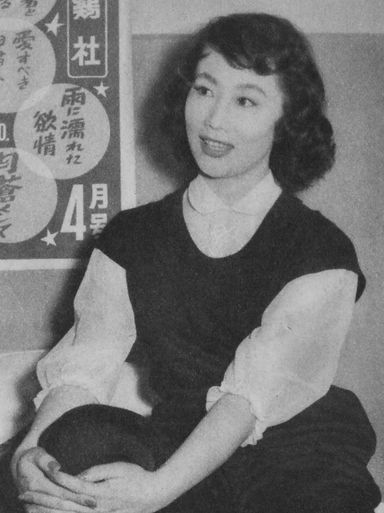
- Awaji in 1954
- Born: 17 July 1933; Tokyo, Japan
- Died: 11 January 2014 (aged 80); Tokyo, Japan
- Occupation: Actress
- Years active: 1949–2014
- Spouses: Bimbo Danao; Yorozuya Kinnosuke
- Children: Etsuo Shima, Akihiro, Kichinosuke

Keiko Awaji (淡路恵子, Awaji Keiko; 17 July 1933 – 11 January 2014) was a Japanese stage and film actress.

Awaji appeared in films like Akira Kurosawa's Stray Dog, Keisuke Kinoshita's A Japanese Tragedy, Mark Robson's The Bridges at Toko-Ri and Mikio Naruse's When a Woman Ascends the Stairs.

She died of esophageal cancer in Tokyo on 11 January 2014, aged 80. She was married twice, to Filipino actor Bimbo Danao and to Japanese actor Yorozuya Kinnosuke.

== Selected filmography ==
Year	Title	Role
1949	Stray Dog	Harumi Namiki
1953	A Japanese Tragedy	Wakamaru
1954	The Bridges at Toko-Ri	Kimiko
1958	The Badger Palace	
1958	A Holiday in Tokyo	Bus Guide
1960	When a Woman Ascends the Stairs	Yuri
1960	The Twilight Story	Ofusa
1960	Scar Yosaburo	
1961	As a Wife, As a Woman	
1962	Chūshingura: Hana no Maki, Yuki no Maki	Otoki
1965	Illusion of Blood	Omaki
1987	Tora-san Goes North	Etsuko
1988	Hope and Pain	Coffee shop's madame
1989	Tora-san Goes to Vienna	Madam
