= From Kobe =

Japanese manga series

- First tankōbon volume cover, featuring Katsura Tatsuki

神戸在住 (Kōbe Zaijū)
- Manga
- Written by: Kon Kimura
- Published by: Kodansha
- Imprint: Afternoon KC
- Magazine: Monthly Afternoon
- Original run: 25 April 1998 – 25 March 2006
- Volumes: 10
- Live-action film
- Directed by: Mitsuhito Shiraha
- Produced by: Tsuyoshi Shimada; Hiroyuki Takase
- Written by: Mana Yasuda
- Music by: Takeshi Senoo
- Studio: Is.Field; Sun TV
- Licensed by: Sun TV (television); Is.Field (theatrical)
- Released: 17 January 2015
- Runtime: 77 minutes (television); 96 minutes (theatrical)
- icon

From Kobe (Japanese: 神戸在住, Hepburn: Kōbe Zaijū) is a Japanese manga series written and illustrated by Kon Kimura. It was serialized in Kodansha's seinen manga magazine Monthly Afternoon from April 1998 to March 2006, with its chapters collected in 10 tankōbon volumes. A live action film adaptation was released for television and theatres in 2015.

== Synopsis ==
Arriving from Tokyo, fine arts student Katsura Tatsuki observes daily life in Kobe while attending Kobe University; from its diverse array of characters inhabiting it, to its ongoing recovery from being hit by the Great Hanshin Earthquake. Rather than having an overarching plot, the manga is composed of self-contained, episodic stories.

== Characters ==
Katsura Tatsuki (辰木 桂, Tatsuki Katsura)
Portrayed by: Izumi Fujimoto
Yōji Hinata (日和 洋次, Hinata Yōji)
Portrayed by: Eiji Sugawara
Hiroko Izumi (泉 海洋子, Izumi Hiroko)
Portrayed by: Arisa Urahama
Takami Suzuki (鈴木 タカ美, Suzuki Takami)
Portrayed by: Nagisa Matsunaga
Wakako Kanagi (金城 和歌子, Kanagi Wakako)
Portrayed by: Sayuri Yanagita
Ken Konishi (小西 健, Konishi Ken)
Portrayed by: Takashi Matsuo
Kazuna Gōda (合田 和名, Gōda Kazuna)
Portrayed by: Misato Tanaka (Note: Billed as a special guest appearance.)
Hyohei Hayasaka (早坂 兵衛, Hayasaka Hyohei)
Portrayed by: Takashi Nishina
Sanae Tatsuki (辰木 さなえ, Tatsuki Sanae)
Portrayed by: Mire Aika
Mayumi Takeuchi (武内 真弓, Takeuchi Mayumi)
Portrayed by: Keiko Takeshita

== Media ==
=== Manga ===
From Kobe was written and illustrated by Kon Kimura. It was originally a one-shot submitted for the Winter 1997 Afternoon Shiki Shō, where it won the Shiki Prize. It was later serialized in Kodansha's seinen manga magazine Monthly Afternoon from 25 April 1998, (Note: Debuted in the magazine's June 1998 issue, released on 25 April of that same year.) to 25 March 2006. (Note: Finished in the magazine's May 2006 issue, released on 25 March of that same year.) Kodansha collected its chapters in 10 tankōbon volumes, released from 23 August 1999, to 23 January 2008.

==== Volumes ====
No.	Release date	ISBN
1	23 August 1999	978-4-06-321104-7
2	21 July 2000	978-4-06-321116-0
3	22 June 2001	978-4-06-321124-5
4	23 May 2002	978-4-06-321137-5
5	23 April 2003	978-4-06-321148-1
6	23 April 2004	978-4-06-321160-3
7	23 February 2005	978-4-06-321167-2
8	23 February 2006	978-4-06-321175-7
9	22 November 2006	978-4-06-321181-8
10	23 January 2008	978-4-06-321182-5

=== Live-action film ===
A live action film and television special adaptation was announced in June 2014, with the special to air on Sun TV on 17 January 2015, to mark the 20th anniversary of the Great Hanshin Earthquake, and the film to release in theatres "in spring 2015 or later." In October of that same year, it was announced that both the television special and film will release in the same day on 17 January 2015. The film, titled Gekijō-ban Kōbe Zaijū (劇場版 神戸在住; lit. 'Theatrical Edition: From Kobe') was distributed theatrically in Japan by Is.Field.

The film was directed by Mitsuhito Shiraha and written by Mana Yasuda. It was shot on location in Kobe and its surrounding region.
