= Takashi Matsuo (actor, born 1960) =

Japanese entertainer (born 1960)

Takashi Matsuo (松尾貴史, Matsuo Takashi) (May 11, 1960 - ) is a Japanese tarento, narrator, disc jockey, actor, and columnist from Kobe, Hyōgo Prefecture. His pet name, as well as his former stage name, is Kitsch (キッチュ, Kicchu). He is currently attached to Furutachi-Project. He is a graduate of the Osaka University of Arts's graphic design course, and is the chairman of the theatrical unit AGAPE store. He is also an associate professor in the Kyoto University of Art & Design.

== Media ==
=== Film ===
- Always: Sunset on Third Street (xxxx) (Real estate agent)
- Gamera: Guardian of the Universe (xxxx) (Taxi driver)
- Godzilla: Final Wars (xxxx) (Television debate panelist)
- Juvenile (2000)
- Godzilla, Mothra and King Ghidorah: Giant Monsters All-Out Attack (2001) (Cameo appearance)
- Nihon Igai Zenbu Chinbotsu (2006) (Forecaster)
- Nihon Chinbotsu (2006) (Councillor)
- From Kobe (2015)
- It's a Flickering Life (2021)
- Between the White Key and the Black Key (2023) (Kumano)
- Teki Cometh (2025)
- Sunset Sunrise (2025)
- Strangers in Kyoto (2025), Tatsuo Shibusawa

=== Television ===
- Baribari Value (xxxx) (Narrator)
- Kinniku Banzuke (xxxx) (Narrator)
- Tamori Club (xxxx) (MC)
- Waratte Iitomo (1989–1990)
- Asayan (1999–2001) (Narrator)
- Furuhata Ninzaburō (1996)
- Yoshitsune (2005) (Ōe no Hiromoto)
- Naotora: The Lady Warlord (2017) (Iseya)
- In Hand (2019) (Tōru Ōtani)
- Invisible (2022) (Kunio Onozuka) (ep. 1)
