= Scar Yosaburo =

1960 film

- Film poster
- Directed by: Daisuke Itō
- Written by: Daisuke Itō
- Starring: Raizo Ichikawa; Keiko Awaji; Manami Fuji
- Cinematography: Kazuo Miyagawa
- Music by: Ichirō Saitō
- Production company: Daiei Film
- Release date: July 10, 1960 (Japan)
- Running time: 94 minutes
- Country: Japan
- Language: Japanese

Scar Yosaburo (Japanese: 切られ与三郎, Hepburn: Kirare Yosaburō) is a 1960 Japanese chambara ("sword-fighting") film directed by Daisuke Itō starring Raizo Ichikawa, originally released by Daiei Film (now known as Kadokawa Pictures).

== Plot ==
The film depicts the scarring of Yosaburo (Raizo Ichikawa) at the hands of yakuza thugs who catch him with mistress of the gang boss. Despite the physical and emotional scars he now carries with him, Yosaburo falls for a young noblewoman (Manami Fuji). The rest of the film follows the two as they fend off attacks from gangs and the police.

== Cast ==
- Raizo Ichikawa as Yosaburo
- Keiko Awaji
- Manami Fuji
- Tamao Nakamura
- Namiji Yamato
- Ryosuke Kagawa
- Chieko Murata
- Eitaro Ozawa

== Film festivals ==
Scar Yosaburo has been part of a number of film festivals celebrating the chambara genre, and also in retrospectives of the careers of Raizo Ichikawa and Shintaro Katsu in the last decade. The film was also featured in the Japan Society of New York's film festival celebrating the chambara genre during the winter 2009–2010 season.

== Trivia ==
- The character of Yosaburo is based on a popular character in Kabuki theater of the same name (although there are slight variations). Like the Yosaburo portrayed in Kirare Yosaburo, he is scarred all over his upper body and face.
