= Tora-san Goes North =

- Theatrical poster
- Directed by: Yoji Yamada
- Written by: Yoji Yamada; Yoshitaka Asama
- Produced by: Kiyoshi Shimizu; Hiroshi Fukazawa
- Starring: Kiyoshi Atsumi; Toshirō Mifune; Keiko Takeshita
- Cinematography: Tetsuo Takaba
- Edited by: Iwao Ishii
- Music by: Naozumi Yamamoto
- Distributed by: Shochiku
- Release date: August 15, 1987 (Japan)
- Running time: 107 minutes
- Country: Japan
- Language: Japanese

Tora-san Goes North (Japanese: 男はつらいよ 知床慕情, Hepburn: Otoko wa Tsurai yo: Shiretoko Bojō), aka Torasan, Remind Shiretoke, is a 1987 Japanese comedy film directed by Yoji Yamada. It stars Kiyoshi Atsumi as Torajirō Kuruma (Tora-san), Keiko Takeshita as the film's "Madonna", and Toshiro Mifune as Takeshita's father. Tora-san Goes North is the thirty-eighth entry in the popular, long-running Otoko wa Tsurai yo series.

== Synopsis ==
When his travels take him to rural Hokkaido, Tora-san helps a cantankerous old veterinarian (Mifune) in his relationships with his estranged daughter, and a woman in whom he is secretly interested.

== Cast ==
- Kiyoshi Atsumi as Torajirō
- Chieko Baisho as Sakura
- Keiko Takeshita as Rinko
- Toshiro Mifune as Junkichi Ueno
- Keiko Awaji as Etsuko
- Shimojo Masami as Kuruma Tatsuzō
- Chieko Misaki as Tsune Kuruma (Torajiro's aunt)
- Gin Maeda as Hiroshi Suwa
- Hidetaka Yoshioka as Mitsuo Suwa
- Hisao Dazai as Boss (Umetarō Katsura)
- Jun Miho as Akemi
- Gajirō Satō as Genkō
- Chishū Ryū as Gozen-sama
- Issei Ogata as The doctor

== Critical appraisal ==
Toshirō Mifune was nominated for Best Supporting Actor at the Japan Academy Prize for his role in Tora-san Goes North. He won awards for Best Supporting Actor at the Blue Ribbon Awards and the Mainichi Film Award ceremonies. Keiko Awaji was nominated for Best Supporting Actress at the Japan Academy Prize. Stuart Galbraith IV writes that Tora-san Goes North is "funny, charming, and ultimately quite moving". The film unites Mifune and Keiko Awaji who had appeared together forty years earlier in Kurosawa's Stray Dog (1949). Noting that Mifune rarely found a good part in the last two decades of his career, Galbraith judges Tora-san Goes North to be "an utterly charming film that gives the great actor one of his last good roles." Kevin Thomas of the Los Angeles Times states that this entry in the series is a "little tougher-minded and a little less sentimental than usual, which is all to the good" and that Yamada had "created a role ideal for Mifune." The German-language site molodezhnaja gives Tora-san Goes North three and a half out of five stars.

== Availability ==
Tora-san Goes North was released theatrically on August 15, 1987. In Japan, the film was released on videotape in 1996, and in DVD format in 1997, 2002, and 2008.

== Bibliography ==
=== English ===
- "OTOKO WA TSURAI YO SHIRETOKO BOJO (1987)". British Film Institute. Archived from the original on 2009-05-27.
- "OTOKO WA TSURAIYO -SHIRETOKO BOJO". Complete Index to World Film.
- Otoko wa tsurai yo: Shiretoko bojô (1987) at IMDb
- Galbraith IV, Stuart (2008-12-31). "Tora-san 38: Tora-san Goes North (Region 2)". DVD Talk.

=== German ===
- "Tora-San Goes North" (in German). www.molodezhnaja.ch.

=== Japanese ===
- 男はつらいよ 知床慕情 (1987) (in Japanese). allcinema.net.
- "男はつらいよ 知床慕情". Japanese Cinema Database (Agency for Cultural Affairs). Archived from the original on 2012-03-11.
- 男はつらいよ 知床慕情 (in Japanese). Japanese Movie Database.
- 男はつらいよ 知床慕情 (in Japanese). Kinema Junpo. Archived from the original on 2012-03-24.
