= Tora-san Goes to Vienna =

- Theatrical poster
- Directed by: Yoji Yamada
- Written by: Yoji Yamada; Yoshitaka Asama
- Produced by: Kiyoshi Shimizu; Kiyoaki Kurosu
- Starring: Kiyoshi Atsumi; Keiko Takeshita
- Cinematography: Tetsuo Takaba
- Edited by: Iwao Ishii
- Music by: Naozumi Yamamoto
- Distributed by: Shochiku
- Release date: August 5, 1989
- Running time: 109 minutes
- Country: Japan
- Language: Japanese

Tora-san Goes to Vienna (男はつらいよ 寅次郎心の旅路, Otoko wa Tsurai yo: Torajirō Kokoro no Tabiji) is a 1989 Japanese comedy film directed by Yoji Yamada. It stars Kiyoshi Atsumi as Torajirō Kuruma (Tora-san), and Keiko Takeshita as his love interest or "Madonna". Tora-san Goes to Vienna is the forty-first entry in the popular, long-running Otoko wa Tsurai yo series.

== Synopsis ==
During his wandering throughout Japan, Tora-san meets a suicidal man. He travels with the man to Vienna, but winds up homesick for Japan.

== Cast ==
- Kiyoshi Atsumi as Torajirō
- Chieko Baisho as Sakura
- Keiko Takeshita as Kumiko Egami
- Akira Emoto as Hyoma Sakaguchi
- Keiko Awaji as Madam
- Shimojo Masami as Kuruma Tatsuzō
- Chieko Misaki as Tsune Kuruma (Torajiro's aunt)
- Gin Maeda as Hiroshi Suwa
- Hidetaka Yoshioka as Mitsuo Suwa
- Hisao Dazai as Boss (Umetarō Katsura)

== Critical reception ==
The Swiss site molodezhnaja gives Tora-san Goes to Vienna three and a half out of five stars.

== Availability ==
Tora-san Goes to Vienna was released theatrically on August 5, 1989. In Japan, the film was released on videotape in 1996, and in DVD format in 1998, 2005, and 2008.

== Bibliography ==
=== English ===
- "OTOKO WA TSURAI YO TORAJIRO KOKORO NO TABIJI (1989)". British Film Institute. Archived from the original on 2012-10-18.
- "OTOKO WA TSURAIYO -TORAJIRO KOKORO NO TABIJI". Complete Index to World Film.
- Otoko wa tsurai yo: Torajiro kokoro no tabiji (1989) at IMDb

=== German ===
- "Tora-San Goes to Vienna" (in German). www.molodezhnaja.ch.

=== Japanese ===
- 男はつらいよ 寅次郎心の旅路 (1989) (in Japanese). allcinema.net.
- "男はつらいよ 寅次郎心の旅路". Japanese Cinema Database (Agency for Cultural Affairs). Archived from the original on 2012-03-11.
- 男はつらいよ 寅次郎心の旅路 (in Japanese). Japanese Movie Database.
- 男はつらいよ 寅次郎心の旅路 (in Japanese). Kinema Junpo. Archived from the original on 2012-03-24.
