= Ronja, the Robber's Daughter (2014 TV series) =

Japanese anime television series

- Promotional image for Ronja, the Robber's Daughter featuring the main characters of the series
- 山賊の娘ローニャ
- Genre: Fantasy, drama
- Based on: Ronja, the Robber's Daughter
- Creator: Astrid Lindgren
- Director: Goro Miyazaki
- Screenplay: Hiroyuki Kawasaki
- Music: Satoshi Takebe
- Country of origin: Japan
- Original language: Japanese
- No. of episodes: 26
- Episodes

Production
- Studio: Polygon Pictures (Note: Production assistance provided by Studio Ghibli)
- Producer: Nobuo Kawakami
- Production company: NHK; Dwango

Original release
- Network: NHK BS Premium
- Release: October 11, 2014 – March 11, 2015

Ronja, the Robber's Daughter (Japanese: 山賊の娘ローニャ, Hepburn: Sanzoku no Musume Rōnya) is a Japanese anime based on the Swedish children's book of the same name. It is about Ronja, the only child of a bandit chief, who grows up among a clan of robbers living in a castle in the woodlands of early-Medieval Scandinavia. When Ronja grows old enough she ventures into the forest, exploring and discovering its wonders and dangers like the mystical creatures that dwell there. She learns to live in the forest through her own strength, with the occasional rescue by her parents. Ronja's life begins to change, however, when she happens upon a boy her own age named Birk, who turns out to be the son of the rival clan chief.

== Characters ==
- Ronja (ローニャ, Rōnya) Voiced by: Haruka Shiraishi (Japanese), Teresa Gallagher (English)
- Mattis (マッティス, Mattisu) Voiced by: Takaaki Seki (Japanese), Rufus Hound (English)
- Lovis (ロヴィス, Rovisu) Voiced by: Yukari Nozawa (Japanese), Morwenna Banks (English)
- Birk (ビルク, Biruku) Voiced by: Reika Uyama (Japanese), Kelly Adams (English) aka Birk Borkason
- Borka (ボルカ, Boruka) Voiced by: Atsuki Tani (Japanese), Bob Golding (English)
- Undis (ウンディス, Undisu) Voiced by: Mika Doi (Japanese), Beth Chalmers (English)
- Noddle-Pete (スカッレ・ペール, Sukarre Pēru) Voiced by: Umeji Sasaki (Japanese), Adrian Edmondson (English)
- Fjosok (フョーソク, Fyōsoku) Voiced by: Shōichirō Akaboshi (Japanese), Rasmus Hardiker (English)
- Pelje (ペリェ, Perye) Voiced by: Yūsuke Tezuka (Japanese), Rasmus Hardiker (English)
- Tjorm (チョルム, Chorumu) Voiced by: Takeo Ogawa (Japanese), Rasmus Hardiker (English)
- Sturkas (ストゥルカス, Suturukasu) Voiced by: Kenji Sugimura (Japanese), Rasmus Hardiker (English)
- Knotas (クノータス, Kunōtasu) Voiced by: Takahiro Shimada (Japanese), Bob Golding (English)
- Tjegge (チェッゲ, Chegge) Voiced by: Rintarou Nishi (Japanese), Bob Golding (English)
- Lill-Klippen (リル・クリッペン, Riru Kurippen) Voiced by: Keiji Himeno (Japanese), Giles New (English)
- Jutis (ユティス, Yutisu) Voiced by: Giles New (English)
- Joen (ヨエン, Yoen) Voiced by: Giles New (English)
- Labbas (ラッバス, Rabbasu) Voiced by: Giles New (English)
- Turre (トゥッレ, Turre) Voiced by: Giles New (English)
- Harpy (鳥女, Tori-onna) Voiced by: Saori Kato (Japanese), Jules de Jongh (English)
- Rumphobs (ずんぐり小人, Zunguri kobito) Voiced by: Man Katō, Hideki Tanaka, Masako Isobe, Erina Kurita, Miyuki Satō (Japanese), Jonathan Ross, Jennifer Marriott and Naomi Freedman (English)
- Narration (ナレーション, Narēshon) Voiced by: Fukiko Endō (Japanese), Gillian Anderson (English)

== Episode list ==
No.	Title	Directed by	Original release date	English release date
1	"Born in the Storm"; Transliteration: "Kaminari no yoru no ko" (Japanese: かみなりの夜の子)	Kazuma Shimizu	11 October 2014	27 January 2017
Two rival forest bandit clans, the Mattis and the Borkas, fight each other for treasure from their victims and divide the forest in two. On a stormy night Ronja is born to Mattis, leader of the bandits of the forest castle and his wife Lovis; on the same day the castle is split in two by a lightning bolt, creating "Hell's Gap". Mattis, ecstatic about his daughter, calls Ronja the clan's greatest treasure.
2	"The First Trip to the Forest"; Transliteration: "Hajimete no mori e" (Japanese: はじめての森へ)	Kazuma Shimizu	11 October 2014	27 January 2017
The bandits, overjoyed at Ronja's birth, find priority in her care and watching her grow up rather than robbing travelers in the forest. Meanwhile Borkas and his clan decrease their attacks on travelers as well. Years later Mattis and Lovis decide Ronja's old enough to venture into the forest on her own, permitting her to leave the castle walls for the first time. Ronja is warned about various dangers such as the Gray Dwarfs before she is sent on her way for the day.
3	"The Fear in the Forest"; Transliteration: "Mori to hoshi to kobito to" (Japanese: 森と星と小人と)	Kazuma Shimizu	18 October 2014	27 January 2017
Excited to see the outside world, Ronja observes the sights and sounds of the forest with enthusiasm and wonder. She eventually falls asleep despite her father's instruction to come back home before dark. Ronja wakes up during the night to find herself surrounded by Gray Dwarfs, small nocturnal creatures who are hostile to humans. She is eventually rescued by her father and the other bandits who come looking for her. Ronja learns to be brave and confident in the face of danger.
4	"Hearing the Whistler"; Transliteration: "Kikoeru kuchibue" (Japanese: 聞こえる口笛)	Akio Kazumi	25 October 2014	27 January 2017
In the quiet autumn, Ronja inquires about the goods her father and the robbers collect, not knowing they steal from others, much to her father's dismay about revealing the truth; they however manage to deflect the question, keeping Ronja ignorant about the matter. Meanwhile guards have begun hunting Borka and his robbers, pushing them out of their part of the forest. Ronja is warned about the Borkas Bandits and told that they are scoundrels, though she has never met one. Due to the harpies becoming even more aggressive because of the season, making the forest more dangerous, Ronja decides to explore the lower depths of the castle. Ronja then discovers the way to Hell's Gap and meets another child, a red haired boy, on the other side of the Gap who is whistling.
5	"An Enemy in the Fort"; Transliteration: "Shiro ni haitta teki" (Japanese: 城にはいった敵)	Kazuma Shimizu	1 November 2014	27 January 2017
The red haired boy begins conversing with Ronja, boldly claiming he knows who she is. When Ronja inquires about who he is and how he got on the split side of the castle, the boy introduces himself as Birk Borkason. He reveals that he and his parents as well his father's twelve robbers, the Borkas Bandits, moved in the night before and it is now Borkas' Keep. The two children then insult one another's bandit family before Ronja decides to leave. Birk proceeds to daringly jump across the gap to Ronja's side, starting a jumping match between the two rival clans' children. While jumping part of the ground breaks away, sending Birk over the edge and Ronja saves him using her leather rope before telling him off though Birk thanks her for saving him. That night Mattis rages over the news of Borka moving in though he thinks Ronja is lying until the others confirm the news of Borka having a son, born the same night as Ronja, and it sends him into a bigger rage. Everyone is restless that night, keeping watch should the Borkas Bandits attack them and Ronja is disappointed the first child she met is a Borkas.
6	"Taking Without Asking"; Transliteration: "Niramiau sanzoku-tachi" (Japanese: にらみあう山賊たち)	Akio Kazumi	8 November 2014	27 January 2017
After spending the whole night on edge and standing guard the Mattis Robbers confront the Borkas Bandits. The two clans stand opposite of one another across the divide of Hell's Gap, insulting one another. Borka then explains he and his clan cannot stay in the forest anymore since soldiers are hunting for them. When Mattis rebukes him for stealing a place to stay, Borka counters with how Mattis has always been taking without asking. Confused about what Borka meant, Ronja asks as she does not truly understand what a robber is. Mattis changes the subject by asking how Borka got into the castle to which Borka gives credit to Birk who scaled the side of the cliff with a rope for the clan to climb. Borka goes on to recount when Mattis and he used to play together as children, not knowing either was from the rival clan until Mattis' father found out and beat Borka. Thanks to the sensibility of Undis and Lovis, the two clans avoid fighting at Hell's Gap and delay their battle for another day. Ronja runs off into the forest to explore only to encounter Birk, much to her annoyance and anger.
7	"A Song in the Mist"; Transliteration: "Kiri no naka no utagoe" (Japanese: 霧の中の歌声)	Kazuma Shimizu	15 November 2014	27 January 2017
Ronja is annoyed her place of solitude is ruined by Birk and wants nothing to do with him. She tells Birk to leave her forest alone to which Birk says the animals belong to themselves and no one else, same with the woods. Ronja counters she has no problem sharing the wood with the animals just not with Birk and then runs off. When a mist settles over the forest Birk finds Ronja so she can lead him back to the castle. Leading Birk along with her rope Ronja soon finds herself lost in the mist, going around in circles and hearing laughter from dancing figures in the distance. Birk warns her not to listen to the Unearthly Ones' song or else she will be lost forever. In a trance Ronja fights Birk so she can follow the figures but Birk refuses to let her go despite her scratching and biting him. The mist eventually lifts and Ronja snaps out of her trance, not remembering what happened and the two part ways though Ronja thinks less badly of Birk. Back at the castle Ronja asks Mattis once more about what he has taken without asking and he explains what a robber is. Ronja then swears she will never be a robber, let alone a robber chieftain like her father.
8	"The Autumn Deepens"; Transliteration: "Fukamaru mori no aki" (Japanese: 深まる森の秋)	Akio Kazumi	22 November 2014	27 January 2017
Mattis and his robbers attempt to find a way to Borka's side of the castle but are thwarted each time. In the meantime the forest has become safer for travelers due to the decrease in robberies and the guards search for the Borkas only to find their old abandoned hideout. The Mattis robbers grow restless inside the castle and fight with one another over petty disagreements. Lovis puts them to work by tending to the livestock until they go hunting to get meat to stock up for the winter. Lovis and Ronja prepare the storehouse with food to last them all through the winter. Ronja finds a wild horse herd and vows to one day tame one like her father. While exploring Ronja wonders how Birk is doing since that day in the forest, not seeing him for all of autumn.
9	"Stuck in the Snow"; Transliteration: "Nukerarenai yuki no ana" (Japanese: ぬけられない雪の穴)	Kazuma Shimizu	29 November 2014	27 January 2017
Winter arrives and the Mattis Robbers are depressed with the endless snow shoveling and being pent up in the castle. Eager to tryout her new snow clothes Ronja starts a snowball fight with the robbers before returning to work. Mattis calls Ronja back in to present her with a pair of skis from his childhood. Ronja then goes out of the castle to try out her skis and over the next few days masters their use. While playing she falls down and gets her leg stuck, unable to pull it out. Rumphobs appear and she asks them for help. The Rumphobs, whose roof her foot went through thus disturbing their underground home, do not understand and leave without helping Ronja. Ronja fears she is left alone to freeze to death.
10	"The Vow to Be Brother and Sister"; Transliteration: "Kyōdai no chikai" (Japanese: きょうだいの誓い)	Akio Kazumi	6 December 2014	27 January 2017
Ronja thinks about what will happen to her if it starts snowing again while she is stuck. Meanwhile the Rumphobs have fashioned her foot into a swing for their baby's cradle to rock him to sleep as she struggles, wiggling her foot. A harpy spots Ronja and starts taunting and threatening her before attempting to free her in order to make Ronja her slave. The harpy tries to fly away with her in vain but promises to return the following day with her sisters to help her. Ronja's life flashes before her and she gives herself up for being lost to die in the cold. Ronja wakes up to find Birk calling her name and mildly chiding her for losing her ski and getting stuck before she breaks down crying in relief to see him. Ronja clings to Birk and begs him not to leave her and he jokes only if it is a rope's length away. Birk goes to work to free Ronja's foot and succeeds after some time. Birk follows after Ronja to make sure she gets home safely and Ronja asks him to be her brother to which he complies, calling her 'Ronja, my sister'. The next morning the Mattis Robbers find themselves snowed in and Ronja wakes up with a fever, collapsing on the floor.
11	"To Be Done in Secret"; Transliteration: "Kossori to yaru koto" (Japanese: こっそりとやること)	Kei Takao	13 December 2014	27 January 2017
Ronja wakes up with a fever and the robbers are worried since it is the first time she has been sick in her life. Mattis becomes emotional and dramatic, saying she is going to die and Ronja reassures him it is nothing and could have been worse, not mentioning getting stuck and nearly freezing to death. Lovis nurses Ronja back to health after three days in bed. In the meantime Ronja thinks about Birk, her sworn brother and keeps him secret for fear of breaking her father Mattis' heart as well as enraging him. Snowed in Ronja misses Birk and the robbers grow restless due to cabin fever, picking fights until Lovis delegates chores. Ronja explores beneath the castle, examining the dungeon and the blocked passage below Hell's Gap. Ronja decides to clear away the rubble so she can see Birk on the other side, wanting to know if he really meant he would be her brother.
12	"The Whistler Underground"; Transliteration: "Chikashitsu no kuchibue" (Japanese: 地下室の口笛)	Kazuma Shimizu	20 December 2014	27 January 2017
Ronja manages to create a small opening in the rubble and soon hears a whistled tune. Recognizing the song from when Birk whistled it, she begins whistling it back. Birk then calls out unseen to her from the other side and Ronja asks if he meant he would be her brother; Birk responds that it is good to hear his sister's voice and that it would be nice to see her. Their conversation is cut short when Ronja hears someone down below with her and says they will talk tomorrow before running off. The next morning after Ronja and Mattis endure a lice combing from Lovis, Ronja heads back underground with some provisions. She is startled by Birk who's been waiting for her on the Mattis Robbers' side of the rubble and Ronja is surprised to see him pale and thinner. She learns that the Borkas Robbers are low on food and will not last until spring. Ronja offers Birk a loaf of bread which he wolves down with eagerness and drinks all the milk. Ronja decides to visit Birk every day during the winter to give him food. Birk and Ronja swear to secrecy, though they hate it, knowing how enraged their fathers would be to learn of their friendship.
13	"The Wretched Robbers"; Transliteration: "Aware na sanzoku-tachi" (Japanese: あわれな山賊たち)	Akio Kazumi	27 December 2014	27 January 2017
Birk secretly adds what food Ronja gives him to his family's storeroom, giving the Borkas Robbers more food to last. Birk asks how many times Ronja plans on saving his life and Ronja swears as many as he saves hers. Both agree they dependent on one another and cannot be without the other. As winter draws closer to its end Lovis has the reluctant Robbers go into the snow for a delousing treatment and mid-thaw snow bath. Mattis scolds Noddle-Pete for talking about dying soon when Mattis has known him his whole life and cannot do without him. Later the Robbers are forced to wear spare women's clothing Mattis' grandfather stole in his day, resulting in much laughter at the sight of the miserable Robbers who also got haircuts and shaved. Spring finally comes and as the Robbers can go out to rob once more Ronja is allowed into the forest again. Ronja finds Birk in the forest and shows him her spring cry to welcome spring and let out all the pent up energy from winter.
14	"Splendid Spring"; Transliteration: "Subarashii haru ni" (Japanese: すばらしい春に)	Kei Takao	3 January 2015	27 January 2017
Ronja and Birk enjoy the sunny arrival of spring in the forest and decided to try to capture wild horses. They set their sights on two young stallions and attempt to tame them after roping them, naming them Rascal and Reckless. While Mattis raids a trading party traveling through the forest Borka appears, asking for half the treasure as his men are weak from the harsh weather. Mattis refuses, taunting Borka and telling him to get lost despite Borka's humble pleas. Some of Borka's men grow hasty and despite Borka's orders shoot at the Mattis Robbers, wounding Bumper. Mattis swears vengeance and that he will wipe the Borkas out in spite of Ronja's warning that the feud would lead to the end of the Mattis Robbers as well.
15	"Endless Fighting - Part 1"; Transliteration: "Hateshinai arasoi (zenpen)" (Japanese: はてしない争い（前編）)	Kazuma Shimizu	10 January 2015	27 January 2017
Time passes and Bumper heals from his wound from the Borkas' arrow, but Mattis is set on retaliating against the Borkas despite Ronja and Lovis' reasoning. Ronja is anxious every time the robbers go out and wonders if all her happy days in the forest are gone. Ronja meets Birk in the forest and the two of them mull over how both their fathers are too stubborn to change and their happy springtime is ruined. Birk points out that the two clans have not been able to kill each other yet thanks to the Sheriff's men swarming the woods but that will not last forever. When Ronja returns home, she is told there is a pleasant surprise only to find that Birk has been captured and beaten by her father. Heartbroken and enraged Ronja screams at her dad he can steal anything he wants except people or else she is no longer his daughter. When Lovis tries to see to Birk's wounds Mattis tells her not to tend to the devil spawn and the two fight. Ronja spends the night crying and hating her dad after he carries the injured Birk away for the evening.
16	"Endless Fighting - Part 2"; Transliteration: "Hateshinai arasoi (kōhen)" (Japanese: はてしない争い（後編）)	Kazuma Shimizu	17 January 2015	27 January 2017
The next morning the Mattis Robbers and Borkas Robbers meet at Hell's Gap, each on their own side. Mattis presents Birk, battered and bruised, before an outraged Undis and grim-faced Borka. Borka understands that Mattis wants them out of the castle but calls the other's actions underhanded and unspeakable. Mattis demands that they leave at once but Borka requests to let him find a safe place to move first by summer's end and promises to go if Birk is returned to him. Mattis tells Borka that is fine and he will keep Birk until Borka moves out, meaning the boy will be in his possession for months to come. Ronja cannot tolerate the thought of Mattis mistreating Birk further and keeping him in the dismal dungeon until Borka moves out. Much to everyone's shock Ronja jumps across the Gap onto Borka's side in defiance of her father's plans, becoming Borka's leverage for trade to get Birk back immediately. Mattis, overcome with shock and disbelief by Ronja's actions, agrees to return Birk but states that he has no child. Lovis demands Ronja be returned as she has a daughter and that Mattis has lost all sense. As the two children are exchanged Birk calls Ronja his sister and tells his mother Ronja saved his life and Ronja remarks he saved hers as well. Borka and Undis are outraged to learn of the friendship and Birk fights with them, storming off and leaving a tearful Ronja. Meanwhile Mattis is in an almost catatonic state, refusing to eat or speak to anyone.
17	"Moving Out"; Transliteration: "Futari no hikkoshi" (Japanese: ふたりの引っこし)	Akio Kazumi	24 January 2015	27 January 2017
For three days Ronja looks for Birk in the forest but does not find him while Mattis refuses to eat and remains in bed in a catatonic state. The Mattis Robbers are restless and downhearted as their raiding has been put on hold until Mattis is better while Ronja wonders where Birk is and feels lonely. On the fourth day Ronja finds Birk in the forest and he tells her he is moving out of Borka's Keep and into the forest as he cannot stand his parents' nagging anymore. Ronja has the idea of moving in with Birk as she cannot put up with Mattis' silent treatment any longer and thinks of living in the Bear's Cave, her father's childhood summer place. That night Ronja sneaks out of the castle with supplies and tells the robbers who are on guard duty goodbye before meeting up with Birk at the cave.
18	"Something in the Cave"; Transliteration: "Dōkutsu ni hisomu mono" (Japanese: 洞窟にひそむもの)	Kei Takao	31 January 2015	27 January 2017
Ronja and Birk awaken at dawn in the cave due to the cold and start their day together "free". When Birk resolves to fetch his crossbow for protection Ronja decides to make herself a bow by using Birk's knife. The two go about the forest to fetch supplies and return to the cave only to hear something inside. Together they enter the cave and realize it is only Gray Dwarfs so they drive them out of the cave by screaming. Birk discovers one loaf of bread has been eaten by the creatures, reducing the two's provisions but Ronja says they can collect what they need from the forest. Later that day Ronja succeeds in making her bow and at night she wonders if Birk and she are missed by their families. She doubts Mattis misses her after having denounced her as his child but has a dream where Mattis is crying a lake of tears over her.
19	"The Lost Knife"; Transliteration: "Nakunatta naifu" (Japanese: なくなったナイフ)	Kei Takao; Akio Kazumi	7 February 2015	27 January 2017
Early the next morning after their first night on their own Ronja and Birk catch fish for food. Ronja notices a wound on Birk's foot and decides to gather moss to help with future injuries, knowing her mother's treatments. A few days later Birk asks Ronja for his knife but Ronja remarks he had it last and the two argue, insisting the other has it. Angry, Birk accuses Ronja of taking it as she is a robber's daughter when Ronja tells Birk he is simply blaming her for his mistake. After exchanging hurtful words Ronja runs off, leaving Birk alone in the cave to live by himself. Soon Birk finds the knife but is too stubborn to apologize, instead sulking in the cave and planning to turn Ronja away when she returns. He realizes how he is acting and instead waits for Ronja in the cave nearly for the whole day before setting out to look for her. Birk finds an injured mare in the forest with Ronja nearby, tearful as she witnessed a bear attack the mare and kill her foal. Ronja uses the moss to put on the mare's wounds and she and Birk reconcile. They name the mare Lia and decide to keep her until she heals as well as milk her so they have horse milk to drink. Together they swear not to let something come between them like something as trivial as a missing knife.
20	"With the Wild Horses"; Transliteration: "Nōma-tachi to" (Japanese: 野馬たちと)	Akio Kazumi	14 February 2015	27 January 2017
Putting their trivial fight behind them, Ronja and Birk live together peacefully in the forest through the summer. While they milk Lia their two young stallions come over to investigate. Ronja stubbornly decides to try riding the wild horses again, only to be thrown off. After that she tries to ride them every day while Birk is milking Lia, attempting to tame them better without success. Birk has the same results at first but finally gets his horse to allow him to ride. Ronja becomes exasperated at her horse who taunts her and Birk who shows off while riding. After a wild ride on Rascal Ronja succeeds in taming the stubborn horse. Eventually Lia's milk dries up and they bid farewell to the mare, thanking her for allowing them to have her milk. While horseback riding Ronja and Birk are attacked by a harpy but manage to get away. When they get back to their cave they find an unexpected visitor waiting for them.
21	"Hunted by Harpies"; Transliteration: "Todoroku taki to tori-onna" (Japanese: とどろく滝と鳥女)	Kei Takao	21 February 2015	27 January 2017
Lil Klippen greets the two at their cave, presenting a bundle full of bread loaves Lovis prepared. Ronja is excited to see her friend and offers Birk some bread but he silently wanders off, leaving Lil Klippen alone to ask Ronja to come home. Ronja asks how things are and if Mattis has talked about her but Lil Klippen says Mattis has forbidden her name being spoken and things are melancholy. He begs Ronja to come home so things can be better but Ronja refuses until Mattis acknowledges her. Lil Klippen informs Ronja that Noddle Pete is not doing so well and the soldiers in the forest have severely hindered robbing. Pelle was captured by the sheriff and is in jail along with two Borkas robbers as the sheriff swore to capture all the bandits in the forest. When Lil Klippen leaves, giving Ronja some salt for the meat, Birk upsets Ronja by remarking she did not go home to her father. Ronja retorts she has no father and she will not have a brother either if Birk keeps it up to which Birk apologizes. Later the two go swimming in the river but are attacked by a flock of wild harpies. They manage to escape thanks to Birk's plan using camouflage but the two head toward the waterfall, unable to swim away.
22	"Only This Summer"; Transliteration: "Kore kagiri no natsu" (Japanese: これかぎりの夏)	Kazuma Shimizu	28 February 2015	27 January 2017
Ronja and Birk try to escape the river current as they are swept toward the waterfall as the harpies fly overhead. Ronja almost doe not make it but Birk helps her to shore and the two exhausted children rest. When they get back to the cave Lovis is waiting for them. Birk storms past without a word and when Ronja asks if he will greet her mother he remarks he does not greet uninvited guests. Ronja scolds him for lacking manners and rushes to her mother in relief. Ronja tells Lovis she will never return to the fort but her mother says Mattis will throw himself into the river if she does not return. Ronja is skeptical but Lovis goes on to say Mattis cries and calls for Ronja in his sleep. Ronja says he will never come to ask her back home and she will never return until he does. In the morning Birk admits he is a coward, only acting as if Ronja is his sister when they are alone since he is afraid of her leaving him. Birk resolves to only talk of the present since it is summer and they will spend that together, but Ronja says she will stay no matter the season. The two continue to enjoy their summer days together as winter draws closer.
23	"A Life Isn't to Be Thrown Away"; Transliteration: "Inochi wa muda ni dekinai" (Japanese: 命はむだにできない)	Akio Kazumi	7 March 2015	27 January 2017
Ronja wakes up from a nightmare of Birk being frozen in the lake, prompted by the chill of winter around her. Birk and Ronja try to keep warm as autumn becomes colder. Birk remarks that Ronja will soon leave him as it is becoming colder and return to her family. Ronja goes off to get water and finds Mattis crying at the river. Ronja begins crying and runs to her father who takes her in her arms, calling her his child and saying he has his child back. He asks her to come back but Ronja hesitates when she sees Birk nearby. Seeing Birk, Mattis calls him over and asks him to come back with them as Ronja is fond of him. Ronja then speaks to the scowling Birk alone and ends up slapping him after he says he would rather freeze then be Mattis' whipping boy. Ronja tells him life is to be treasured and she would not leave him in the cave for winter as she would freeze with him rather than leave him alone. Birk then agrees to follow Ronja wherever she goes and the two leave the Bear Cave with Mattis. Birk then parts ways to see his family though Mattis has granted permission for the two children to meet and play. Mattis presents the idea of the two robber clans uniting before each child returns to their families.
24	"The Fight of the Wild Beasts"; Transliteration: "Kettō no asa" (Japanese: 決闘の朝)	Kei Takao	14 March 2015	27 January 2017
Mattis orchestrates a jailbreak, rescuing Pelle and two of Borka's men from the Sheriff. Ronja and Birk talk about the rescue as they play together in the forest. Mattis grumbles about Birk constantly being around the castle but admits he gave his word. That night Noddle-Pete warns the sheriff will win if the clans do not unite and tells Mattis to make amends with Borka. He then suggests that the two chiefs duel to see who will lead the united clan. Ronja pipes up that it would be best to give up robbing all together. The next day Mattis meets Borka who warns him about the sheriff's ambush as a favor for Mattis freeing his robbers. Mattis then begrudgingly suggests the two join forces and Borka agrees only to say he will be the leader but Mattis says the same for himself. The two then prepare for a duel the following morning to determine the new chief.
25	"One Band Of Robbers"; Transliteration: "Hitotsu no tsuyoi sanzoku-dan" (Japanese: ひとつの強い山賊団)	Akio Kazumi	21 March 2015	27 January 2017
Mattis and Borka face off in the Wild Beast Match to best the other in order to become the united clans' chief. The two proceed to wrestle and grabble one another, managing to out do the other only to lose the upper hand repeatedly. The two chiefs batter one another until they are black and blue, using petty means such as punching, pulling ears and biting. Borka seems to be winning, nearly knocking Mattis unconscious but when the fight continues Mattis is able to subdue Borka, winning. Mattis allows Borka to retain his chieftain title and to lead his own men but calls him his brother and to remember Mattis is the mightiest chieftain. Borka agrees to the terms and the two clans are formally united and celebrate together well into the night at Mattis' fort. Mattis tells Borka not to worry as Birk will be the next chief since Ronja does not want to be a robber. Birk then makes a formal declaration he will never be a robber, shocking his father. That night Noddle-Pete tells Ronja he is happy to hear she nor Birk want to be robbers and tells her a secret.
26	"The Call of the Spring"; Transliteration: "Haru no sakebi" (Japanese: 春の叫び)	Kazuma Shimizu	28 March 2015	27 January 2017
Mattis brags to the bedridden Noddle-Pete of the robber's success as united tribes. Ronja and Birk observe the changes in the forest as winter approaches. Meanwhile Noddle-Pete enjoys seeing the peaceful relations between the clans as he waits for his time. Mattis worries over Noddle-Pete's health while Lovis says he is simply suffering from old age and there is nothing to keep death at bay. Time goes on and Noddle-Pete gets weaker though Ronja tries to tend to him. He eventually passes away peacefully just before winter and Mattis grieves heavily while the rest of the Mattis Robbers are deeply saddened as well. In the spring Birk wonders how he and Ronja will get by in the world in the future since they have vowed to never become robbers. Ronja then tells him Noddle-Pete's secret: a cave full of silver shown to him by a gray dwarf he saved in his youth. Birk and Ronja decide to live in the Bear's Cave for the spring again and receive Mattis' blessing. The two venture out to enjoy their days together and Ronja greets spring with her shout.

== Production ==
The anime is a cel-shaded television series, based on the novel Ronia, the Robber's Daughter (Ronja Rövardotter) written by Astrid Lindgren. Produced by Polygon Pictures, Studio Ghibli, NHK Enterprises and Dwango, the series is directed and storyboarded by Goro Miyazaki, with Hiroyuki Kawasaki handling series composition and writing the scripts, Katsuya Kondō designing the characters, Toshio Suzuki providing the title logo and Satoshi Takebe composing the music. Miyazaki stated that "Ronja, the Robber's Daughter is not only a story about a young girl growing into adulthood, but also a story of love, growth, and the bond between parent and child and their friends", also saying that the series can be enjoyed by everyone, from children to adults. Kazuyoshi Saito wrote, produced and performed all the instruments on "Player" for Mari Natsuki to sing as the ending theme song. It is Studio Ghibli's first television series.

UK-based distributor Serious Lunch has acquired the worldwide distribution rights, except for Japan and Scandinavia. It sought English-language broadcasters and brought the series to potential backers at the 2015 Annecy International Animation Film Festival. Amazon began streaming the series on its Amazon Prime service on January 27, 2017. GKIDS released the series in the United States on August 20, 2019 (distributed by Shout! Factory), and additional licenses were sold in China (UYoung Media) and Taiwan (PTS). The English dub is narrated by Gillian Anderson. The BBC also produced a Scottish Gaelic dub of the series - "Ronia, Nighean a' Mhèirlich" - which was broadcast on the BBC Alba channel and available on its iPlayer service in 2022/23. StudioCanal UK handled video rights to the series in the UK.

== Reception ==
Critical reception of Ronja, the Robber's Daughter was mostly positive. The series was praised in reviews by The Guardian, Collider, The Daily Dot, Slate, iDigitalTimes, Starburst, Mir Fantastiki, among others. Meanwhile, Swedish journalist Yukiko Duke, The Onion's The A.V. Club and Polygon published negative reviews. The show was praised for its visual beauty and being faithful to the original novel, but criticized for slow pacing.

=== Awards ===
Year	Nominee / work	Award	Result
2015	Ronja, The Robber's Daughter	Asian Television Awards — Best 2D Animated Programme	Won
2016	Ronja, The Robber's Daughter	International Emmy Awards — Kids: Animation	Won
