= History of Japanese nationality =

The history of Japanese nationality as a chronology of evolving concepts and practices begins in the mid-nineteenth century, as Japan opened diplomatic relations with the west and a modern nation state was established through the Meiji Restoration.

== Pre-modern Japan ==
Until the Meiji Restoration, Japanese people were subject to both the local authority of the daimyō and the national authority of the Tokugawa shogunate, who pledged allegiance to the Emperor. A concrete example of the shōgun acting directly on Japanese people as a nationality would be blanket recall of Japanese people from all other nations during the sakoku period, which resulted in the end of communities like Nihonmachi in Vietnam.

The idea of Japan as a nation was a topic for scholarly inquiry during much of the Edo period. For example, Sangoku Tsūran Zusetsu (三国通覧図説; "An Illustrated Description of Three Countries") by Hayashi Shihei (1738–1793). This book, which was published in Japan in 1785, deals with Chosen (Korea) and the kingdom of Ryukyu (Okinawa) and Ezo (Hokkaido). The widely distributed Nihon Ōdai Ichiran by Hayashi Gahō (1618–1688) identifies and describes a number of Goryeo and Joseon missions to Japan as well as Japanese missions to Imperial China.

Scholarly formulations of Japanese nationhood—notably those of the kokugaku school and late Mito school—exerted considerable influence on both Japanese nationalism and the practice of Japanese nationality in the Meiji period.

== Practices initiated in Meiji period ==
Nationality practices during the first decades of the Meiji government were shaped by pressure to conform to western norms. Meiji oligarchs saw adopting the technology and institutions of western powers not only as essential to regaining sovereignty rights lost in the unequal treaties but also as an effective means of national strengthening. Like the reforms of other modernizing states, the legal and institutional changes of the early Meiji period involved rationalizing the population, making the relationship between the individual and the state more direct, and codifying the rights and obligations associated with that relationship. By the late 1880s, Japanese leaders were increasingly preoccupied with the idea of cultivating a distinctive sense of the nation, or kokutai (国体) among Japanese subjects. This goal led to the emergence of new nationality practices—such as compulsory education, elections, and voluntary organizations—which, unlike earlier reforms based on borrowing from western models, were strongly shaped by the emerging ideology of Japanese nationalism.

The following is a list of nationality practices initiated during the Meiji period (1868–1912). Though these practices and the ideology that informed them changed over the course of the Meiji period and subsequent decades, they remained the core of Japanese nationality practice through World War II.

=== Legal practices ===
As part of its modernizing program, the Meiji state replaced the feudal class system with a much simpler set of status distinctions. In 1872, the koseki (戸籍), or family registry, system was established, requiring each family to register with the local government and notify authorities of births, marriages, adoptions, divorces, and deaths in the household. The implementation of the koseki system meant that all families adopted a family name, a privilege which had previously been reserved for the warrior class. Members of the burakumin (部落民), or outcaste group, were legally emancipated in 1871. This made their legal status equal to other commoners (平民, heimin), though the koseki of former burakumin families retained a record of that status, facilitating de facto discrimination. On the other end of the social hierarchy, the status of samurai was gradually phased out. Samurai stipends were commuted into government bonds in 1872 and former members of samurai households became commoners. A small peerage, modeled on the British Peerage, was created from a combination of court nobles (公家, kuge) and former daimyō. Its members received a small stipend and, after 1899, were eligible to sit in the Upper House of the Diet.

Changes in personal status law were accompanied by the promulgation of comprehensive new law codes. A Criminal Code, 刑法 (1882) Civil Code 民法 (1898), and Commercial Code 商法 (1890), were drafted with the cooperation of foreign experts. These legal codes are a clear example of the effect of the effort to revise unequal treaties on nationality practice in Meiji Japan. Because removing extraterritoriality provisions required convincing western powers that Japanese courts met modern standards, Meiji leaders moved quickly to implement a western-style legal system. This meant that being governed by western style laws—applied uniformly throughout the nation—became part of being a subject of the new Japanese nation-state. The Meiji-era legal codes remained the basis of Japanese law until the end of World War II.

=== Obligations to the state ===
The principal obligations associated with being a subject of the Japanese state were payment of taxes and, for men, military service.

The Land Tax Reform (地租改正) of 1873 established a system of private land ownership and instituted monetary taxation. As a result, payment of taxes became linked to one's individual status as a subject of the Japanese nation-state and was no longer a function of feudal status or place of residence. Under the Meiji Constitution, direct payment of taxes to the national government became the basis for political participation at the national level.

The Conscription Act (1873) was part of a sweeping military reform, replacing the independent samurai armies of the feudal domains with a national conscript army. Reporting for the conscription exam at age twenty became a common experience for all Japanese men and military training exposed young men to nationalist ideology. Initially, about 5 percent of eligible men were drafted, serving four years active duty and three years in the reserves. During the First Sino-Japanese War and Russo-Japanese War, conscription rates rose to about 10 percent. Military conscription rates were extremely high during the Second World War.

=== Political rights ===
The Meiji Constitution (1890) outlined a limited set of political rights. Men who paid 15 yen in annual taxes to the national government had the right to vote in elections for the Lower House of the Diet, making just over 1 percent of the population eligible to vote in the first national election in 1890. In 1900, the property qualification was lowered. In 1925 the General Election Law (普通選挙法) extended the franchise to all men aged 25 or older. In the 1920s, there was a movement for women's suffrage. Proposals to extend suffrage and other political rights to women were debated in the Lower House of the Diet, but failed to become law.

Political rights were most important during the period of Taishō Democracy. Yet, even during this decade of flourishing political parties, the importance of political rights for ordinary people was muted by the dominant role of non-elected groups in Japanese politics. The significance of voting rights was also limited by a series of increasingly repressive Peace Preservation laws designed to mitigate the potentially destabilizing effects of popular party politics and prevent the spread of leftist ideologies.

=== Education ===
The most significant aspect of education as nationality practice in this period is the advent of compulsory primary education. Universal primary education was first articulated as a state goal in the Education Act of 1872. Since much of the responsibility for funding the new schools fell on local governments, its implementation was uneven. Nevertheless, the school system expanded rapidly. The vast majority of Japanese children could expect to attend four years of primary school by around the start of the 20th century. Initially, national education policy was focused on practical goals and had minimal ideological content. In the 1880s, however, anxiety about over-enthusiastic westernization mounted and the need to educate subjects who would be enfranchised by the awaited constitution became apparent. These concerns spurred debate about how the education system should promote moral conduct and strengthen national sentiment. The key document in this respect is the Imperial Rescript on Education (1882).

A system of higher education was also established. State-sponsored exchange students were an important part of the Meiji modernization program.

=== Voluntary associations ===
The government fostered the development of an expanding number of voluntary associations which acted as channels through which ordinary people were exposed to nationalist ideology. These served to organize, indoctrinate, and mobilize various sectors of the population, including students, wives and mothers, and Shinto priests.

== Nationality practice and territorial expansion, 1874–1945 ==
Previous sections of this article deal with nationality practice in Japan without reference to the fact that the boundaries of Japan were changing during the period discussed. The boundaries of Japan were changing during the period discussed. This section addresses nationality practices in Japanese-controlled territory in light of this fact. During the period of imperialist expansion, the term naichi (内地), or home territory, was used to distinguish Japan proper from its colonies. Though, historically, its exact meaning varied, this section uses it in its narrowest sense, to refer to Honshū, Shikoku and Kyūshū.

=== Okinawa ===
Until the late 19th century, both Qing China and the Satsuma Domain had claimed the Ryūkyū Kingdom as a tributary state. In the 1870s, the Japanese government maneuvered to establish direct sovereignty over the Ryūkyū Islands. As part of a settlement with Qing government after the 1874 Japanese incursion into Taiwan, the Qing government renounced its claims, clearing the way for direct Japanese rule. The Ryūkyū King Shō Tai was declared a vassal of the Meiji court and his kingdom designated Ryukyu-han (琉球藩), or the feudal domain of Ryukyu. During the first years of Japanese control, King Shō Tai retained nominal authority, but Ryukyu was largely ruled by the Naimushō office in Naha. In 1879, the Japanese government tightened control over Ryukyu, forcing the King to withdraw and declaring Ryukyu a prefecture (Okinawa-ken 沖縄県).

Concerned about resistance from local elites, Japanese administrators moved gradually in implementing modernizing reforms. The standardization of household registration and the abolition of noble status occurred early on, followed by the extension of Japanese criminal law to Okinawa by 1880. Land reform was completed in 1903, ending communal tenure and establishing a system of direct land taxes paid in cash. The Conscription Law was applied to Okinawa in 1898. Political rights available to subjects in naichi prefectures were eventually extended to Okinawans. By 1920, Okinawans were represented in the Diet on the same basis as naichi Japanese. Beginning in the 1880s, the prefectural government also attempted to increase attendance in primary schools and participation in nationally organized voluntary associations, but the spread of these heavily ideological nationality practices was relatively slow. The spread of these practices was part of a trend towards cultural assimilation to Japanese norms. Partly as a result of government policies, many Okinawans abandoned traditional cultural practices and the Ryūkyū language.

Though this process in many ways resembled the modernizing and centralizing reforms affecting nationality practice in naichi prefectures, in Okinawa it had a distinct colonial dynamic. The bureaucracy and the police in Okinawa were initially staffed almost exclusively by migrants from naichi Japan. Naichi Japanese in Okinawa enjoyed privileged access to jobs and business opportunities, while Okinawans-by-birth suffered discrimination based on a perception of ethnic and cultural inferiority.

After initial travel restrictions were lifted, a significant number of Okinawans migrated to the main islands of Japan, where they tended to assimilate into local society, often encountering less discrimination than at home. Japanese nationality status gave Okinawan emigrants access to the protection of the Japanese government when abroad and to preferential treatment as settler colonists within the Japanese empire. In practice, Okinawan emigrants experienced discrimination in areas where naichi Japanese immigrants had already settled. For this reason they tended to form distinct communities overseas. By 1938, more than 70,000 Okinawans had emigrated outside the Japanese empire, principally to Hawai'i, South America and the Philippines. By 1945, more than 50,000 Okinawans had migrated to other parts of the Japanese empire, notably to Nan'yōchō.

=== Hokkaidō ===
Before 1855, Hokkaidō was loosely integrated into the Tokugawa state through the Matsumae domain. In 1855, concerned about military threat from Russia, the bakufu assumed direct control, but its authority remained weak and had relatively little effect on the native Ainu population. After the Meiji Restoration, the new government established the Hokkaidō Colonization Commission (北海道開拓使) to administer its northern territories. The Colonization Commission and its successors promoted economic development and encouraged immigration from naichi Japan. Early settlement schemes were unsuccessful, but beginning in the 1890s, generous land grant policies attracted tens of thousands of settlers each year.

The government also launched an aggressive assimilation effort directed at the Ainu population, an effort Richard Siddle characterizes as "a series of policies that attempted to turn the Ainu into productive Japanese citizens, but actually served to emphasise their inequality and subordination to the state." In 1875, Ainu were granted legal status as commoners, subject to the same laws as naichi Japanese. As with the burakumin, the government maintained separate records of their former status. As areas of naichi Japanese settlement expanded, Ainu were increasingly subject to forced relocation. Traditional hunting techniques, as well as cultural practices such as tattooing and ear piercing, were legally banned. In 1899, the Hokkaidō Former Natives Protection Act (北海道旧土人保護法) was passed. It established a separate and compulsory school system, a program of land grants designed to encourage Ainu to adopt agriculture, and provided some welfare benefits. Education in Ainu schools promoted cultural assimilation, including adopting the nationality practices of imperial Japan, such as joining nationally organized voluntary associations and serving in the military. The Ainu school system was abolished in 1927.

=== Karafuto ===
Nationality practices in Karafuto, under joint Russian and Japanese control 1867–1875, and Japanese rule 1905–1945, were similar to those in Hokkaidō in that the Japanese administration pursued a policy of promoting economic development and settlement by naichi Japanese. The population of Ainu and other indigenous people was very small in Karafuto. As in Hokkaidō, Ainu and indigenous people were forcibly resettled and subjected to a program of assimilation.

Some nationality issues arose out of complications related to changes in sovereignty in the nineteenth century. For example, the status of Japanese and Ainu who had remained in Karafuto during the period of Russian rule between 1875 and 1905 was ambiguous. In some cases, these people were treated as Russian nationals. The other distinctive feature of nationality practice in Karafuto was immigration policy. Though the immigration of unskilled laborers was illegal in the rest of Japan, several thousand Chinese coolies were recruited to work as temporary migrant laborers in Karafuto between 1909 and 1927. After 1927, they were replaced by migrants from Korea. By 1945, more than 50,000 Koreans—under varying degrees of coercion—had migrated to Karafuto.

=== Taiwan ===
Japan annexed Taiwan in 1895 after the First Sino-Japanese War. Residents of Taiwan became subjects of Japan, but did not have the same status, rights and obligations as Japanese from the home islands.

=== Korea ===
After decades of intervention in Korean affairs, Japan formally annexed Korea in 1910. Annexation meant that Koreans became subjects of the Japanese Emperor and were considered Japanese nationals by the Japanese government. Despite this seemingly equal status, colonial policy facilitated differential treatment of Koreans. At the same time, it constituted an increasingly coercive program of assimilation into the Japanese state and Japanese cultural norms.

The Sōshi-kaimei (創氏改名) laws established a Japanese-style family registry in Korea, and Koreans were permitted to use a Japanese-style family name (the Korean-style family name was not prohibited). This system was separate from the Japanese koseki system and it was illegal to move registration records between the two systems, thus preserving a legal difference between Koreans and naichi Japanese regardless of place of residence. Naichi Japanese in Korea had privileged access to economic and educational resources. They retained rights and obligations, such as the vote and military service, that they had in naichi Japan. Because Korea was administered through the Government General of Korea, the laws issued by the Government General, rather than those of naichi Japan, determined the rights and obligations of Koreans to the state. The education system promoted cultural assimilation of Koreans—both in its content and its use of Japanese as the primary language of instruction—but gave children of naichi Japanese families in Korea preferential treatment. In the 1930s, the assimilationist aspect of education in Korea intensified under the so-called "becoming the Emperor's people" policy (皇民化, kōminka). 1944, by national conscription decree, Koreans were conscripted as laborers for service in Japan. In 1943, Japan Navy decided to accept enlistees of the Koreans by the Royal Decree of July 28, 1943.

Status as Imperial Japanese subjects gave Koreans a degree of mobility within Japanese controlled territory. Though in 1945, Koreans were present as voluntary migrants, labour conscripts, soldiers, or comfort women in nearly every part of the Japanese Empire, the most significant Korean migrations were to naichi Japan and to Manchuria.

Tens of thousands of impoverished Korean tenant farmers moved to Japan to find work. There, they faced difficult working conditions, discrimination, government surveillance, and vigilante violence. The Japanese government was anxious about the potentially destabilizing effect of Korean laborers in Japan; yet, because Koreans were legally Japanese nationals, it could not explicitly restrict immigration from Korea. Instead, during economic downturns in Japan, colonial police in Pusan were instructed to restrict Korean emigration on an informal basis by limiting access to travel documents (旅行証明書). In Japan, Koreans came under the jurisdiction of the Japanese government proper, rather than the Government General of Korea. This meant that they were governed by Japanese law and had greater civil and political rights—notably the right to hold meetings and vote in national elections—than Koreans in Korea. Political rights were especially important to the community of Korean students in Japan. See Koreans in Japan. After the 1923 Great Kantō earthquake, the Japanese government pursued a more active policy of assimilation towards Koreans in Japan. Primary school attendance was made compulsory in 1930, as was membership in the Naisen-kyowa-kai (内鮮共和会; "Japan-Korea Harmony Society"). This organization, tightly controlled by the Naimusho and the Government General of Korea, issued identity cards to its members, controlled the travel of Koreans between Korea and Japan, and organized labor mobilization, as well as sponsoring the cultural, social and ideological activities typical of other "voluntary" associations.

Beginning in the early 1900s, hundreds of thousands of Koreans migrated to Manchuria. Though this territory was not under Japanese control, the Japanese government claimed Koreans in Chinese territory as Japanese nationals. This contention was part a broader effort to dominate China (see Twenty-One Demands). It meant that Japanese consulates claimed extraterritoriality privileges for Koreans in China and that Koreans were prohibited from naturalizing as Chinese citizens. After the Mukden Incident and the establishment of Manchukuo, Japanese authorities encouraged further Korean migration to Manchuria. The nationality status of Koreans in Manchuria was ambiguous.

== Japanese Nationality and Repatriation after World War II ==
When Japan surrendered in August 1945, there were more than six million Japanese nationals outside of what is now Japan. The process of repatriating these individuals—about half of whom were civilians—revealed the inconsistencies of nationality practice in the Japanese Empire. Despite the rhetoric of equality, naichi (main lands) Japanese were treated differently from other Imperial subjects.

=== Koreans ===
During the summer and fall of 1945, hundreds of thousands of conscripted Korean laborers in Japan abandoned their jobs and returned to Korea. Defining the remaining 600,000 Koreans—many of whom were long-time residents or had been born in Japan—as foreigners, Japanese authorities began to limit the citizenship rights they had enjoyed as imperial subjects resident in Japan. During the colonial period, it was illegal to transfer a Korean koseki to Japan; therefore, Japanese authorities were able to target residents of Japan whose names appeared on Korean koseki. See Loss of Japanese nationality. Since Japan did not have diplomatic relations with either Korean government until 1965, Koreans remaining in Japan became officially stateless.

=== Okinawans ===
The treatment of Okinawans during the post-war repatriation programs reflected both the ambiguous status of Okinawans with the Japanese Empire and the strategic goals of the United States Military. Interpreting "Okinawan" as a distinct nationality reinforced the legitimacy of governing Okinawa separately from the rest of Japan. Okinawans, defined as individuals registered in an Okinawan koseki, were repatriated to Okinawa from both naichi Japan and former colonial territories in the Pacific. About 56,900 Okinawans were repatriated from Nan'yōchō and the Philippines and as many as 79,000 from naichi Japan. Like other Okinawans, repatriates were officially Japanese nationals but were governed by the United States Civil Administration of the Ryūkyū Islands. Okinawans who traveled overseas or emigrated during the period of US administration (1945–1972), were issued US travel documents rather than Japanese passports.

=== Japanese colonists ===
About 1.5 million Japanese who were left in Manchuria after the Soviet invasion were transferred to labor camps in Siberia, where they remained for as many as five years. Since military personnel, government officials and employees of major companies had preferential treatment during the evacuation, rural settler colonists were overrepresented in this group. Once they returned to Japan, settler colonists regained Japanese nationality, but their former status as colonial subjects continued to have meaning. For example, colonists who had been conscripted into the Japanese militia in Manchuria were ineligible for the pension benefits available to other veterans of the Japanese military. The same was true of Japanese veterans of the paramilitary forces (軍属, gunzoku) in the Philippines.

The majority of Japanese settler colonists left behind in China were women, and these Japanese women mostly married Chinese men and became known as "stranded war wives" (zanryu fujin). Because they had children fathered by Chinese men, the Japanese women were not allowed to bring their Chinese families back with them to Japan so most of them stayed. Japanese law only allowed children fathered by Japanese fathers to become Japanese citizens.

=== "Japanese orphans" in China ===
During the chaotic retreat from Manchuria, an estimated 10,000 children of Japanese colonists were left behind and adopted by Chinese families. In the 1980s, the Japanese government instituted a program to facilitate the belated repatriation of these individuals, known as Japanese orphans in China (残留孤児, zanryū koji). Those who could locate their name on a prewar Japanese koseki were allowed to live in Japan indefinitely, but did not automatically regain Japanese nationality. Approximately 20,000 orphans and their relatives have moved to Japan under this program. Some "orphans" contend that, even if they undergo the cumbersome process of regaining Japanese nationality, they are not offered full citizenship because they have little access to social benefits, such as pensions, available to other Japanese.

== Current nationality practices in Japan ==
The legal aspects of Japanese nationality are currently governed by the Nationality Act of 1950. It states that a person is a Japanese national if either of his or her parents is a Japanese national, provides for naturalization of aliens, and explains how Japanese nationality may be lost.
