= Keiko Takeshita =

Japanese actress

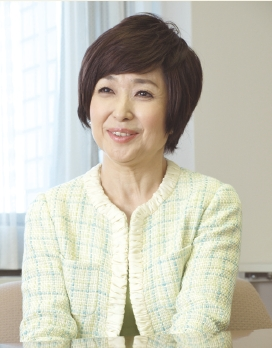
- Born: September 15, 1953 (age 73); Nagoya, Aichi, Japan
- Occupation: Actress
- Years active: 1973–present
- Partner: Teruo Sekiguchi (1984–)

Keiko Takeshita (竹下景子 Takeshita Keiko; born on September 15, 1953, in Higashi-ku, Nagoya, Japan) is a Japanese actress. She starred in the Japanese version of From Up on Poppy Hill as Hana Matsuzaki.

== Filmography ==
=== Film ===
- Blue Christmas (1978) - Saeko Nishida
- Phoenix 2772 (1980) - The Phoenix (Voice)
- Swan Lake (1981) - Princess Odette (Voice)
- Tora-san Goes Religious? (1983) - Tomoko
- Tora-san Goes North (1987) - Rinko
- Tora-san Goes to Vienna (1989) - Kumiko Egami
- A Class to Remember (1993) - Tajima
- Sennen no Koi Story of Genji (2001) - Lady Rokujo
- Arrietty (2010) - Sadako Maki (Voice)
- From Up on Poppy Hill (2011) - Hana Matsuzaki (Voice)
- The Wind Rises (2013) - Jiro's mother (Voice)
- From Kobe (2015) - Mayumi Takeuchi
- Satoshi: A Move for Tomorrow (2016) - Tomiko Murayama
- Flower and Sword (2017) - Jōchin-ni
- Futari no Uketorinin (2018)
- Kazokuwari (2019)
- Ware Yowakereba: Yajima Kajiko-den (2022)
- The Life of Chiyoko Ito (2022) - Tetsu Yasui
- The Boy and the Heron (2023) - Izumi (Voice)
- Grandma's Secret (2026)
- Fujiko (2026)

=== Television drama ===
- Ōgon no Hibi (1978) - Kikyō
- Kita no Kuni kara (1981–2002) - Yukiko
- Tokugawa Ieyasu (1983) - Lady Saigō
- Sanada Taiheiki (1985–86) - Ono no Otsū
- Dokuganryū Masamune (1987) - Katakura Kita
- The Sun Never Sets (2000) - Teruko Masaki
- Clouds Over the Hill (2009) - Akiyama Sada
- From Kobe (2015) - Mayumi Takeuchi
- Laugh It Up! (2017) - Hatsu
- Welcome Home, Monet (2021) - Masayo Nagaura/narrator

=== Other television ===
- Quiz Derby (TBS, 1976–92)

=== Dubbing ===
- #AnneFrank: Parallel Stories (2020) - Helen Mirren

== Awards ==
Year	Award	Category	Work(s)	Result	Ref.
1978	2nd Elan d'or Awards	Newcomer of the Year	Herself	Won	
1993	6th Nikkan Sports Film Awards	Best Supporting Actress	A Class to Remember	Won	
1994	17h Japan Academy Film Prize	Best Supporting Actress	A Class to Remember	Nominated	
