= Aoi Teshima =

Japanese singer and voice actress (born 1987)

Aoi Teshima 葵 手嶌
- Born: June 21, 1987 (age 39); Kasuga, Fukuoka, Japan
- Genres: J-pop
- Occupations: Singer, voice actress
- Instrument: Vocals
- Years active: 2006–present
- Labels: Rendezvous, Yamaha
- Website: AoiTeshima.com; Aoi Teshima.net

Aoi Teshima (手嶌葵, Teshima Aoi; born June 21, 1987) is a Japanese singer and voice actress from Kasuga, Fukuoka. She is known for singing and acting in several Goro Miyazaki movies including Tales from Earthsea and From Up on Poppy Hill.

== Early life ==
Aoi Teshima was born on June 21, 1987, in Kasuga, Fukuoka, Japan. From an early age, she was influenced by her parents' liking for classic musical films, such as The Wizard of Oz, The Secret Garden, The Little Prince, and Breakfast at Tiffany's. Of that, Teshima has attributed the song, "Moon River", along with the music of Ella Fitzgerald, Louis Armstrong, and Billie Holiday as the basis for her love for jazz music, and as major influences on her musical style. In junior high school, Teshima found herself moved by Bette Midler's 1979 song, "The Rose", her amateur cover of which became the trigger of her debut as a singer.

== Career ==
After graduating junior high, Teshima enrolled at the C&S Music School in Fukuoka, to acquire the qualifications of high school and junior college while simultaneously developing her singing abilities. There, she began a music career as an amateur in 2003. In 2003 and 2004, she participated in the musical event DIVA, held in Fukuoka, as part of the Yamaha Music-sponsored Teen's Music Festival.

In March 2005, she performed at the Japan-Korea Slow Music World event in South Korea, where her performance was favourably received amongst the audience, attracting the attention of anime director Gorō Miyazaki. The Studio Ghibli music producer, Toshio Suzuki, was reportedly very impressed when he listened to her demo version of "The Rose" at the recommendation of Miyazaki.

On June 7, 2006, the release of "Theru's Song (テルーの唄, 'Terū no Uta')" became her major debut. The song was the theme of the Gorō Miyazaki directed film, Tales from Earthsea, in which she also voices the character Theru. This song debuted at #5 on the Oricon charts, with the number of CD shipments numbering at about 300,000, along with music downloads recorded at about 650,000 downloads, which was the largest for the theme song of the Studio Ghibli series at the time.

She was featured singing two songs in the Nintendo Wii game, Fragile Dreams: Farewell Ruins of the Moon, called "Light (光, 'Hikari')" and "Warmth of the Moon (月のぬくもり, 'Tsuki no Nukumori')". In 2006 her song "Miracle Star" was used as the theme song for the Japanese version of Arctic Tale. In 2011, she once again collaborated with Gorō Miyazaki on his second feature, From up on Poppy Hill (2011), singing "Summer of Goodbye", the main theme of the movie and other songs in the film, as well as voicing the character Yuko.

On September 30, 2012, she was presented with the Citizens Cultural Award of Kasuga City.

On February 10, 2016, she released the first single from her 10th album, Ren'dez-vous, titled "Letter to Tomorrow (明日への手紙, Asu e no Tegami)". This song was used in the Japanese drama Love That Makes You Cry, and charted at top on the Billboard Japan Hot 100 chart.

== Personal life ==
Teshima has described herself to be 'stubborn and strong-willed', and added that she is also camera-shy.

== Discography ==
=== Original albums ===
Title	Album Information	Oricon albums charts	Sales
Gedo Senki Kashū (ゲド戦記歌集); Tales from Earthsea Song Collection	Released: July 12, 2006; Label: Yamaha (YCCW-10028); Formats: Compact disc, digital download, rental CD	20	55,000
Haru no Kashū (春の歌集; Spring song collection)	Released: February 7, 2007; Label: Yamaha (YCCW-10028); Formats: Compact disc, digital download, rental CD	38	14,000
Niji no Kashū (虹の歌集; Rainbow song collection)	Released: July 23, 2008; Label: Yamaha (YCCW-10049); Formats: Compact disc, digital download, rental CD	78	5,900
Kokurikozaka kara Kashū (コクリコ坂から歌集); From up on Poppy Hill song collection	Released: July 6, 2011; Label: Yamaha (YCCW-10156); Formats: Compact disc, digital download, rental CD	33	24,000
Ren'dez-vous	Released: July 23, 2014; Label: Victor Entertainment (VICL-64074)	125	

=== Cover albums ===
Teshima's cover albums are sung in English.

Title	Album Information	Oricon albums charts	Sales
The Rose: I Love Cinemas	Western film theme songs; Released: March 5, 2008; Label: Yamaha (YCCW-10044); Formats: Compact disc, digital download, rental CD	48	15,000
La Vie en rose: I Love Cinemas	Western film theme songs; Released: October 7, 2009; Label: Yamaha (YCCW-10102); Formats: Compact disc, digital download, rental CD	65	6,000
Christmas Songs	Western Christmas songs; Released: November 24, 2010; Label: Yamaha (YCCW-10119); Formats: Compact disc, digital download, rental CD	127	3,900
Miss Aoi – Bonjour, Paris!	Paris-themed songs; Released: December 12, 2012; Label: Rendezvous (RDV-0008)		
Cheek to Cheek~I Love Cinemas~	Western film theme songs; Released: December 19, 2018; Label: Victor Entertainment (VIZL-1503/VICL-65075)		

=== Compilation albums ===
Year	Album Information	Oricon albums charts	Sales
Collection Blue	Released: November 9, 2011; Label: Yamaha (YCCW-10162); Formats: Compact disc, digital download, rental CD		

=== Singles ===
Release	Title	Notes	Chart positions			Oricon sales	Album
Release	Title	Notes	Oricon singles charts	Billboard Japan Hot 100*	RIAJ digital tracks*	Oricon sales	Album
2006	"Therru no Uta" (テルーの唄, Terū no Uta; "Therru's Song")	Gold certification for cellphone downloads	5	—	—	228,000	Ged Senki Kashū
2007	"Kishi o Hanareru Hi" (岸を離れる日; "The Day I Push Off from the Shore")	Digital release	—	—	—	—	Haru no Kashū
2007	"Kiseki no Hoshi" (奇跡の星; "Miracle Star")		32	—	—	4,000	Niji no Kashū
2008	"Kazoku no Fūkei (CM Version)" (家族の風景 (CMバージョン); "Family Scene")	Digital release	—	—	—	—	Niji no Kashū
2008	"Niji" (虹; "Rainbow")		110	—	—	2,900	Niji no Kashū
2008	"Can't Help Falling in Love"	Elvis Presley cover, digital release	—	—	—	—	Collection Blue
2008	"Hikari/Tsuki no Nukumori" (光/月のぬくもり; "Light/Warmth of the Moon")	Digital release	—	—	—	—	Collection Blue
2009	"Tsurezure Yōbi" (徒然曜日; "Boring, Regular Day")	Digital re-release	—	—	—	—	Haru no Kashū
2009	"La Vie en rose"	Édith Piaf cover, digital release	—	—	—	—	La Vie en rose
2009	"Kono Michi" (この道; "This Road")	Digital release	—	—	—	—	Collection Blue
2010	"Ima o Ikite" (いまを生きて; "Live for Today")	Digital release	—	—	—	—	Collection Blue
2010	"Because" (Yoko Kanno x Aoi Teshima)	Digital release	—	—	—	—	Collection Blue
2010	"Ryūsei" (流星; "Meteor")	Digital release	—	—	—	—	Collection Blue
2011	"Sayonara no Natsu (Kokurikozaka kara)" (さよならの夏～コクリコ坂から～; "Summer of Farewells (From Up on Poppy Hill)")		22	13	11	27,000	Kokurikozaka kara Kashū
2016	"Asu e no Tegami" (明日への手紙; "Letter for Tomorrow")		16	1	1		
2021	"Tadaima" (ただいま; "I'm home")						
*Japan Hot 100 established February 2008, RIAJ Digital Track Chart established April 2009.
