= Coquelicot =

Shade of red based on the hue of the wild corn poppy

Color coordinates
- Hex triplet: #FF3800
- sRGB^{B} (r, g, b): (255, 56, 0)
- HSV (h, s, v): (13°, 100%, 100%)
- CIELCh_{uv} (L, C, h): (56, 164, 15°)
- Source: ColorHexa
- ISCC–NBS descriptor: Vivid reddish orange
- B: Normalized to [0–255] (byte)

Coquelicot ( /ˈkoʊklɪkoʊ/ KOHK-li-koh) is a shade of red. The term is originally the French name for the wild corn poppy, Papaver rhoeas, which is distinguished by its bright red color and orange tint. It eventually passed into English usage as the name of a color based upon that of the flower. The first recorded use of this usage was in the year 1795.

Claude Monet painted Les Coquelicots or Poppies Blooming in 1873.

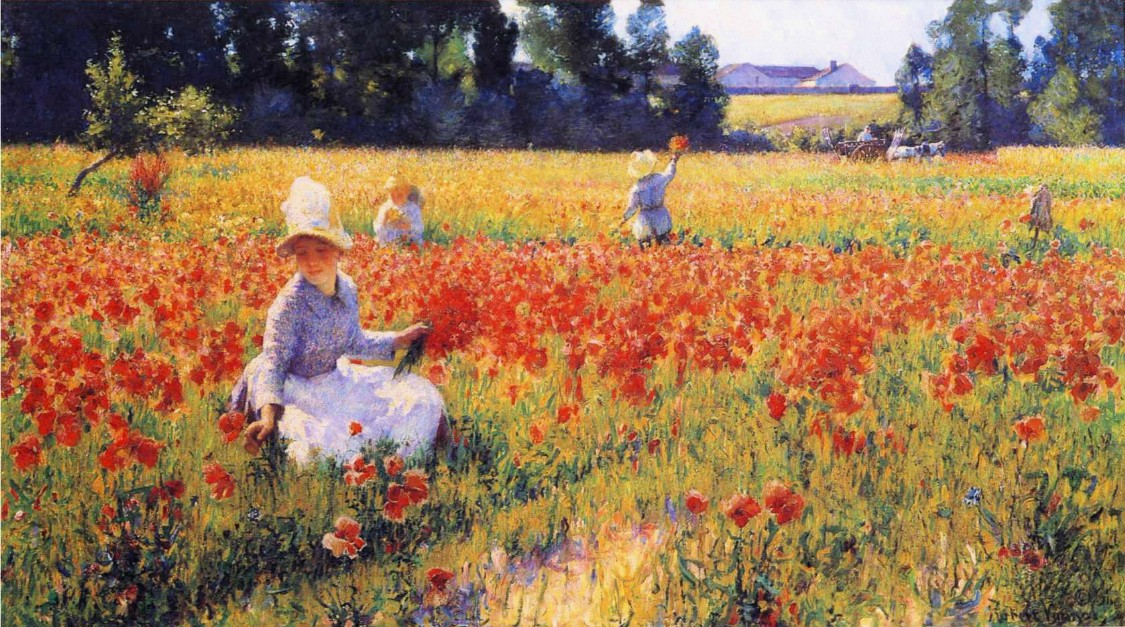
Coquelicots by Robert Vonnoh, 1890

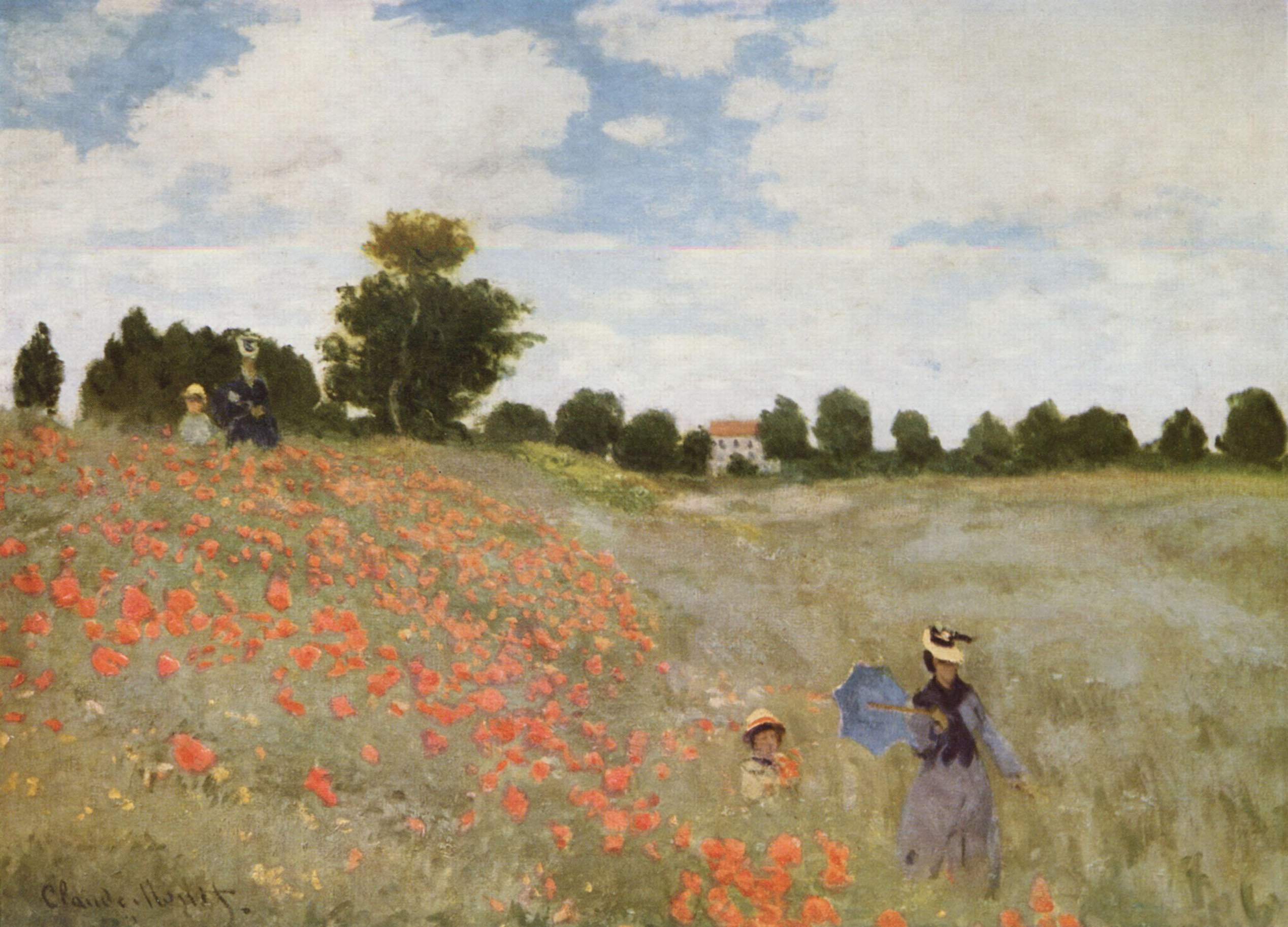
Les Coquelicots by Claude Monet, 1873.

== See also ==
- List of colors
