= Best of the Best: 20 Years of the Year's Best Science Fiction =

2005 anthology edited by Gardner Dozois

Best of the Best: 20 Years of The Year's Best Science Fiction
- Editor: Gardner Dozois
- Language: English
- Series: The Year's Best Science Fiction
- Genre: Science fiction
- Publisher: St. Martin's Griffin
- Publication date: 2005
- Publication place: United States
- Media type: Print (Hardcover and Paperback)
- Pages: 655 pp
- ISBN: 978-0-312-33656-1 (hardcover); ISBN 978-0-312-33655-4 (paperback)
- OCLC: 56753613
- Dewey Decimal: 813/.0876608 22
- LC Class: PS648.S3 B499 2005
- Followed by: Best of the Best Volume 2: 20 Years of the Year's Best Short Science Fiction Novels

Best of the Best: 20 Years of the Year's Best Science Fiction (ISBN 978-0-312-33656-1) is a science fiction anthology edited by Gardner Dozois that was published in 2005. It is a special edition in The Year's Best Science Fiction series.

== Contents ==
The book includes a 5-page foreword by Robert Silverberg, a 3-page preface by Dozois, and 36 stories selected by Dozois from among prior annual editions of The Year's Best Science Fiction. Although it is billed as "20 years" of the year's best science fiction, it was actually edited after the 21st edition of the series, and the editor selected from among all 21 editions.

- Greg Bear: "Blood Music" (Page 1)
- Gene Wolfe: "A Cabin on the Coast" (Page 19)
- Lucius Shepard: "Salvador" (Page 28)
- Nancy Kress: "Trinity" (Page 42)
- Howard Waldrop: "Flying Saucer Rock and Roll" (Page 78)
- Bruce Sterling: "Dinner in Audoghast" (Page 93)
- Pat Cadigan: "Roadside Rescue" (Page 103)
- John Crowley: "Snow" (Page 109)
- William Gibson: "The Winter Market" (Page 121)
- John Kessel: "The Pure Product" (Page 137)
- Eileen Gunn: "Stable Strategies for Middle Management" (Page 152)
- Mike Resnick: "Kirinyaga" (Page 162)
- Robert Silverberg: "Tales from the Venia Woods" (Page 177)
- Terry Bisson: "Bears Discover Fire" (Page 191)
- Connie Willis: "Even the Queen" (Page 199)
- Robert Reed: "Guest of Honor" (Page 213)
- Joe Haldeman: "None So Blind" (Page 238)
- Brian Stableford: "Mortimer Gray's History of Death" (Page 246)
- Maureen F. McHugh: "The Lincoln Train" (Page 293)
- Greg Egan: "Wang's Carpets" (Page 303)
- Ursula K. Le Guin: "Coming of Age in Karhide" (Page 328)
- Michael Swanwick: "The Dead" (Page 342)
- Ian McDonald: "Recording Angel" (Page 352)
- Tony Daniel: "A Dry, Quiet War" (Page 363)
- William Sanders: "The Undiscovered" (Page 380)
- Paul J. McAuley: "Second Skin" (Page 400)
- Ted Chiang: "Story of Your Life" (Page 418)
- Stephen Baxter: "People Came From Earth" (Page 454)
- David Marusek: "The Wedding Album" (Page 464)
- James Patrick Kelly: "10^{16} To 1" (Page 502)
- Walter Jon Williams: "Daddy's World" (Page 520)
- Steven Utley: "The Real World" (Page 541)
- Geoff Ryman: "Have Not Have" (Page 561)
- Charles Stross: "Lobsters" (Page 577)
- Ian R. MacLeod: "Breathmoss" (Page 597)
- Molly Gloss: "Lambing Season" (Page 647)

The UK edition, titled The Mammoth Book of The Best of The Best New SF included three additional stories at the end of the book:

- Paolo Bacigalupi: "The Fluted Girl"
- Peter F. Hamilton: "Footvote"
- Alastair Reynolds: "Zima Blue"
