= Locus Award for Best Anthology =

The Locus Award for Best Anthology is one of the annual Locus Awards presented by the science fiction and fantasy magazine Locus. Awards presented in a given year are for works published in the previous calendar year. The award for Best Anthology was originally presented as Best Original Anthology between 1972 and 1975, in conjunction with a Best Reprint Anthology/Collection award which evolved into the modern Best Collection award.

== Winners ==
=== Best Original Anthology ===
Award winners
Year	Nominated work	Author	Ref.
1972	Universe 1	Terry Carr	
1973	Again, Dangerous Visions	Harlan Ellison	
1974	Astounding: John W. Campbell Memorial Anthology	Harlan Ellison	
1975	Universe 4	Terry Carr	

=== Best Anthology ===
With the 1976 awards, the category was renamed Best Anthology.

Award winners
Year	Nominated work	Author	Ref.
1976	Epoch	Roger Elwood and Robert Silverberg	
1977	The Best Science Fiction of the Year 5	Terry Carr	
1978	Category not awarded	Roger Elwood	
1979	The Best Science Fiction of the Year 7	Terry Carr	
1980	Universe 9	Terry Carr	
1981	The Magazine of Fantasy & Science Fiction: A 30 Year Retrospective	Edward L. Ferman	
1982	Shadows of Sanctuary	Robert Lynn Asprin	
1983	The Best Science Fiction of the Year 11	Terry Carr	
1984	The Best Science Fiction of the Year 12	Terry Carr	
1985	Light Years and Dark	Michael Bishop	
1986	Medea: Harlan's World	Harlan Ellison	
1987	The Year's Best Science Fiction: Third Annual Collection	Gardner Dozois	
1988	The Year's Best Science Fiction: Fourth Annual Collection	Gardner Dozois	
1989	Full Spectrum	Lou Aronica and Shawna McCarthy	
1990	The Year's Best Science Fiction: Sixth Annual Collection	Gardner Dozois	
1991	The Year's Best Science Fiction: Seventh Annual Collection	Gardner Dozois	
1992	Full Spectrum 3	Lou Aronica, Amy Stout, and Betsy Mitchell	
1993	The Year's Best Science Fiction: Ninth Annual Collection	Gardner Dozois	
1994	The Year's Best Science Fiction: Tenth Annual Collection	Gardner Dozois	
1995	The Year's Best Science Fiction: Eleventh Annual Collection	Gardner Dozois	
1996	The Year's Best Science Fiction: Twelfth Annual Collection	Gardner Dozois	
1997	The Year's Best Science Fiction: Thirteenth Annual Collection	Gardner Dozois	
1998	The Year's Best Science Fiction: Fourteenth Annual Collection	Gardner Dozois	
1999	Legends	Robert Silverberg	
2000	Far Horizons	Robert Silverberg	
2001	The Year's Best Science Fiction: Seventeenth Annual Collection	Gardner Dozois	
2002	The Year's Best Science Fiction: Eighteenth Annual Collection	Gardner Dozois	
2003	The Year's Best Science Fiction: Nineteenth Annual Collection	Gardner Dozois	
2004	The Year's Best Science Fiction: Twentieth Annual Collection	Gardner Dozois	
2005	The Year's Best Science Fiction: Twenty-First Annual Collection	Gardner Dozois	
2006	The Year's Best Fantasy and Horror: Eighteenth Annual Collection	Ellen Datlow, Kelly Link, and Gavin J. Grant	
2007	The Year's Best Science Fiction: Twenty-Third Annual Collection	Gardner Dozois	
2008	The New Space Opera	Gardner Dozois and Jonathan Strahan	
2009	The Year's Best Science Fiction: Twenty-Fifth Annual Collection	Gardner Dozois	
2010	The New Space Opera 2	Gardner Dozois and Jonathan Strahan	
2011	Warriors	George R.R. Martin and Gardner Dozois	
2012	The Year's Best Science Fiction: Twenty-Eighth Annual Collection	Gardner Dozois	
2013	Edge of Infinity	Jonathan Strahan	
2014	Old Mars	George R.R. Martin and Gardner Dozois	
2015	Rogues	George R.R. Martin and Gardner Dozois	
2016	Old Venus	George R.R. Martin and Gardner Dozois	
2017	The Big Book of Science Fiction	Ann VanderMeer and Jeff VanderMeer	
2018	The Book of Swords	Gardner Dozois	
2019	The Book of Magic	Gardner Dozois	
2020	New Suns: Original Speculative Fiction by People of Color	Nisi Shawl	
2021	The Book of Dragons	Jonathan Strahan	
2022	We're Here: The Best Queer Speculative Fiction 2020	C. L. Clark and Charles Payseur	
2023	Africa Risen: A New Era of Speculative Fiction	Sheree Renée Thomas, Oghenechovwe Donald Ekpeki, and Zelda Knight	
2024	Out There Screaming	Jordan Peele and John Joseph Adams	
2025	The Black Girl Survives in This One	Desiree S. Evans and Saraciea J. Fennell	
2026	We Will Rise Again	Karen Lord, Annalee Newitz, and Malka Older	
