= The Year's Best Science Fiction: Eighth Annual Collection =

1991 anthology edited by Gardner Dozois

- Editor: Gardner Dozois
- Cover artist: Michael Whelan
- Language: English
- Series: The Year's Best Science Fiction
- Genre: Science fiction
- Publisher: St. Martin's Press
- Publication date: 1991
- Publication place: United States
- Media type: Print (hardcover & trafe paperback)
- Pages: 624 pp
- ISBN: 9780312060084
- Preceded by: The Year's Best Science Fiction: Seventh Annual Collection
- Followed by: The Year's Best Science Fiction: Ninth Annual Collection

The Year's Best Science Fiction: Eighth Annual Collection is a science fiction anthology edited by Gardner Dozois that was published in 1991. It is the 8th in The Year's Best Science Fiction series.

== Contents ==
The book begins with a 22-page summation by Dozois describing important events in science fiction publishing during 1990. It includes 25 science fiction stories selected by Dozois that first appeared in 1990. The stories are as follows:

- James Patrick Kelly: "Mr. Boy"
- Ursula K. Le Guin: "The Shobies' Story"
- Greg Egan: "The Caress"
- Charles Sheffield: "A Braver Thing"
- Bruce Sterling: "We See Things Differently"
- Kate Wilhelm: "And the Angels Sing"
- Ian R. MacLeod: "Past Magic"
- Terry Bisson: "Bears Discover Fire"
- Lucius Shepard and Robert Frazier: "The All-Consuming"
- Molly Gloss: "Personal Silence"
- John Kessel: "Invaders"
- Michael Moorcock: "The Cairene Purse"
- Dafydd ab Hugh: "The Coon Rolled Down and Ruptured His Larinks, a Squeezed Novel by Mr. Skunk"
- Ted Chiang: "Tower of Babylon"
- Alexander Jablokov: "The Death Artist"
- John Brunner: "The First Since Ancient Persia"
- Nancy Kress: "Inertia"
- Greg Egan: "Learning to be Me"
- Connie Willis: "Cibola"
- Jonathan Lethem: "Walking the Moons"
- Ian McDonald: "Rainmaker Cometh"
- Robert Silverberg: "Hot Sky"
- Lewis Shiner: "White City"
- Pat Murphy: "Love and Sex Among the Invertebrates"
- Joe Haldeman: "The Hemingway Hoax"
