= The Year's Best Science Fiction: Fifteenth Annual Collection =

Book by Gardner Dozois

- Editor: Gardner Dozois
- Language: English
- Series: The Year's Best Science Fiction
- Genre: Science fiction
- Publisher: St. Martin's Griffin
- Publication date: 1998
- Publication place: United States
- Media type: Print (hardcover & trade paperback)
- Pages: 623 pp
- ISBN: 9780312187798 (hardcover) ISBN 9780312190330 (trade paperback)
- OCLC: 39397318
- Preceded by: The Year's Best Science Fiction: Fourteenth Annual Collection
- Followed by: The Year's Best Science Fiction: Sixteenth Annual Collection

The Year's Best Science Fiction: Fifteenth Annual Collection is a science fiction anthology edited by Gardner Dozois that was published in 1998. It is the 15th in The Year's Best Science Fiction series.

== Contents ==
The book includes a 49-page summation by Dozois; 28 stories, all that first appeared in 1997, and each with a two-paragraph introduction by Dozois; and a seven-page referenced list of honorable mentions for the year. The stories are as follows.

- Robert Silverberg: "Beauty in the Night"
- Paul J. McAuley: "Second Skin"
- Nancy Kress: "Steamship Soldier on the Information Front"
- Greg Egan: "Reasons to Be Cheerful"
- Stephen Baxter: "Moon Six"
- Bill Johnson: "We Will Drink a Fish Together..."
- Peter F. Hamilton: "Escape Route"
- James Patrick Kelly: "Itsy Bitsy Spider"
- Alastair Reynolds: "A Spy in Europa"
- William Sanders: "The Undiscovered"
- Alan Brennert: "Echoes"
- David Marusek: "Getting to Know You"
- Gwyneth Jones: "Balinese Dancer"
- Robert Reed: "Marrow"
- Howard Waldrop: "Heart of Whitenesse"
- Michael Swanwick: "The Wisdom of Old Earth"
- Brian Stableford: "The Pipes of Pan"
- G. David Nordley: "Crossing Chao Meng Fu"
- Greg Egan: "Yeyuka"
- Carolyn Ives Gilman: "Frost Painting"
- Walter Jon Williams: "Lethe"
- Geoffrey A. Landis: "Winter Fire"
- Ian R. MacLeod: "Nevermore"
- Simon Ings: "Open Veins"
- Ian McDonald: "After Kerry"
- Sean Williams and Simon Brown: "The Masque of Agamemnon"
- John Kessel: "Gulliver at Home"
- Gregory Benford and Elisabeth Malartre: "A Cold Dry Cradle"
