= The Year's Best Science Fiction: Second Annual Collection =

1985 science fiction anthology edited by Gardner Dozois

- Editor: Gardner Dozois
- Cover artist: Tom Kidd
- Language: English
- Series: The Year's Best Science Fiction
- Genre: Science fiction
- Publisher: St. Martin's Griffin (Bluejay Books)
- Publication date: 1985
- Publication place: United States
- Media type: Print (hardcover & trade paperback)
- Pages: 573 pp
- ISBN: 9780312944841
- OCLC: 12252028
- Preceded by: The Year's Best Science Fiction: First Annual Collection
- Followed by: The Year's Best Science Fiction: Third Annual Collection

The Year's Best Science Fiction: Second Annual Collection is a science fiction anthology edited by Gardner Dozois that was published in 1985. It is the 2nd in The Year's Best Science Fiction series.

== Contents ==
- "Salvador" by Lucius Shepard
- "Promises to Keep" by Jack McDevitt
- "Bloodchild" by Octavia E. Butler
- "Blued Moon" by Connie Willis
- "A Message to the King of Brobdingnag" by Richard Cowper
- "The Affair" by Robert Silverberg
- "PRESS ENTER []" by John Varley
- "New Rose Hotel" by William Gibson
- "The Map" by Gene Wolfe
- "Interlocking Pieces" by Molly Gloss
- "Trojan Horse" by Michael Swanwick
- "Bad Medicine" by Jack Dann
- "At the Embassy Club" by Elizabeth A. Lynn
- "Pursuit of Excellence" by Rena Yount
- "The Kindly Isle" by Frederik Pohl
- "Rock On" by Pat Cadigan
- "Sunken Gardens [Mechanist-Shapers]" by Bruce Sterling
- "Trinity" by Nancy Kress
- "The Trouble with the Cotton People" by Ursula K. Le Guin
- "Twilight Time" by Lewis Shiner
- "Black Coral" by Lucius Shepard
- "Friend" by James Patrick Kelly & John Kessel
- "Foreign Skins" by Tanith Lee
- "Company in the Wings" by R. A. Lafferty
- "A Cabin on the Coast" by Gene Wolfe
- "The Lucky Strike" by Kim Stanley Robinson
