= 56th World Science Fiction Convention =

56th Worldcon (1998)

BucConeer, the 56th World Science Fiction Convention
- Bucky, official convention mascot
- Genre: Science fiction
- Dates: 5–9 August 1998
- Venue: Baltimore Convention Center
- Location: Baltimore, Maryland
- Country: United States
- Filing status: 501(c)(3) non-profit
- Website: bucconeer.worldcon.org

The 56th World Science Fiction Convention (Worldcon), also known as BucConeer, was held on 5–9 August 1998 at the Baltimore Convention Center, the Baltimore Marriott Inner Harbor, the Holiday Inn Inner Harbor, the Omni Inner Harbor Baltimore (now the Wyndham), and the Baltimore Hilton and Towers in Baltimore, Maryland, United States.

The convention was chaired by Peggy Rae Pavlat.

== Participants ==
=== Guests of honor ===
- C. J. Cherryh, author
- Milt Rothman, fan
- Stanley Schmidt, editor
- Michael Whelan, artist
- Charles Sheffield, toastmaster

=== Special Guest ===
- J. Michael Straczynski

=== Program participants ===
Forrest J. Ackerman
Roger MacBride Allen
Kevin J. Anderson
Rebecca Moesta Anderson
Catherine Asaro
Pierce Askegren
Wayne Barlowe
William Barton
Stephen Baxter
Greg Bear
Stephanie Bedwell-Grime
eluki bes shahar
Kent Brewster
David Brin
Charles N. Brown
Edward Bryant
Jim Burns
Pat Cadigan
Jack L. Chalker
David Cherry
Richard Chwedyk
Hal Clement
Brenda Clough
John Clute
Glen Cook
John G. Cramer
Julie E. Czerneda
Jack Dann
Ellen Datlow
Colleen Doran
Gardner Dozois
Andy Duncan
Julia Ecklar
Scott Edelman
Laurie Toby Edison

George Alec Effinger
Bob Eggleton
Jane Fancher
David Feintuch
Leslie Fish
Michael Flynn
Frank Kelly Freas
Esther Friesner
Craig Shaw Gardner
James Alan Gardner
Richard Garfinkle
Mike Glyer
Alexis Gilliland
Lee Gold
Kathleen Ann Goonan
Joe Haldeman
Elizabeth Hand
David G. Hartwell
Teddy Harvia (David Thayer)
Peter Heck
Howard V. Hendrix
P. C. Hodgell
Peter Jackson
Steve Jackson
Kij Johnson
Robert Jordan
James Patrick Kelly
John Kessel
Thomas Kidd
Lee Killough
Edward Kramer
Nancy Kress
David Kyle
Geoffrey A. Landis
Paul Levinson
Shariann Lewitt

Jacqueline Lichtenberg
Barry B. Longyear
Don Maitz
Barry N. Malzberg
George R. R. Martin
Shawna McCarthy
Wil McCarthy
Maureen F. McHugh
Ron Miller
Steve Miller
Mary Anne Mohanraj
Elizabeth Moon
Chris Moore
James Morrow
Patrick Nielsen Hayden
Teresa Nielsen Hayden
Larry Niven
Jody Lynn Nye
Kevin O'Donnell
Jerry Oltion
Fred Patten
Frederik Pohl
Andrew I. Porter
Jerry Pournelle
Melanie Rawn
Robert Reed
Laura Resnick
Mike Resnick
Jennifer Roberson
John Maddox Roberts
Kim Stanley Robinson
Kristine Kathryn Rusch
Robert J. Sawyer
Darrell Schweitzer
Melissa Scott
Mark Shepherd

Josepha Sherman
Sharon Shinn
Susan Shwartz
Steven H Silver
Robert Silverberg
Joan Slonczewski
Dean Wesley Smith
Kristine Smith
Henry Spencer
Mary Stanton
Allen Steele
Sean Stewart
S. M. Stirling
Michael Swanwick
Cecilia Tan
Karen E. Taylor
Bjo Trimble
Harry Turtledove
Mary A. Turzillo
Gordon Van Gelder
James Van Pelt
Vernor Vinge
Lawrence Watt-Evans
Len Wein
Toni Weisskopf
Peter Weston
Ted White (author)
Sheila Williams
Walter Jon Williams
Jack Williamson
Connie Willis
John C. Wright
Janny Wurts
J. Steven York
Sarah Zettel

== Site selection ==
Philadelphia, Pennsylvania won the vote for the 59th World Science Fiction Convention, to be held in 2001.

== Awards ==
The World Science Fiction Society administers and presents the Hugo Awards, the oldest and most noteworthy award for science fiction. Selection of the recipients is by vote of the Worldcon members. Categories include novels and short fiction, artwork, dramatic presentations, and various professional and fandom activities.

Other awards may be presented at Worldcon at the discretion of the individual convention committee. This has often included the national SF awards of the host country, such as the Japanese Seiun Awards as part of Nippon 2007, and the Prix Aurora Awards as part of Anticipation in 2009. The Astounding Award for Best New Writer and the Sidewise Award, though not sponsored by the Worldcon, are usually presented, as well as the Chesley Awards, the Prometheus Award, and others. In 2021, the Nommo Awards began presenting at Worldcon.

=== 1998 Hugo Awards ===
The winners were:

- Best Novel: Forever Peace, by Joe Haldeman
- Best Novella: "...Where Angels Fear to Tread", by Allen Steele (Asimov's, October/November 1997)
- Best Novelette: "We Will Drink a Fish Together...", by Bill Johnson (Asimov's, May 1997)
- Best Short Story: "The 43 Antarean Dynasties", by Mike Resnick (Asimov's, December 1997)
- Best Related Book: The Encyclopedia of Fantasy, by John Clute and John Grant
- Best Dramatic Presentation: Contact
- Best Professional Editor: Gardner Dozois
- Best Professional Artist: Bob Eggleton
- Best Semiprozine: Locus, edited by Charles N. Brown
- Best Fanzine: Mimosa, edited by Nicki Lynch and Richard Lynch
- Best Fan Writer: Dave Langford
- Best Fan Artist: Joe Mayhew

=== Other awards ===
- John W. Campbell Award for Best New Writer: Mary Doria Russell

== Committee ==
- Convention Chair: Peggy Rae Pavlat

=== Division heads ===
- Member Services: Michelle Smith-Moore
- Facilities: Marty Gear
- Programming: John Pomeranz
- Events: Kent Bloom
- Operations: Tom Veal
- "Contents of Tables": Kathryn Daugherty
- Exhibits: Barbara Lynn Higgins
- Public Relations: Sam Lubell
- "Strange Fannish Stuff": Marc Gordon

=== Bid ===
- Chair: Hal Haag (1990–1991), Lance Oszko (1991–1993), Covert Beach (1993–1995)

=== Corporation ===
- President: Covert Beach
- Vice-presidents: Lance Oszko, Marty Gear
- Comptroller: Bob Macintosh
- Treasurer: Thomas Horman
- Recording Secretary: Thomas McMullan
- Corresponding Secretary: Jul Owings

== See also ==
- Hugo Award
- Science fiction
- Speculative fiction
- World Science Fiction Society
- Worldcon

Preceded by 55th World Science Fiction Convention; LoneStarCon 2 in San Antonio, Texas, United States (1997)	List of Worldcons; 56th World Science Fiction Convention; Bucconeer in Baltimore, Maryland, United States (1998)	Succeeded by 57th World Science Fiction Convention; Aussiecon Three in Melbourne, Australia (1999)
