= 1998 in science fiction =

The year 1998 was marked, in science fiction, by the following:

== Events ==
- The 56th annual Worldcon, BucConeer, was held in Baltimore, USA

== Births and deaths ==
=== Deaths ===
- Jo Clayton
- Alain Dorémieux
- Ernst Jünger

== Literary releases ==
=== Novels ===
- Brown Girl in the Ring, by Nalo Hopkinson
- Children of God, by Mary Doria Russell
- Parable of the Talents, by Octavia E. Butler

=== Short stories ===
- Story of Your Life, by Ted Chiang

== Movies ==
- Armageddon, dir. by Michael Bay
- Dark City, dir. by Alex Proyas
- Lost in Space, dir. by Stephen Hopkins
- Six-String Samurai, dir. by Lance Mungia
- The Truman Show, dir. by Peter Weir

== Television ==
- Cowboy Bebop
- First Wave
- Serial Experiments Lain

== Video games ==
- Half-Life
- Metal Gear Solid
- StarCraft

== Awards ==
=== Hugos ===
- Best novel: Forever Peace, by Joe Haldeman
- Best novella: ...Where angels fear to Tread, by Allen Steele
- Best novelette: "We Will Drink a Fish Together", by Bill Johnson
- Best short story: "The 43 Antarean Dynasties", by Mike Resnick
- Best related work: The Encyclopedia of Fantasy, ed. by John Clute and John Grant
- Best dramatic presentation: Contact, dir. by Robert Zemeckis; Screenplay by James V. Hart and Michael Goldenberg; based on the story by Carl Sagan and Ann Druyan; based on the novel by Carl Sagan
- Best professional editor: Gardner Dozois
- Best professional artist: Bob Eggleton
- Best Semiprozine: Locus, ed. by Charles N. Brown
- Best fanzine: Mimosa, ed. by Dick Lynch and Nicki Lynch
- Best fan writer: Dave Langford
- Best fan artist: Joe Mayhew

=== Nebulas ===
- Best novel: Forever Peace, by Joe Haldeman
- Best novella: Reading the Bones, by Sheila Finch
- Best novelette: "Lost Girls", by Jane Yolen
- Best short story: "Thirteen Ways to Water", by Bruce Holland Rogers

=== Other awards ===
- BSFA Award for Best Novel: The Sky Road, by Ken MacLeod
- Locus Award for Best Science Fiction Novel: The Rise of Endymion, by Dan Simmons
- Saturn Award for Best Science Fiction Film: Armageddon and Dark City (tie)
