= The Year's Best Science Fiction: Thirty-Fourth Annual Collection =

2017 anthology edited by Gardner Dozois

- Dust jacket of 1st edition
- Editor: Gardner Dozois
- Cover artist: Jim Burns
- Language: English
- Series: The Year's Best Science Fiction
- Genre: Science fiction
- Publisher: St. Martin's Press
- Publication date: 2017
- Publication place: United States
- Media type: Print (hardcover & trade paperback)
- Pages: xxxix & 660 pp.
- ISBN: 9781250119230
- Preceded by: The Year's Best Science Fiction: Thirty-Third Annual Collection
- Followed by: The Year's Best Science Fiction: Thirty-Fifth Annual Collection

The Year's Best Science Fiction: Thirty-Fourth Annual Collection is an anthology of science fiction short stories edited by Gardner Dozois, the thirty-fourth volume in an ongoing series. It was first published in hardcover, trade paperback and ebook by St. Martin's Griffin in July 2017.

== Summary ==
The book collects 39 novellas, novelettes and short stories by various science fiction authors, with an introductory summation of the year, notes and concluding bibliography by the editor. The stories were previously published in 2016 in various science fiction and other magazines.

== Contents ==
Summation: 2016 (Gardner Dozois)

1. "Terminal" (Lavie Tidhar)
2. "Touring with the Alien" (Carolyn Ives Gilman)
3. "Patience Lake" (Matthew Claxton)
4. "Jonas and the Fox" (Rich Larson)
5. "Prodigal" (Gord Sellar)
6. "KIT: Some Assembly Required" (Kathe Koja and Carter Scholz)
7. "Vortex" (Gregory Benford)
8. "Elves of Antarctica" (Paul J. McAuley)
9. "The Baby Eaters" (Ian McHugh)
10. "A Salvaging of Ghosts" (Aliette de Bodard)
11. "Those Shadows Laugh" (Geoff Ryman)
12. "Redking" (Craig DeLancey)
13. "Things with Beards" (Sam J. Miller)
14. "Fieldwork" (Shariann Lewitt)
15. "The Further Adventures of Mr. Costello" (David Gerrold)
16. "Innumerable Glimmering Lights" (Rich Larson)
17. "Fifty Shades of Grays" (Steven Barnes)
18. "Sixteen Questions for Kamala Chatterjee" (Alastair Reynolds)
19. "Cold Comfort" (Pat Murphy and Paul Doherty)
20. "The Art of Space Travel" (Nina Allan)
21. "Flight from the Ages" (Derek Künsken)
22. "My Generations Shall Praise" (Samantha Henderson)
23. "Mars Abides" (Stephen Baxter)
24. "The Visitor from Taured" (Ian R. MacLeod)
25. "When the Stone Eagle Flies" (Bill Johnson)
26. "The Vanishing Kind" (Lavie Tidhar)
27. "One Sister, Two Sisters, Three" (James Patrick Kelly)
28. "Dispatches from the Cradle: The Hermit - Forty-Eight Hours in the Sea of Massachusetts" (Ken Liu)
29. "Checkerboard Planet" (Eleanor Arnason)
30. "They Have All One Breath" (Karl Bunker)
31. "Mika Model" (Paolo Bacigalupi)
32. "That Game We Played During the War" (Carrie Vaughn)
33. "Because Change Was the Ocean and We Lived by Her Mercy" (Charlie Jane Anders)
34. "The One Who Isn't" (Ted Kosmatka)
35. "Those Brighter Stars" (Mercurio D. Rivera)
36. "A Tower for the Coming World" (Maggie Clark)
37. "Firstborn, Lastborn" (Melissa Scott)
38. "Women's Christmas" (Ian McDonald)
39. "The Iron Tactician" (Alastair Reynolds)

Honorable Mentions: 2016 (Gardner Dozois)
