= The Year's Best Science Fiction: Fifth Annual Collection =

1988 anthology of science fiction short stories edited by Gardner Dozois

- Dust jacket of 1st edition
- Editor: Gardner Dozois
- Cover artist: Alan Gutierrez
- Language: English
- Series: The Year's Best Science Fiction
- Genre: Science fiction
- Publisher: St. Martin's Press
- Publication date: 1988
- Publication place: United States
- Media type: Print (hardcover & trade paperback)
- Pages: xxv & 678 pp
- ISBN: 9780312018535
- OCLC: 18121368
- Dewey Decimal: 813.0876
- LC Class: PN6071.S33 Y432 1988
- Preceded by: The Year's Best Science Fiction: Fourth Annual Collection
- Followed by: The Year's Best Science Fiction: Sixth Annual Collection

The Year's Best Science Fiction: Fifth Annual Collection is an anthology of science fiction short stories edited by Gardner Dozois, the fifth volume in an ongoing series. It was first published in hardcover and trade paperback by St. Martin's Press in May 1988, with the latter reprinted in June 1994. The first British edition was published in hardcover and trade paperback by Robinson in September 1988, under the alternate title Best New SF 2.

== Summary ==
The book collects twenty-eight novellas, novelettes and short stories by various science fiction authors, with an introductory summation of the year, notes and concluding bibliography by the editor. The stories were previously published in 1987 in various science fiction and other magazines.

== Contents ==
- "Summation: 1987" (Gardner Dozois)
- "Rachel in Love" (Pat Murphy)
- "Dream Baby" (Bruce McAllister)
- "Flowers of Edo" (Bruce Sterling)
- "Forever Yours, Anna" (Kate Wilhelm)
- "At the Cross-Time Jaunter's Ball" (Alexander Jablokov)
- "Dinosaurs" (Walter Jon Williams)
- "Perpetuity Blues" (Neal Barrett, Jr.)
- "The Temporary King" (Paul J. McAuley)
- "Buffalo Gals, Won't You Come Out Tonight" (Ursula K. Le Guin)
- "The Pardoner's Tale" (Robert Silverberg)
- "Glass Cloud" (James Patrick Kelly)
- "The Evening and the Morning and the Night" (Octavia E. Butler)
- "Night of the Cooters" (Howard Waldrop)
- "Angel" (Pat Cadigan)
- "Shades" (Lucius Shepard)
- "The Faithful Companion at Forty" (Karen Joy Fowler)
- "Candle in a Cosmic Wind" (Joseph Manzione)
- "The Emir's Clock" (Ian Watson)
- "Ever After" (Susan Palwick)
- "The Forest of Time" (Michael Flynn)
- "The Million-Dollar Wound" (Dean Whitlock)
- "The Moon of Popping Trees" (R. Garcia y Robertson)
- "Diner" (Neal Barrett, Jr.)
- "All the Hues of Hell" (Gene Wolfe)
- "Halley's Passing" (Michael McDowell)
- "America" (Orson Scott Card)
- "For Thus Do I Remember Carthage" (Michael Bishop)
- "Mother Goddess of the World" (Kim Stanley Robinson)
- "Honorable Mentions: 1987" (Gardner Dozois)

== Awards ==
The anthology placed second in the 1989 Locus Poll Award for Best Anthology.
