= Best of the Best Volume 2: 20 Years of the Year's Best Short Science Fiction Novels =

2007 anthology edited by Gardner Dozois

- First edition
- Editor: Gardner Dozois
- Language: English
- Series: The Year's Best Science Fiction
- Genre: Science fiction
- Publisher: St. Martin's Griffin
- Publication date: 2007
- Publication place: United States
- Media type: Print (Hardcover and Paperback)
- Pages: 642
- ISBN: 978-0-312-36341-3
- OCLC: 71173902
- Dewey Decimal: 813/.0876608 22
- LC Class: PS648.S3 B499 2007
- Preceded by: Best of the Best: 20 Years of the Year's Best Science Fiction

Best of the Best Volume 2: 20 Years of the Year's Best Short Science Fiction Novels (ISBN 978-0312363413) is a science fiction anthology edited by Gardner Dozois that was published in 2007. It is a special edition in The Year's Best Science Fiction series.

== Contents ==
The book includes 13 novellas selected by Dozois from among prior annual editions of The Year's Best Science Fiction. Although it is billed as "20 years" of the year's best science fiction, it was actually edited after the 22nd edition of the series. It also includes a three-page preface by Dozois explaining that he set out to edit just one "Best of the Best" volume but found it impossible to do justice to such a task without adding a second volume, to focus on longer works that would have taken too much space away from the first "Best of the Best" installment. Out of 13 authors in the second volume, all but two (Pohl and Reynolds) were also included in the first volume. The stories are as follows.

- Robert Silverberg: "Sailing to Byzantium"
- Walter Jon Williams: "Surfacing"
- Joe Haldeman: "The Hemingway Hoax"
- James Patrick Kelly: "Mr. Boy"
- Nancy Kress: "Beggars In Spain"
- Michael Swanwick: "Griffin's Egg"
- Frederik Pohl: "Outnumbering The Dead"
- Ursula K. Le Guin: "Forgiveness Day"
- Maureen F. McHugh: "The Cost To Be Wise"
- Greg Egan: "Oceanic"
- Ian McDonald: "Tendeléo's Story"
- Ian R. MacLeod: "New Light On The Drake Equation"
- Alastair Reynolds: "Turquoise Days"

== Development history ==
=== Publication history ===
The book was published by St. Martin's Press on February 8, 2007.

== Reception ==
Kirkus Reviews published a positive review that described the stories as being high-quality.
