= The Year's Best Science Fiction: Ninth Annual Collection =

1992 anthology edited by Gardner Dozois

- Editor: Gardner Dozois
- Cover artist: Bob Eggleton
- Language: English
- Series: The Year's Best Science Fiction
- Genre: Science fiction
- Publisher: St. Martin's Press
- Publication date: 1992
- Publication place: United States
- Media type: Print (hardcover & trade paperback)
- Pages: 575 pp
- ISBN: 9780312078904
- Preceded by: The Year's Best Science Fiction: Eighth Annual Collection
- Followed by: The Year's Best Science Fiction: Tenth Annual Collection

The Year's Best Science Fiction: Ninth Annual Collection is a science fiction anthology edited by Gardner Dozois that was published in 1992. It is the 9th in The Year's Best Science Fiction series and won the Locus Award for best anthology.

== Contents ==
The book includes a 50-page summation by Dozois; 28 stories, all that first appeared in 1991, and each with a two-paragraph introduction by Dozois; and a referenced list of honorable mentions for the year. The stories are as follows.

- Nancy Kress: "Beggars in Spain", which went on to win the 1992 Hugo Award for Best Novella
- Alexander Jablokov: "Living Will"
- Lois Tilton: "A Just and Lasting Peace"
- William Gibson: "Skinner's Room"
- Walter Jon Williams: "Prayers on the Wind"
- Greg Egan: "Blood Sisters"
- Karen Joy Fowler: "The Dark"
- Ian R. MacLeod: "Marnie"
- Robert Silverberg: "A Tip on a Turtle"
- Kim Newman: "Ubermensch!"
- Pat Cadigan: "Dispatches from the Revolution"
- Robert Reed: "Pipes"
- Gregory Benford: "Matter's End"
- Kim Stanley Robinson: "A History of the Twentieth Century, with Illustrations"
- Paul J. McAuley: "Gene Wars"
- Kristine Kathryn Rusch: "The Gallery of His Dreams"
- Geoffrey A. Landis: "A Walk in the Sun", which went on to win the 1992 Hugo Award for Best Short Story
- Ian McDonald: "Fragments of an Analysis of a Case of Hysteria"
- Kathe Koja: "Angels in Love"
- Rick Shelley: "Eyewall"
- James Patrick Kelly: "Pogrom"
- Greg Egan: "The Moat"
- Jack Dann: "Voices"
- Brian W. Aldiss: "FOAM"
- Connie Willis: "Jack"
- Chris Beckett: "La Macchina"
- Mike Resnick: "One Perfect Morning, with Jackals"
- Mark L. Van Name and Pat Murphy: "Desert Rain"
