= The Year's Best Science Fiction: Sixth Annual Collection =

1989 science fiction anthology edited by Gardner Dozois

- Editor: Gardner Dozois
- Language: English
- Series: The Year's Best Science Fiction
- Genre: Science fiction
- Publisher: St. Martin's Press
- Publication date: 1989
- Publication place: United States
- Media type: Print (hardcover & trade paperback)
- Pages: xxxiv & 612 pp
- ISBN: 9780312030094
- Preceded by: The Year's Best Science Fiction: Fifth Annual Collection
- Followed by: The Year's Best Science Fiction: Seventh Annual Collection

The Year's Best Science Fiction: Sixth Annual Collection is a science fiction anthology edited by Gardner Dozois that was published in 1989. It is the 6th in The Year's Best Science Fiction series and winner of the Locus Award for best anthology.

== Contents ==
The book includes a 17-page summation by Dozois; 28 stories, all that first appeared in 1988, and each with a two-paragraph introduction by Dozois; and a referenced list of honorable mentions for the year. The stories are as follows.

- Walter Jon Williams: "Surfacing"
- James Patrick Kelly: "Home Front"
- Brian Stableford: "The Man Who Loved the Vampire Lady"
- Steven Gould: "Peaches for Mad Molly"
- Harry Turtledove: "The Last Article"
- Eileen Gunn: "Stable Strategies for Middle Management"
- Nancy Kress: "In Memoriam"
- Mike Resnick: "Kirinyaga," which went on to win a 1989 Hugo Award for Best Short Story
- Bruce McAllister: "The Girl Who Loved Animals"
- Connie Willis: "The Last of the Winnebagoes," which went on to win a 1989 Hugo Award for Best Novella
- Lewis Shiner: "Love In Vain"
- Judith Moffett: "The Hob"
- Bruce Sterling: "Our Neural Chernobyl"
- Robert Silverberg: "House of Bones"
- George Alec Effinger: "Schrödinger's Kitten", which went on to win a 1989 Hugo Award for Best Novelette
- Howard Waldrop: "Do Ya, Do Ya, Wanna Dance?"
- Brian Stableford: "The Growth of the House of Usher"
- Kim Stanley Robinson: "Glacier"
- James Lawson: "Sanctuary"
- Michael Swanwick: "The Dragon Line"
- John Kessel: "Mrs. Shummel Exits a Winner"
- Stephen Kraus: "Emissary"
- Pat Cadigan: "It Was the Heat"
- Kristine Kathryn Rusch: "Skin Deep"
- D. Alexander Smith: "Dying in Hull"
- Kathe Koja: "Distances"
- Kim Newman: "Famous Monsters"
- Lucius Shepard: "The Scalehunter's Beautiful Daughter"
