= The Year's Best Science Fiction: Thirty-Second Annual Collection =

2015 anthology edited by Gardner Dozois

- Editor: Gardner Dozois
- Language: English
- Series: The Year's Best Science Fiction
- Genre: Science fiction
- Publisher: St. Martin's Press
- Publication date: July 7, 2015
- Publication place: United States
- Media type: Print (hardcover & trade paperback)
- Pages: 704 pp
- ISBN: 9781466870482
- Preceded by: The Year's Best Science Fiction: Thirty-First Annual Collection
- Followed by: The Year's Best Science Fiction: Thirty-Third Annual Collection

The Year's Best Science Fiction: Thirty-Second Annual Collection is a science fiction anthology edited by Gardner Dozois that was published on July 7, 2015. It is the 32nd in The Year's Best Science Fiction series.

== Contents ==
The book includes 36 stories, all first published in 2014. The book also includes a summation by Dozois, a brief introduction by Dozois to each story, and a referenced list of honorable mentions for the year. The stories are as follows:

- "The Fifth Dragon" by Ian McDonald (from Reach for Infinity)
- "The Rider" by Jérôme Cigut (from The Magazine of Fantasy & Science Fiction)
- "The Days of the War, as Red as Blood, as Dark as Bile" by Aliette de Bodard (from Subterranean Online)
- "The Burial of Sir John Mawe at Cassini" by Chaz Brenchley (from Subterranean Online)
- "The Regular" by Ken Liu (from Upgraded)
- "The Woman from the Ocean" by Karl Bunker (from Isaac Asimov's Science Fiction Magazine)
- "Shooting the Apocalypse" by Paolo Bacigalupi (from The End Is Nigh)
- "Weather" by Susan Palwick (from Clarkesworld)
- "The Hand Is Quicker" by Elizabeth Bear (from The Book of Robert Silverberg)
- "The Man Who Sold the Moon" by Cory Doctorow (from Hieroglyph)
- "Vladimir Chong Chooses To Die" by Lavie Tidhar (from Analog Science Fiction and Fact)
- "Beside the Damned River" by D.J. Cockburn (from Interzone)
- "The Colonel" by Peter Watts (from Tor.com)
- "Entanglement" by Vandana Singh (from Hieroglyph)
- "White Curtain" by Pavel Amnuel (from The Magazine of Fantasy & Science Fiction)
- "Slipping" by Lauren Beukes (from Twelve Tomorrows)
- "Passage of Earth" by Michael Swanwick (from Clarkesworld)
- "Amicae Aeternum" by Ellen Klages (from Reach for Infinity)
- "In Babelsberg" by Alastair Reynolds (from Reach for Infinity)
- "Sadness" by Timons Esaias (from Analog)
- "West to East" by Jay Lake (from Subterranean Online)
- "Grand Jeté (The Great Leap)" by Rachel Swirsky (from Subterranean Online)
- "Covenent" by Elizabeth Bear (from Hieroglyph)
- "Jubilee" Karl Schroeder (from Tor.com)
- "Los Pirates del Mar de Plastico (Pirates of the Plastic Ocean)" by Paul Graham Raven (from Twelve Tomorrows)
- "Red Light, and Rain" Gareth L. Powell (from Solaris Rising 3)
- "Coma Kings" by Jessica Barber (from Lightspeed)
- "The Prodigal Son" by Allen M. Steele (from Isaac Asimov's Science Fiction Magazine)
- "God Decay" by Rich Larson (from Upgraded)
- "Blood Wedding" Robert Reed (from Isaac Asimov's Science Fiction Magazine)
- "The Long Haul From the ANNALS OF TRANSPORTATION, The Pacific Monthly, May 2009" by Ken Liu (from Clarkesworld)
- "Shadow Flock" by Greg Egan (from Coming Soon Enough)
- "Thing and Sick" by Adam Roberts (from Solaris Rising 3)
- "Communion" by Mary Anne Mohanraj (from Clarkesworld)
- "Someday" by James Patrick Kelly (from Isaac Asimov's Science Fiction Magazine)
- "Yesterday’s Kin" by Nancy Kress (from Tachyon)
