= The Year's Best Science Fiction: Tenth Annual Collection =

1993 anthology edited by Gardner Dozois

- dust cover of first edition
- Editor: Gardner Dozois
- Cover artist: Bob Eggleton
- Language: English
- Series: The Year's Best Science Fiction
- Genre: Science fiction
- Publisher: St. Martin's Press
- Publication date: 1993
- Publication place: United States
- Media type: Print (hardcover & trade paperback)
- Pages: xxxvi & 588 pp
- ISBN: 9780312094232
- Preceded by: The Year's Best Science Fiction: Ninth Annual Collection
- Followed by: The Year's Best Science Fiction: Eleventh Annual Collection

The Year's Best Science Fiction: Tenth Annual Collection is an anthology of science fiction short stories edited by Gardner Dozois, the tenth volume in an ongoing series. It was first published in hardcover by St. Martin's Press in June 1993, with a trade paperback edition following in July 1993 and a book club edition co-issued with the Science Fiction Book Club in September 1993. The first British edition were published in hardcover by Robinson in September of the same year, under the alternate title Best New SF 7.

== Summary ==
The book collects twenty-four novellas, novelettes and short stories by various science fiction authors, with an introductory summation of the year, notes and concluding bibliography by the editor. The stories were previously published in 1991 and 1992 in various science fiction and other magazines.

== Contents ==
- "Summation: 1992" (Gardner Dozois)
- "Griffin's Egg" (Michael Swanwick)
- "Even the Queen" (Connie Willis)
- "The Round-Eyed Barbarians" (L. Sprague de Camp)
- "Dust" (Greg Egan)
- "Two Guys from the Future" (Terry Bisson)
- "The Mountain to Mohammed" (Nancy Kress)
- "The Coming of Vertumnus" (Ian Watson)
- "A Long Night's Vigil at the Temple" (Robert Silverberg)
- "The Hammer of God" (Arthur C. Clarke)
- "Grownups" (Ian R. MacLeod)
- "Graves" (Joe Haldeman)
- "The Glowing Cloud" (Steven Utley)
- "Gravity's Angel" (Tom Maddox)
- "Protection" (Maureen F. McHugh)
- "The Last Cardinal Bird in Tennessee" (Neal Barrett, Jr.)
- "Birth Day" (Robert Reed)
- "Naming Names" (Pat Cadigan)
- "The Elvis National Theater of Okinawa" (Jonathan Lethem and Lukas Jaeger)
- "The Territory" (Bradley Denton)
- "The Best and the Rest of James Joyce" (Ian McDonald)
- "Naming the Flowers" (Kate Wilhelm)
- "Snodgrass" (Ian R. MacLeod)
- "By the Mirror of My Youth" (Kathe Koja)
- "Outnumbering the Dead" (Frederik Pohl)
- "Honorable Mentions: 1992" (Gardner Dozois)

== Awards ==
The anthology placed first in the 1994 Locus Poll Award for Best Anthology.
