= The Year's Best Science Fiction: Fourth Annual Collection =

1987 science fiction anthology edited by Gardner Dozois

- Author: Edited by Gardner Dozois
- Language: English
- Series: The Year's Best Science Fiction
- Genre: Science fiction
- Publisher: St. Martin's Press
- Publication date: 1987
- Publication place: United States
- Media type: Print (hardcover & trade paperback)
- Pages: xxi & 602 pp
- ISBN: 9780312944872
- Preceded by: The Year's Best Science Fiction: Third Annual Collection
- Followed by: The Year's Best Science Fiction: Fifth Annual Collection

The Year's Best Science Fiction: Fourth Annual Collection is a science fiction anthology edited by Gardner Dozois that was published in May 1987. It is the 4th in The Year's Best Science Fiction series. Cover art was by Alan Gutierrez. It won the Locus Award for best anthology. It was also published in the UK as The Mammoth Book of Best New Science Fiction, the first UK edition of the series.

== Contents ==
The book includes stories, all first published in 1986. The book also includes a summation by Dozois, a brief introduction to each story by Dozois and a referenced list of honorable mentions for the year. The stories are as follows:

- "R & R" (1986) by Lucius Shepard
- "Hatrack River [The Alvin Maker Saga]" (1986) by Orson Scott Card
- "Strangers on Paradise" (1986) by Damon Knight (variant of "Strangers in Paradise")
- "Pretty Boy Crossover" (1986) by Pat Cadigan
- "Against Babylon" (1986) by Robert Silverberg
- "Fiddling for Waterbuffaloes" (1986) by S. P. Somtow ([as by Somtow Sucharitkul9
- "Into Gold" (1986) by Tanith Lee
- "Sea Change" (1986) by Scott Baker
- "Covenant of Souls" (1986) by Michael Swanwick
- "The Pure Product" (1986) by John Kessel
- "Grave Angels" (1986) by Richard Kearns
- "Tangents" (1986) by Greg Bear
- "The Beautiful and the Sublime" (1986) by Bruce Sterling
- "Tattoos" (1986) by Jack Dann
- "Night Moves" (1986) by Tim Powers
- "The Prisoner of Chillon" (1986) by James Patrick Kelly
- "Chance" (1986) by Connie Willis
- "And so to Bed" (1986) by Harry Turtledove
- "Fair Game" (1986) by Howard Waldrop
- "Video Star" (1986) by Walter Jon Williams
- "Sallie C." (1986) by Neal Barrett, Jr.
- "Jeff Beck" (1986) by Lewis Shiner
- "Surviving" (1986) by Judith Moffett
- "Down and Out in the Year 2000" (1986) by Kim Stanley Robinson
- "Snake-Eyes" (1986) by Tom Maddox
- "The Gate of Ghosts" (1986) by Karen Joy Fowler
- "The Winter Market" (1985) by William Gibson
