= The Year's Best Science Fiction: Sixteenth Annual Collection =

1999 anthology edited by Gardner Dozois

- Editor: Gardner Dozois
- Language: English
- Series: The Year's Best Science Fiction
- Genre: Science fiction
- Publisher: St. Martin's Press
- Publication date: 1999
- Publication place: United States
- Media type: Print (hardcover & trade paperback)
- Pages: 609 pp
- ISBN: 9780312204457
- Preceded by: The Year's Best Science Fiction: Fifteenth Annual Collection
- Followed by: The Year's Best Science Fiction: Seventeenth Annual Collection

The Year's Best Science Fiction: Sixteenth Annual Collection is a science fiction anthology edited by Gardner Dozois that was published in 1999. It is the 16th in The Year's Best Science Fiction series.

It was described as "whopper of a book, containing over a quarter million words of fiction."

== Contents ==
The book includes a 49-page summation by Dozois; 25 stories, all that first appeared in 1998, and each with a two-paragraph introduction by Dozois; and a seven-page referenced list of honorable mentions for the year. Several of the stories have common themes: "Many of the stories in this collection deal with immortality ... [and] making first contact with an alien species."

The stories are as follows.

- Greg Egan: "Oceanic"
- Geoffrey A. Landis: "Approaching Perimelasma"
- Cory Doctorow: "Craphound"
- Tanith Lee: "Jedella Ghost"
- Bruce Sterling: "Taklamakan"
- Ursula K. Le Guin: "The Island Of the Immortals"
- Paul J. McAuley: "Sea Change, With Monsters"
- Robert Charles Wilson: "Divided By Infinity"
- Howard Waldrop: "US"
- Ian McDonald: "The Days Of Solomon Gursky"
- Robert Reed: "The Cuckoo's Boys"
- William Browning Spencer: "The Halfway House At the Heart Of Darkness"
- Michael Swanwick: "The Very Pulse of the Machine"
- Ted Chiang: "Story Of Your Life" - "the most famous story in this collection as it was turned into the movie Arrival in 2016."
- Liz Williams: "Voivodoi"
- Stephen Baxter: "Saddlepoint: Roughneck"
- Rob Chilson: "This Side Of Independence"
- Chris Lawson: "Unborn Again"
- Tony Daniel: "Grist"
- Gwyneth Jones: "La Cenerentola"
- William Barton: "Down In the Dark"
- Jim Grimsley: "Free In Asveroth"
- Cherry Wilder: "The Dancing Floor"
- Ian R. MacLeod: "The Summer Isles"
