= Mother of Eden =

2015 novel by Chris Beckett

- First edition (UK)
- Author: Chris Beckett
- Cover artist: Si Scott
- Language: English
- Genre: Social science fiction
- Publisher: Corvus (UK); Broadway Books (US)
- Publication date: 4 June 2015
- Publication place: United Kingdom
- Media type: Print (hardback & paperback)
- Pages: 400
- ISBN: 978-1782392354 (UK), ISBN 978-0804138703 (US)
- Preceded by: Dark Eden
- Followed by: Daughter of Eden

Mother of Eden is a social science fiction novel by British author Chris Beckett, published both in the United Kingdom and the United States in 2015. It is the sequel to the novel Dark Eden, and follows events of the first book several generations later.

== Plot summary ==
The novel follows an ambitious and restless Starlight Brooking multiple generations after John Redlantern's departure from Family. Eden's populace is divided into two factions, the innovative Johnfolk and the traditionalist Davidfolk. These two factions have entered an uneasy peace after years of conflict over the rightful ownership of Gela's ring, the ring lost by the original settler Gela. Starlight lives a reclusive life with her family on the remote island of Knee Tree Grounds, yearning for more than what her quiet life can provide. Starlight finds the opportunity she's been waiting for on a trip across the sea over to Veeklehouse where she meets the mysterious Greenstone Johnson. Greenstone informs her that the Johnfolk have built up a magnificent civilization named "New Earth" across the Worldpool and that he is next in line to be the Headman of New Earth. Greenstone, enamored by Starlight's beauty, asks Starlight to join him in New Earth as his housewoman and Starlight, seeing the situation as an opportunity to satisfy her curiosity and ambition, accepts.

New Earth has developed a class system consisting of "big people" who live in relative luxury in New Earth's capital of Edenheart supported by "small people" who work laborious jobs in order to support the innovations made by the Johnfolk and the lifestyle led by big people. New Earth operates under a theocracy with Gela being deified as the Mother of Eden and John portrayed as a messianic figure, their word and will decided upon by the teachers of New Earth and spread by a stand-in for Gela wearing Gela's ring. The ring-wearer is worshipped as the Mother of Eden by both big and small people, carrying out the word of Gela and caring for New Earth's people as a mother would care for her children.

The burden of ring-wearer falls upon Starlight as housewoman to the soon-to-be Headman and she becomes revered by her "children". As Starlight learns more and more about New Earth however, she begins to see the cruel mistreatment of small people as well as the ruthless political atmosphere perpetuated by the demands of big people. Starlight tries to change New Earth for the better but soon finds out that her role as Mother of Eden proves to be as constraining as it is powerful.

== Themes ==
A central theme the novel centers around is that of stories of the past and how they can be molded and shaped over time. This is especially shown through the apotheosis of what transpired in the first Eden novel, Beckett stating that these events begin "tipping over into becoming mythological." The transformation of stories in Eden into those of divine nature serves not just as a result of the passage of time, but as a tool used by those willing to exploit others in need of purpose and faith. "a religion is at the same time a source of comfort, an access point to truth, and a piece of political propaganda." Beckett states.

Beckett also delves into the role a mother plays people's lives and how this role manifests in a patriarchal society. He claims mothers hold immense power even in male-dominated spaces so much so it leads to the men of Eden to become afraid of her power and produce ways to contain and control it, Gela's ring for example. Starlight's bout as Mother of Eden showcased this power through the waves she made across New Earth and her ability to (or convince people she could) create miracles through her love.
