= Karen Taylor =

Karen Taylor may refer to:

- Karen Taylor (comedian) (born 1976), English comedian
- Karen Taylor (EastEnders), fictional character in the British soap opera EastEnders
- Karen Taylor (Hollyoaks), fictional character in the British soap opera Hollyoaks
- Karen Taylor (The Young and the Restless), fictional character in the American soap opera The Young and the Restless
- Karen E. Taylor, American horror and fantasy writer
- Karen T. Taylor (born 1952), American forensic artist
- Karen Taylor, basketball player and mother of basketball player Stanley Johnson
- Karrin Taylor Robson, Arizona politician
