= The Year's Best Science Fiction: Thirty-Fifth Annual Collection =

2018 anthology edited by Gardner Dozois

- Cover of paperback edition
- Editor: Gardner Dozois
- Cover artist: Jim Burns
- Language: English
- Series: The Year's Best Science Fiction
- Genre: Science fiction
- Publisher: St. Martin's Press
- Publication date: July 2018
- Publication place: United States
- Media type: Print (hardcover & trade paperback)
- Pages: xxxvi & 679
- ISBN: 9781250164629
- Preceded by: The Year's Best Science Fiction: Thirty-Fourth Annual Collection

The Year's Best Science Fiction: Thirty-Fifth Annual Collection is an anthology of science fiction short stories edited by Gardner Dozois, the thirty-fifth volume in a series. It was first published in hardcover, trade paperback and ebook by St. Martin's Griffin in July 2018. This is the last book in the series due to the editor's death.

== Summary ==
The book collects 38 novellas, novelettes and short stories by various science fiction authors, with an introductory summation of the year, notes and concluding bibliography by the editor. The stories were previously published in 2017 in various science fiction and other magazines.

== Contents ==
1. The Moon Is Not a Battlefield, Indrapramit Das
2. My English Name, R.S. Benedict
3. An Evening with Severyn Grimes, Rich Larson
4. Vanguard 2.0, Carter Scholz
5. Starlight Express, Michael Swanwick
6. The Martian Obelisk, Linda Nagata
7. We Who Live in the Heart, Kelly Robson
8. Winter Timeshare, Ray Nayler
9. Dear Sarah, Nancy Kress
10. Night Passage, Alastair Reynolds
11. THE DRAGON THAT FLEW OUT OF THE SUN, Aliette de Bodard
12. WAITING OUT THE END OF THE WORLD IN PATTY’S PLACE CAFE, Naomi Kritzer
13. THE HUNGER AFTER YOU’RE FED, James S.A. Corey
14. ASSASSINS, Jack Skillingstead & Burt Courtier
15. THE MARTIAN JOB, Jaine Fenn
16. THE ROAD TO THE SEA, Lavie Tidhar
17. UNCANNY VALLEY, Greg Egan
18. THE WORDLESS, Indrapramit Das
19. PAN HUMANISM: HOPE AND PRAGMATICS, Jessica Barber and Sara Saab
20. ZIGEUNER, Harry Turtledove
21. THE PROVING GROUND, Alec Nevala-Lee
22. ZEN AND THE ART OF SPACESHIP MAINTENANCE, Tobias Buckell
23. THE INFLUENCE MACHINE, Sean McMullen
24. CANOE, Nancy Kress
25. THE HISTORY OF THE INVASION TOLD IN FIVE DOGS, Kelly Jennings
26. PRIME MEREDIAN, Silvia Moreno-Garcia
27. TRICERATOPS, Ian McHugh
28. MINES, Eleanor Arnason
29. THERE USED TO BE OLIVE TREES, Rich Larson
30. WHENDING MY WAY BACK HOME, Bill Johnson
31. DEATH ON MARS, Madeline Ashby
32. ELEPHANT ON TABLE, Bruce Sterling
33. NUMBER 39 SKINK, Suzanne Palmer
34. A SERIES OF STEAKS, Vina Jie-Min Prased
35. THE LAST BOAT-BUILDER IN BALLYVOLOON, Finbarr O'Reilley
36. THE RESIDUE OF FIRE, Robert Reed
37. SIDEWALKS, Maureen F. McHugh
38. NEXUS, Michael F. Flynn
