= Chris Beckett =

British social worker, university lecturer, and science fiction author

- Born: 1955 (age 70–71)
- Occupations: Social worker, senior lecturer, novelist
- Writing career
- Genre: Science fiction
- Website: www.chris-beckett.com

Chris Beckett (born 1955) is a British social worker, university lecturer, and science fiction author. He has written several textbooks, dozens of short stories, and six novels.

== Background ==
Beckett was educated at the Dragon School in Oxford and Bryanston School in Dorset, England. He holds a BSc (Honours) degree in Psychology from the University of Bristol (1977), a CQSW from the University of Wales (1981), a Diploma in Advanced Social Work from Goldsmiths, University of London (1977), and an MA in English Studies from Anglia Ruskin University (ARU), Cambridge (2005). He has been a senior lecturer in social work at ARU since 2000. He was a social worker for eight years and the manager of a children and families social work team for ten years. Beckett has authored or co-authored several textbooks and scholarly articles on social work.

== Works ==
=== Science fiction ===
Beckett began writing science fiction short stories in 1990 and had his first science fiction novel, The Holy Machine, published in 2004. He published his second novel in 2009 — titled Marcher, based on a short story of the same name. (The Holy Machine and Marcher were issued by Cosmos in 2009 as mass market paperbacks.) Paul Di Filippo reviewed The Holy Machine for Asimov's Science Fiction, calling it "One of the most accomplished novel debuts to attract my attention in some time...", Michael Levy in StrangeHorizons called it "a beautifully written and deeply thoughtful tale about a would-be scientific utopia that has been bent sadly out of shape by both external and internal pressures." and a review in Interzone by Tony Ballantyne declared, "Let's waste no time: this book is incredible."His latest novel, Dark Eden was called by Stuart Kelly, of The Guardian, "a superior piece of the theologically nuanced science fiction". While Valerie O'Riordan, in Bookmunch, called it "a science-fiction dystopian tale in the vein of Russell Hoban's Ridley Walker or Patrick Ness's YA trilogy, Chaos Walking – or, if we're to go classical and mainstream, maybe Lord of the Flies" and "a character study of unconscious political ambition".

Beckett has written over 20 short stories, many of them originally published in Interzone and Asimov's. Several of his short stories have appeared among the top three favourites in Interzone's annual readers' polls. Several have also been selected for republication, including in volumes 9, 19, 20, and 23 of The Year's Best Science Fiction, volumes 5 and 6 of the Year's Best SF, Robots and A.I.s in the Jack Dann and Gardner Dozois Ace anthology series.

=== Social work ===
Beckett is also the author of several social work textbooks. These include Essential Theory for Social Work Practice and Human Growth and Development. The latter is an introduction to emotional, psychological, intellectual and social development across a human lifetime. It is written for students training in fields such as social work, healthcare and education; the book covers topics which are central to understanding people, whether they are clients, service users, patients or pupils.

== Bibliography ==
=== Novels ===
- The Holy Machine, Wildside Press, 2004, ISBN 978-1-59224-208-5
- Marcher, Dorchester Publishing, 2009, ISBN 978-0-8439-6197-3 (a revised version was published by NewCon press in 2014)
- America City, Atlantic Books, 2017, ISBN 978-178649-152-7
- Beneath the World, A Sea, Atlantic Books, 2019, ISBN 978-178649-157-2
- Two Tribes, Atlantic Books, 2020, ISBN 978-178649-932-5
- Tomorrow, Atlantic Books, 2021, ISBN 978-178649-935-6

Eden series

1. Dark Eden, Corvus, 2012, ISBN 978-1-84887-463-3 (winner of the 2013 Arthur C. Clarke Award)
2. Mother of Eden. London: Corvus. 2015.
3. Daughter of Eden, Corvus, 2016, ISBN 978-178239-238-5

=== Short fiction ===
Collections

- The Turing Test, Elastic Press, 2008, ISBN 978-0-9553181-8-4.
  It comprises: "Karel's Prayer", "Dark Eden", "The Perimeter", "Piccadilly Circus", "We Could be Sisters", "Monsters", "The Turing Test", "Snapshots of Apirania", "The Gates of Troy", "The Marriage of Sky and Sea", "Valour", "The Warrior Half-and-Half", "Jazamine in the Green Wood", and "La Macchina".
- The Peacock Cloak, NewCon Press, 2013, ISBN 978-1-907069-49-9.
  It comprises: "Atomic Truth", "Two Thieves", "Johnny's New Job", "The Caramel Forest", "Greenland", "The Famous Cave Paintings on Isolus 9", "Rat Island", "Day 29", "Our Land", "The Desiccated Man", "Poppyfields" and "The Peacock Cloak".

Stories

- "A Matter of Survival" – originally published in Interzone (1990)
- "La Macchina" – originally published in Interzone (1991); republished in The Year's Best Science Fiction: Ninth Annual Collection (1992); republished in Gedanken Fictions: Stories on Themes in Science, Technology and Society, edited by Thomas Easton, Wildside Press (2000); republished in Robots (2005)
- "The Long Journey of Frozen Heart" – originally published in Interzone (1991)
- "The Circle of Stones" – originally published in Interzone (1992)
- "The Welfare Man" – originally published in Interzone (1993); republished in The Best of Interzone, edited by David Pringle, Voyager (HarperCollins) (1997); truncated version published in Health and Disease: a Reader, Open University Press (1995)
- "Jazamine in the Green Wood" – originally published in Interzone (1994)
- "The Warrior Half-and-Half" – originally published in Interzone (1995); republished in Year's Best SF 5 (2000); republished in The Ant Men of Tibet, edited by David Pringle, Big Engine Books (2001)
- "Valour" – originally published in Interzone (1999); republished in Year's Best SF 5 (2000)
- "The Marriage of Sky and Sea" – originally published in Interzone (2000); republished in Year's Best SF 6 (2001)
- "The Gates of Troy" – originally published in Interzone (2000)
- "The Welfare Man Retires" – originally published in Interzone (2000)
- "Snapshots of Apirania" – originally published in Interzone (2000)
- "Marcher" – originally published in Interzone (2001); republished in The Year's Best Science Fiction: Nineteenth Annual Collection (2002)
- "Watching the Sea" – originally published in Interzone (2001)
- "To Become a Warrior" – originally published in Interzone (2002); republished in The Year's Best Science Fiction: Twentieth Annual Collection (2003)
- "The Turing Test" – originally published in Interzone (2002); republished in A.I.s, edited by Gardner Dozois and Jack Dann, Ace Books (2004)
- "Monsters" – originally published in Interzone (2003)
- "Tammy Pendant" – originally published in Asimov's Science Fiction (2004)
- "We Could be Sisters" – originally published in Asimov's Science Fiction (2004)
- "Picadilly Circus" – originally published in Interzone (2005); republished in The Year's Best Science Fiction: Twenty-Third Annual Collection (2006); reprinted in Russian in Esli magazine
- "The Perimeter" – originally published in Asimov's Science Fiction (2005); reprinted in Russian in Esli magazine
- "Dark Eden" – originally published in Asimov's Science Fiction (March 2006)
- "Karel's Prayer" – originally published in Interzone (2006)
- "Rat Island" – originally published in Interzone (2008)
- "Poppyfields" – originally published in Interzone (2008)
- "Greenland" – originally published in Interzone (2008)
- "Atomic Truth" – originally published in Asimov's Science Fiction (2009)
- "The Famous Cave Paintings on Isolus 9" – originally published in Postscripts (2009)
- "Johnny's New Job" – originally published in Interzone (2010)
- "Our Land" – originally published in Conflicts (2010)
- "The Peacock Cloak" – originally published in Asimov's Science Fiction (2010)
- "The Desiccated Man" – originally published in Postscripts (2010)
- "Two Thieves" – originally published in Asimov's Science Fiction (2011)
- "Day 29" – originally published in Asimov's Science Fiction (July 2011)
- "The Goblin Hunter" – originally published in Solaris Rising 3 (2014)

Title	Year	First published	Reprinted/collected	Notes
The caramel forest	2012	Beckett, Chris (December 2012). "The caramel forest". Asimov's Science Fiction. Vol. 36, no. 12. pp. 10–24.		

=== Non-fiction ===
- Essential Theory for Social Work Practice, Sage, 2006
- Values and Ethics in Social Work: An Introduction, Sage, 2005 (co-written with Andrew Maynard)
- Social Work Assessment and Intervention in Social Work, Russell House, 2003 (co-written with Steven Walker)
- Child Protection: An Introduction, Sage, 2003; 2nd Edition, 2007
- Human Growth and Development, Sage, 2002

=== Critical studies and reviews of Beckett's work ===
Mother of Eden

- Sakers, Don (October 2015). "The Reference Library". Analog Science Fiction and Fact. 135 (10): 105–108.

== Interviews ==
- The October 2008 issue of Interzone contains an interview with the author by Andrew Hedgecock. The same issue contains three of his short stories.
