= The Year's Best Science Fiction: Third Annual Collection =

1986 short story anthology

- Editor: Gardner Dozois
- Language: English
- Series: The Year's Best Science Fiction
- Genre: Science fiction
- Publisher: St. Martin's Griffin (Bluejay Books)
- Publication date: 1986
- Publication place: United States
- Media type: Print (hardcover & trade paperback)
- Pages: 624 pp
- ISBN: 9780312944872
- OCLC: 14871394
- Preceded by: The Year's Best Science Fiction: Second Annual Collection
- Followed by: The Year's Best Science Fiction: Fourth Annual Collection

The Year's Best Science Fiction: Third Annual Collection is a collection of science fiction short stories edited by Gardner Dozois and published in 1986.

== Contents ==
- "The Jaguar Hunter" by Lucius Shepard
- "Dogfight" by Michael Swanwick and William Gibson
- "Fermi and Frost" by Frederik Pohl
- "Green Days in Brunei" by Bruce Sterling
- "Snow" by John Crowley
- "The Fringe" by Orson Scott Card
- "The Lake Was Full of Artificial Things" by Karen Joy Fowler
- "Sailing to Byzantium" by Robert Silverberg
- "Solstice" by James Patrick Kelly
- "Duke Pasquale's Ring" by Avram Davidson
- "More Than the Sum of His Parts" by Joe Haldeman
- "Out of All Them Bright Stars" by Nancy Kress
- "Side Effects" by Walter Jon Williams
- "The Only Neat Thing to Do" by James Tiptree, Jr.
- "Dinner in Audoghast" by Bruce Sterling
- "Under Siege" by George R. R. Martin
- "Flying Saucer Rock & Roll" by Howard Waldrop
- "A Spanish Lesson" by Lucius Shepard
- "Roadside Rescue" by Pat Cadigan
- "Paper Dragons" by James P. Blaylock
- "Magazine Section" by R. A. Lafferty
- "The War at Home" by Lewis Shiner
- "Rockabye Baby" by S.C. Sykes
- "Green Mars" by Kim Stanley Robinson
