= The Year's Best Science Fiction: First Annual Collection =

1984 science fiction anthology edited by Gardner Dozois

- Editor: Gardner Dozois
- Language: English
- Series: The Year's Best Science Fiction
- Genre: Science fiction
- Publisher: St. Martin's Griffin (Bluejay Books)
- Publication date: April 1984
- Publication place: United States
- Media type: Print (hardcover & trade paperback)
- Pages: 575 pp
- ISBN: 9780312944834
- OCLC: 10559611
- Followed by: The Year's Best Science Fiction: Second Annual Collection

The Year's Best Science Fiction: First Annual Collection is a science fiction anthology edited by Gardner Dozois that was published in 1984. It is the 1st of 35 in The Year's Best Science Fiction series. It is available in the Kindle format.

== Contents ==
- "Cicada Queen [Mechanist-Shapers]" by Bruce Sterling
- "Beyond the Dead Reef" by James Tiptree, Jr.
- "Slow-Birds" by Ian Watson
- "Vulcan’s Forge" by Poul Anderson
- "Man-Mountain Gentian" by Howard Waldrop
- "Hardfought" by Greg Bear
- "Manifest Destiny" by Joe Haldeman
- "Full Chicken Richness" by Avram Davidson
- "Multiples" by Robert Silverberg
- "Cryptic" by Jack McDevitt
- "The Sidon in the Mirror" by Connie Willis
- "Golden Gate" by R. A. Lafferty
- "Blind Shemmy" by Jack Dann
- "In the Islands" by Pat Murphy
- "Nunc Dimittis" by Tanith Lee
- "Blood Music" by Greg Bear
- "Her Furry Face" by Leigh Kennedy
- "Knight of Shallows" by Rand B. Lee
- "The Cat" by Gene Wolfe
- "The Monkey Treatment" by George R. R. Martin
- "Nearly Departed [Deadpan Allie]" by Pat Cadigan
- "Hearts Do Not in Eyes Shine" by John Kessel
- "Carrion Comfort" by Dan Simmons
- "Gemstone" by Vernor Vinge
- "Black Air" by Kim Stanley Robinson
