= The Year's Best Science Fiction: Thirty-Third Annual Collection =

2016 anthology edited by Gardner Dozois

- Dust jacket of 1st edition
- Editor: Gardner Dozois
- Cover artist: Jim Burns
- Language: English
- Series: The Year's Best Science Fiction
- Genre: Science fiction
- Publisher: St. Martin's Press
- Publication date: 2016
- Publication place: United States
- Media type: Print (hardcover & trade paperback)
- Pages: xxxix & 675 pp.
- ISBN: 9781250080837
- Preceded by: The Year's Best Science Fiction: Thirty-Second Annual Collection
- Followed by: The Year's Best Science Fiction: Thirty-Fourth Annual Collection

The Year's Best Science Fiction: Thirty-Third Annual Collection is an anthology of science fiction short stories edited by Gardner Dozois, the thirty-third volume in an ongoing series. It was first published in hardcover, trade paperback and ebook by St. Martin's Press in July 2016. The first British edition was published in trade paperback by Robinson in July 2016, under the alternate title The Mammoth Book of Best New SF 29.

== Summary ==
The book collects thirty-six novellas, novelettes and short stories by various science fiction authors, with an introductory summation of the year, notes and concluding bibliography by the editor. The stories were previously published in 2015 in various science fiction and other magazines.

== Contents ==
Summation: 2015 (Gardner Dozois)

- "The Falls: A Luna Story" (Ian McDonald)
- "Three Cups of Grief, by Starlight" (Aliette de Bodard)
- "Ruins" (Eleanor Arnason)
- "Another Word for World" (Ann Leckie)
- "Meshed" (Rich Larson)
- "Emergence" (Gwyneth Jones)
- "Gypsy" (Carter Scholz)
- "The Astrakhan, the Homburg, and the Red Red Coal" (Chaz Brenchley)
- "The Muses of Shuyedan-18" (Indrapramit Das)
- "Bannerless" (Carrie Vaughn)
- "The Audience" (Sean McMullen)
- "Rates of Change" (Daniel Abraham and Ty Franck (as by James S. A. Corey))
- "Calved" (Sam J. Miller)
- "Botanica Veneris: Thirteen Papercuts by Ida Countess Rathangan" (Ian McDonald)
- "Consolation" (John Kessel)
- "The Children of Gal" (Allen M. Steele)
- "Today I Am Paul" (Martin L. Shoemaker)
- "City of Ash" (Paolo Bacigalupi)
- "Trapping the Pleistocene" (James Sarafin)
- "Machine Learning" (Nancy Kress)
- "Inhuman Garbage" (Kristine Kathryn Rusch)
- "Planet of Fear" (Paul McAuley)
- "It Takes More Muscles to Frown" (Ned Beauman)
- "The Daughters of John Demetrius" (Joe Pitkin)
- "Silence Like Diamonds" (John Barnes)
- "Billy Tumult" (Nick Harkaway)
- "Hello, Hello; Can You Hear Me, Hello" (Seanan McGuire)
- "Capitalism in the 22nd Century or A.I.r." (Geoff Ryman)
- "Ice" (Rich Larson)
- "The First Gate of Logic" (Benjamin Rosenbaum)
- "In Panic Town, on the Backward Moon" (Michael F. Flynn)
- "The Three Resurrections of Jessica Churchill" (Kelly Robson)
- "No Placeholder for You, My Love" (Nick Wolven)
- "The Game of Smash and Recovery" (Kelly Link)
- "A Stopped Clock" (Madeline Ashby)
- "The Citadel of Weeping Pearls" (Aliette de Bodard)

Honorable Mentions: 2015 (Gardner Dozois)

== Awards ==
The anthology placed fifth in the 2017 Locus Poll Award for Best Anthology.
