= Wolven =

Wolven can refer to:

- Jonge wolven, album by Clouseau
- Nick Wolven, American science fiction author
- Rico Wolven (born 1990), Dutch footballer
