= Wake Up and Dream =

Wake Up and Dream may refer to:

- Wake Up and Dream (musical), a 1929 musical revue
- Wake Up and Dream (1934 film), an American musical film
- Wake Up and Dream (1946 film), a Technicolor film
- Wake Up and Dream (novel), a 2011 science fiction novel by Ian R. MacLeod
