= The Coon Rolled Down and Ruptured His Larinks, A Squeezed Novel by Mr. Skunk =

1990 novelette by Dafydd ab Hugh

"The Coon Rolled Down and Ruptured His Larinks, a Squeezed Novel by Mr. Skunk" is a 1990 science fiction novelette by American writer Dafydd ab Hugh.

== Background ==
The book was originally published in Isaac Asimov's Science Fiction Magazine in August 1990, and subsequently republished in The Year's Best Science Fiction: Eighth Annual Collection (edited by Gardner Dozois), in Best New SF 5 (also edited by Dozois), and in Nebula Awards 26 (edited by James K. Morrow).

The story is set in a post-apocalyptic world where all animals have acquired human-level intelligence and the ability to speak – and all humans have become intellectually disabled. This state of human-animal equality is known as "democrazy" [sic]. At one point in the story, the main character and his female dog kill and eat a cat, who has unsuccessfully begged for its life. Later, the man copulates with the dog.

The title is a reference to the Xhosa language tongue twister, "Iqaqa laziqikaqika kwaze kwaqhawaka uqhoqhoqha" (translated: "The skunk rolled down and ruptured its larynx").

== Reception ==
The Encyclopedia of Science Fiction describes "The Coon Rolled Down and Ruptured his Larinks, a Squeezed Novel by Mr. Skunk" as 'striking' and compares its 'linguistic invention' to that of Riddley Walker.

In 1991, "Ruptured" was nominated for both the Hugo Award for Best Novelette and the Nebula Award for Best Novelette.
