= Voyages by Starlight =

1996 collection of science fiction and horror stories by Ian R. MacLeod

- Dust-jacket illustration by Nicholas Jainschigg.
- Author: Ian R. MacLeod
- Cover artist: Nicholas Jainschigg
- Language: English
- Genre: Science fiction, horror
- Publisher: Arkham House
- Publication date: 1996
- Publication place: United States
- Media type: Print (hardback)
- Pages: xii, 269
- ISBN: 0-87054-171-4
- OCLC: 34772339
- Dewey Decimal: 823/.914 20
- LC Class: PR6063.A24996 V69 1996

Voyages by Starlight is a collection of science fiction and horror stories by British writer Ian R. MacLeod. It was released in 1996 and was the author's first book. It was published by Arkham House in an edition of 2,542 copies. The stories originally appeared in Isaac Asimov's Science Fiction Magazine, The Magazine of Fantasy and Science Fiction and Weird Tales.

== Contents ==
Voyages by Starlight contains the following stories:

1. "Introduction", by Michael Swanwick
2. "Ellen O’Hara"
3. "Green"
4. "Starship Day"
5. "The Giving Mouth"
6. "The Perfect Stranger"
7. "Tirkiluk"
8. "Papa"
9. "1/72nd Scale"
10. "Marnie"
11. "Grownups"

== Sources ==
- Chalker, Jack L.; Mark Owings (1998). The Science-Fantasy Publishers: A Bibliographic History, 1923-1998. Westminster, MD and Baltimore: Mirage Press, Ltd. p. 60.
- Joshi, S.T. (1999). Sixty Years of Arkham House: A History and Bibliography. Sauk City, WI: Arkham House. p. 170. ISBN 0-87054-176-5.
- Nielsen, Leon (2004). Arkham House Books: A Collector's Guide. Jefferson, NC and London: McFarland & Company, Inc. p. 141. ISBN 0-7864-1785-4.
