= A Braver Thing =

1990 science fiction novelette by Charles Sheffield

"A Braver Thing" is a science fiction novelette by English-American writer Charles Sheffield. It was first published in Isaac Asimov's Science Fiction Magazine in February 1990, and subsequently republished in The Year's Best Science Fiction: Eighth Annual Collection (1991), in Sheffield's collection Dancing With Myself (1993), and in Visions of Wonder (1996); it was also translated into Italian and published (as "Qualcosa di eccezionale") in Supernovæ (1993) and Millemondi Primavera 1996 (1996).

== Synopsis ==
Giles Turnbull has been awarded a Nobel Prize in Physics. As he prepares to give his acceptance speech, he considers the events in his life which led him to this juncture—in particular, his friendship with someone smarter.

== Reception ==
"Braver" was a finalist for the 1991 Hugo Award for Best Novelette, and the 1991 Locus Award for Best Novelette. Publishers Weekly called it "(a)s much science mystery as science fiction".
