= Dark Eden (novel) =

2012 novel by Chris Beckett

- Original UK cover from 2012
- Author: Chris Beckett
- Language: English
- Genre: Social science fiction
- Publisher: Corvus
- Publication date: 2012
- Publication place: United Kingdom
- Media type: Print (hardback & paperback)
- Pages: 400
- ISBN: 9781848874640
- OCLC: 869300938
- Followed by: Mother of Eden

Dark Eden is a social science fiction novel by British author Chris Beckett, first published in the United Kingdom in 2012. The novel explores the disintegration of a small group of a highly inbred people, descendants of two individuals whose spaceship crashed on a rogue planet they call Eden. It is the first in the Eden trilogy, followed by Mother of Eden and Daughter of Eden.

The book won the Arthur C. Clarke Award for best science fiction novel published in the United Kingdom in 2012.

== Plot summary ==
The novel begins about 160 years after two human beings, Angela and Tommy, are stranded on Eden. Their three companions—Mehmet, Michael, and Dixon—have left in a damaged spaceship to get help. Years have passed, and although Angela and Tommy initially held out hope for rescue, they begin to raise children, forming a new society which becomes known as "Family". Frequent and regular incest among their descendants is common, with few children knowing who their father is. Social life centers around powerful rituals: Retelling of story of the stranding, the worship of what few relics remain, myths about Earth, and the need to stay close to Circle—the place where the landing vehicle originally set down, and is supposed to return to and bring them back to Earth. Social norms are strongly adhered to in this matriarchy, and innovation is rare.

Family lives in Circle Valley. Resources are stretched but they believe that leaving will make it hard for them to be found when Earth returns for them. Eden's animals each have two hearts, green-black blood, huge and lidless eyes, six legs, and tentacled feelers around their mouths. Trees tap into the heat just below Eden's surface, bringing up warmth and providing fruit and other food. Nearly all plant and animal life on Eden is bioluminescent, allowing the humans to see, while overhead the Milky Way can be easily seen at all times.

The novel centers around John Redlantern, a "newhair" (teenager) who begins to resent the deep social and technological conservatism of Family. Killing a deadly leopard proves to be an epiphany which opens his eyes to the Malthusian catastrophe facing Family, which has grown too large for its tiny valley. Supported by pretty Tina Spiketree and John's cousins (the passive Gerry and the club footed pre-adolescent, thoughtful Jeff), John engages in a series of iconoclastic acts which lead to the "breaking" of Family. Exile of John and his teenaged followers is only the first of many ramifications, as John leads a messianic quest for a land "over Cold Dark" where Family can grow and thrive.

== Themes ==
The novel is told in the first-person voice by various characters, and each short chapter is told from a different character's perspective. Linguistic drift has given the people of Eden unique nouns ("police veekle", "rayed yoh", and "Jesus Juice" instead of "police vehicle", "radio", and "Jesus and the Jews"). The adverb "very" has dropped from the language, and emphasis is created by reduplication ("bad bad" instead of "very bad"). Linguistic relativity has yet to set in, so that Family lacks words to describe much of their world ("Cold Dark" instead of "high, dark mountain wreathed in glaciers"). Beckett said he adopted the unsophisticated, childish language of the Edenites after realizing he had crafted a society in which "the Eden settlers were a bunch of kids and two adults... . There's no external adult world as a reference point". With the two adults constantly speaking baby-talk to their children, pre-teens and teens never adopted more adult ways of speaking.

Beckett intended the novel to be "the Bible story...turned on its head", one in which people are "expelled to Eden". He conceived the novel after realizing that much of the Old Testament consisted of "small domestic stories elevated to a mythical level", and he established the social norms, rituals, and myths of Family around similar stories.

Beckett also wanted to explore themes about making hard choices. To think outside the box sometimes requires not only "transgressive" but extremely "cruel" behavior, he told Kirkus Reviews. The ramifications of John Redlantern's transgression, he noted, also has a wide number of unintended ramifications. The novel explores a socially and theologically conservative society's reaction to this transgression, which at first leads to a reactionary response. Only later does it lead to social upheaval in ways some characters predict (most notably Tina Spiketree's fears of patriarchy) but in ways no one can anticipate. Beckett said much of the latter part of the novel is about how positive, creative new ways of thinking can still harm people badly, and force people to make sacrifices they do not wish to make.

== Critical reception and awards ==
Dark Eden was author Chris Beckett's second novel. Reviews were generally very positive in the United Kingdom. Stuart Kelly in The Guardian called it a "superior piece of theologically nuanced science fiction", although he noted that the novel drew a little heavily on Russell Hoban's Riddley Walker and Will Self's The Book of Dave. Author Paul Di Filippo, reviewing the book for Locus magazine, described the plot as uninventive but "so splendidly [written] it feels brand new and remade". He pointed out that the novel's "harsh oasis" plot device resembled the work of Fritz Leiber, Stephen Baxter, Larry Niven, and Karl Schroeder. But that didn't matter: "[A]ll this heavy categorizing misses the essence of the reader’s first contact with the book, which is pure astonishment and pleasure, a storytelling ride full of brio and wonder. ... The reader is swiftly seduced by two things that are intrinsic to, but separate from, the powerful plot: the Carrollian language, and the freaky ecology." He had high praise for the character of John Redlantern, who was a metaphor (in De Filippo's mind) for both Moses and Cain. David Langford in The Daily Telegraph said Dark Eden contained "A classic theme, beautifully told".

Dark Eden was published in the United States in April 2014 by Broadway Books. American reviewers were much more critical of the book. In Kirkus Reviews, an anonymous reviewer called it "[a]bsorbing if often familiar, inventive and linguistically adept but less than fully satisfying... Enjoyable but no blockbuster." Author N. K. Jemisin, reviewing the novel in The New York Times, praised Beckett's method of rendering "the terror of the darkness beyond the forests with a riveting deftness" and the way he "cleverly" introduced new challenges and threats to keep the reader interested. But she strongly criticized the plot for being predictable and hackneyed and the characters for being clichéd. She had harsh words for what she saw as "the 1950s ethos underpinning the whole thing. The Family has developed into a relatively peaceful communal society that venerates its elders and has necessarily relaxed sexual norms; the society John seeks to create instead is monogamous, individualistic, rife with subtle bigotries and rooted in murder. Survival and progress, the story seems to suggest, require these things." Publishers Weekly thought the novel "hew[ed] too closely to historical patterns", and declared the climax very unsatisfying. The reviewer still found the changing narrative viewpoints, ecological setting, and linguistic devices interesting, however.

=== Awards ===
Dark Eden won the 2013 Arthur C. Clarke Award for the best science fiction novel published in the United Kingdom in 2012. Clarke Award judge Andrew M. Butler, noting why the judges gave the award to a new author rather than an established writer, said of the book, "Dark Eden fuses rich biological and sociological speculation. Beckett really makes you care for characters who are stranded light years from an Earth they have never really known."
