= The Light Ages =

Novel by Ian R. MacLeod

- First edition (US)
- Author: Ian R. MacLeod
- Language: English
- Genre: Fantasy fiction, Steampunk, Alternative history
- Publisher: Earthlight (UK); Ace Books (US)
- Publication date: May 2003
- Publication place: United Kingdom
- Media type: Print (Hardcover)
- Pages: 464
- ISBN: 0743462424
- Followed by: The House of Storms

The Light Ages is a steampunkalternate history fantasy novel by Ian R. MacLeod. The novel is set in an alternate Victorian England during an Industrial Revolution fueled by a dangerous magical substance known as aether.

== Plot ==
The Light Ages takes place in an industrializing England that relies on the mining of aether, a magical fifth element. Society is structured by a rigid labor caste system of guilds. The narrator and protagonist of the novel, Robert Borrows, belongs to a lowly guild in a Yorkshire mining village. He eventually journeys to London, where he joins a group of thieves, pickpockets, and revolutionaries who seek to overthrow the caste system.

=== Publication history ===
- 2003, UK, Earthlight (a former imprint of Simon & Schuster) ISBN 0743462424, Pub date May 2003, Hardback
- 2003, US, Ace Books ISBN 0441010555, Pub date May 2003, Hardback
- 2004, UK, Simon & Schuster ISBN 0743462440, Pub date 5 April 2004, Paperback
- 2004, US, Ace Trade, ISBN 0441011497, Pub date 6 April 2004, Paperback

== Literary significance and reception ==
The novel was received favorably. Jon Courtenay Grimwood, writing in The Guardian, described it as "[a] quiet, understated monster of a novel". Publishers Weekly noted the novel's strong character development and "gritty, alternate London" and recommended it to readers "who love the more sophisticated fantasy of Michael Swanwick, John Crowley or even China Miéville."

The novel won nominated for a World Fantasy Award in 2004. Because of its favorable reviews and broader publishing promotion, it has been described by critics as MacLeod's "breakthrough" work.
