= The Girl-Thing Who Went Out for Sushi =

2012 short story by Pat Cadigan

"The Girl-Thing who Went Out for Sushi" is a science fiction short story by American writer Pat Cadigan. It was published in 2012, in the anthology Edge of Infinity from Solaris Books.

== Plot ==
A group of workers live in the orbit of Jupiter, where they assist in ongoing scientific research. All the workers have "gone out for sushi" — that is, they have had themselves converted into forms resembling marine life (the narrator is an octopus) in order to better function in microgravity. However, this transformation has also made them into a political underclass relative to the normal humans.

== Reception ==
"Sushi" won the 2013 Hugo Award for Best Novelette, the 2013 Locus Award for Best Novelette, and the 2015 Seiun Award for Best Translated Short Story.
