= Burn (novella) =

2005 novella by James Patrick Kelly

- First edition
- Author: James Patrick Kelly
- Cover artist: John Picacio
- Language: English
- Genre: Science fiction novella
- Publisher: Tachyon Publications
- Publication date: 2005
- Publication place: United States
- Media type: Print
- Pages: 178
- ISBN: 978-1892391278 (first edition, hardcover)
- OCLC: 62724900
- Dewey Decimal: 813.54
- LC Class: PS3561.E3942 B87 2005

"Burn" is a science fiction novella published in 2005 by James Patrick Kelly. It won the 2007 Nebula Award for Best Novella.

== Plot summary ==
The story follows Prosper Gregory Leung, a farmer who has been recruited to help fight forest fires on his home planet of Walden. After being injured in the line of duty, he is sent to recover in a hospital. There, he ends up contacting the High Gregory, a young ruler on the planet Kenning. In the course of talking with the High Gregory, Spur unknowingly brings the young "luck maker" and several other young diplomats to Walden.
