= Mindplayers =

1987 novel by Pat Cadigan

- First edition
- Author: Pat Cadigan
- Cover artist: Albert Rocarlos
- Language: English
- Genre: Science fiction
- Publisher: Bantam Spectra
- Publication date: July 1, 1987
- Publication place: United States
- Media type: Print (hardback & paperback)
- Pages: 276
- ISBN: 0-553-26585-7
- OCLC: 27787704

Mindplayers is a 1987 first novel by science fiction author Pat Cadigan.

== Plot summary ==
A dare goes awry when Allie tries on a stolen madcap and is afflicted with psychotic delusions that will not go away. "Cured" by a mindplayer, Allie is soon forced to become one herself or face a prison sentence as a "mind criminal".

== Reception ==
Analog Science Fact & Fiction said of Mindplayers and Cadigan, "Excellent stuff, perceptive, imaginative, subtle and penetrating. A pleasure to read, and a writer to admire." Fantasy Review called the novel "an energetic, intriguing, darkly humorous head-trip extravaganza." The novel was nominated for a Philip K. Dick Award in 1988.

J. Michael Caparula reviewed Mindplayers in Space Gamer/Fantasy Gamer No. 82. Caparula commented that "the individual scenes and characters are memorable, especially black-marketeer Jerry Wirehammer. Mindplayers comes off as a blueprint for a better novel, one that is hopefully in the works."
