= Tea from an Empty Cup =

1998 novel by Pat Cadigan

- Author: Pat Cadigan
- Cover artist: Bruce Jenson
- Language: English
- Genre: Science fiction
- Publisher: Tor Books
- Publication date: 1998
- Publication place: United States
- Media type: Print (Paperback)
- Pages: 218
- ISBN: 0-586-21842-4
- OCLC: 44828828

Tea from an Empty Cup is a 1998 cyberpunk novel by American writer Pat Cadigan.

== Plot summary ==
Tea From an Empty Cup is at its core a tightly plotted detective novel.

The story revolves around near mythical Japan, which has been destroyed in a vaguely described natural cataclysm several decades before the story opens. The generation that remembers "Old Japan" appears to have passed on. A virtual version of Japan has become a sort of Holy Grail for a core group of artificial reality addicts. Artificial Reality, or AR, like "post-apocalyptic Noo Yawk Sitty" has become immensely popular in an increasingly dreary overcrowded world, not just as a game, but as a way of life.

AR is not just a way of life, it turns out, but also of death, as homicide detective Dore Konstantin discovers when she is called upon to investigate the death of a young man in an artificial reality parlour and discovers he died the same way in the game as in reality. She therefore decides to investigate this young man's life within the artificial realities he frequented, even though the legal precedents already established mean that nothing she discovers is admissible as evidence because "Everything is a Lie" in AR. In the process she stumbles onto something far more complicated than a mere murder case.

In Tea from an Empty Cup's interwoven storyline, Yuki, a young ethnically Japanese woman is desperately looking for her boyfriend Tom, whom she fears has taken up with a mysterious and notorious woman named Joy Flower, becoming one of "Joy's Boyz", about whom a lot of nasty rumours circulate.

When Yuki seeks Joy Flower out, she immediately is taken into Joy's inner circle, becoming her personal assistant, which leads her, like Konstantin, into a voyage of discovery towards the central mystery of the book.
