= The Year's Best Science Fiction: Seventh Annual Collection =

1990 science fiction anthology edited by Gardner Dozois

- Editor: Gardner Dozois
- Language: English
- Series: The Year's Best Science Fiction
- Genre: Science fiction
- Publisher: St. Martin's Press
- Publication date: 1990
- Publication place: United States
- Media type: Print (hardcover & trade paperback)
- Pages: 575 pp
- ISBN: 9780312044510
- Preceded by: The Year's Best Science Fiction: Sixth Annual Collection
- Followed by: The Year's Best Science Fiction: Eighth Annual Collection

The Year's Best Science Fiction: Seventh Annual Collection is a science fiction anthology edited by Gardner Dozois that was published in 1990. It is the 7th in The Year's Best Science Fiction series and won the Locus Award for best Anthology in 1991.

== Contents ==
The book includes a 17-page summation by Dozois; 25 stories, all that first appeared in 1989, and each with a two-paragraph introduction by Dozois; and a referenced list of honorable mentions for the year. The stories are as follows.

- Judith Moffett: "Tiny Tango"
- Charles Sheffield: "Out of Copyright"
- Mike Resnick: "For I Have Touched the Sky"
- Gregory Benford: "Alphas"
- Connie Willis: "At the Rialto"
- Kathe Koja: "Skin Deep"
- Steven Popkes: "The Egg"
- Robert Silverberg: "Tales from the Venia Woods"
- William King: "Visiting the Dead"
- Bruce Sterling: "Dori Bangs"
- Lucius Shepard: "The Ends of the Earth"
- Nancy Kress: "The Price of Oranges"
- S. P. Somtow: "Lottery Night"
- Alexander Jablokov: "A Deeper Sea"
- Michael Swanwick: "The Edge of the World"
- Megan Lindholm: "Silver Lady and the Fortyish Man"
- Alan Brennert: "The Third Sex"
- Neal Barrett Jr.: "Winter on the Belle Fourche"
- Robert Silverberg: "Enter a Soldier. Later: Enter Another," which went on to win the 1990 Hugo Award for Best Novelette
- Robert Sampson: "Relationships"
- John Varley: "Just Another Perfect Day"
- Janet Kagan: "The Loch Moose Monster"
- Brian Stableford: "The Magic Bullet"
- Avram Davidson: "The Odd Old Bird"
- John Crowley: "Great Work of Time"
