= 10^16 to 1 =

"10^{16} to 1"
- Short story by James Patrick Kelly
- Country: United States
- Language: English
- Genre: Science fiction

Publication
- Published in: Asimov's Science Fiction Magazine
- Publication type: Magazine
- Publication date: June 1999

"10^{16} to 1" is a science fiction novelette by American writer James Patrick Kelly, first published in 1999. It was the winner of the 2000 Hugo Award for Best Novelette and was also nominated for the 2000 Locus award and Asimov's Reader Poll.

== Plot summary ==
The story follows Ray Beaumont, a 12-year-old boy living in New York during the Cuban Missile Crisis of October 1962. During the Cold War tensions of the time, Ray meets Cross, a man he believes is from the future. He offers Cross a temporary place to stay in his family's back yard bomb shelter and proceeds to acquire the items necessary for Cross's mission. When he does not tell his parents about Cross, and comes home one afternoon to find that his mother has discovered an intruder in the bomb shelter, events quickly spiral out of control and Ray becomes convinced that he is the only one able to understand the truth about World War III.
