= The Year's Best Science Fiction: Fourteenth Annual Collection =

1997 science fiction anthology edited by Gardner Dozois

- Editor: Gardner Dozois
- Language: English
- Series: The Year's Best Science Fiction
- Genre: Science fiction
- Publisher: St. Martin's Press
- Publication date: 1997
- Publication place: United States
- Media type: Print (hardback & paperback)
- Pages: 752 pp
- ISBN: 9780312157029 (hardcover) ISBN 9780312157036 (trade paperback)
- OCLC: 37149684
- Preceded by: The Year's Best Science Fiction: Thirteenth Annual Collection
- Followed by: The Year's Best Science Fiction: Fifteenth Annual Collection

The Year's Best Science Fiction: Fourteenth Annual Collection is a science fiction anthology edited by Gardner Dozois that was published in 1997. It is the 14th in The Year's Best Science Fiction series. The collection won the Locus Award for best anthology.

== Contents ==
The book includes a 50-page summation by Dozois; 28 stories, all that first appeared in 1996, and each with a two-paragraph introduction by Dozois; and a referenced list of honorable mentions for the year. The stories are as follows.

- Gregory Benford: "Immersion"
- Michael Swanwick: "The Dead"
- Nancy Kress: "The Flowers of Aulit Prison"
- Tony Daniel: "A Dry, Quiet War"
- James P. Blaylock: "Thirteen Phantasms"
- Bud Sparhawk: "Primrose and Thorn"
- John Kessel: "The Miracle of Ivar Avenue"
- Paul Park: "The Last Homosexual"
- Ian McDonald: "Recording Angel"
- Robert Silverberg: "Death Do Us Part"
- Jim Cowan: "The Spade of Reason"
- Maureen F. McHugh: "The Cost to Be Wise"
- Bruce Sterling: "Bicycle Repairman," which went on to win a 1997 Hugo Award for Best Novelette
- Gregory Feeley: "The Weighing of Ayre"
- Michael Cassuit: "The Longer Voyage"
- Mike Resnick: "The Land of Nod"
- Gwyneth Jones: "Red Sonja and Lessingham in Dreamland"
- Charles Sheffield: "The Lady Vanishes"
- Robert Reed: "Chrysalis"
- Steven Utley: "The Wind Over the World"
- William Barton: "Changes"
- Gene Wolfe: "Counting Cats in Zanzibar"
- Jonathan Lethem: "How We Got In Town and Out Again"
- Cherry Wilder: "Dr. Tilmann's Consultant: A Scientific Romance"
- Damien Broderick: "Schrodinger's Dog"
- Walter Jon Williams: "Foreign Devils"
- Stephen Baxter: "In the MSOB"
- Tony Daniel: "The Robot's Twilight Companion"
