= Dafydd ab Hugh =

American science-fiction author (1960–2026)

- Born: David M. Friedman; October 22, 1960; Los Angeles, California, US
- Died: June 6, 2026 (aged 65); Los Angeles, California, US
- Occupations: Author; novelist
- Years active: 1989–1999

Dafydd ab Hugh (October 22, 1960 - June 6, 2026) was an American science-fiction author.

On October 22, 1960, Dafydd ab Hugh was born in Los Angeles as David M. Friedman. An author of science fiction, The Encyclopedia of Science Fiction described ab Hugh as best known for his 1990 novelette, "The Coon Rolled Down and Ruptured His Larinks, a Squeezed Novel by Mr. Skunk", which was published in Asimov's Science Fiction and nominated for a Nebula Award.

Several of his books appeared on the USA Today best-selling books list.

== Bibliography ==
The Encyclopedia of Science Fiction lists 15 novels in its ab Hugh bibliography:

=== Jiana ===
- Heroing; or, How He Wound Down the World. New York: Baen Books. 1989.
- Warriorwards. New York: Baen Books. 1990.

=== Arthur War Lord ===
- Arthur War Lord. New York: Avon Books. 1994.
- Far Beyond the Wave. New York: Avon Books. 1994.

=== Star Trek ===
==== Deep Space Nine ====
- Fallen Heroes. New York: Pocket Books. 1994.
- Vengeance. New York: Pocket Books. 1998.
- The Conquered. New York: Pocket Books. 1999.
- The Courageous. New York: Pocket Books. 1999.
- The Liberated. New York: Pocket Books. 1999.

==== The Next Generation ====
- Balance of Power. New York: Pocket Books. 1995.

==== Voyager ====
- The Final Fury. New York: Pocket Books. 1996.

=== Doom ===
- With Linaweaver, Brad (1995). Knee-Deep in the Dead. New York: Pocket Books.
- With Linaweaver, Brad (1995). Hell on Earth. New York: Pocket Books.
- With Linaweaver, Brad (1995). Infernal Sky. New York: Pocket Books.
- With Linaweaver, Brad (1995). Endgame. New York: Pocket Books.
