= Lambing Season =

- Short story by Molly Gloss
- Country: United States
- Language: English
- Genre(s): Science fiction

Publication
- Published in: Isaac Asimov's Science Fiction Magazine
- Publication type: Magazine
- Publication date: July 2002

"Lambing Season" is a science fiction short story by American writer Molly Gloss, published in 2002. It was nominated for the 2003 Hugo Award for Best Short Story as well as the Nebula Award for Best Short Story.

== Plot summary ==
The story follows Delia, a woman who enjoys the solitude of herding sheep each summer. Along with her two dogs and flock of sheep she relishes the natural beauty, silence and long walks that come as part of her job. After one particularly trying evening, she sees a green and yellow flash arc across the sky. She goes to investigate and finds that an alien spaceship has landed on Earth.
