= Atlantic Books =

British publishing house

- Founded: February 2000; 26 years ago
- Founder: Toby Mundy
- Country of origin: United Kingdom
- Headquarters location: London
- Distribution: The Book Service
- Publication types: Books, ebooks
- Imprints: Corvus Books
- Official website: atlantic-books.co.uk

Atlantic Books is an independent British publishing house, with its headquarters in Ormond House in Bloomsbury, in the London Borough of Camden. It is perhaps best known for publishing Aravind Adiga's debut novel The White Tiger, which received the 40th Man Booker Prize in 2008, and for its long-standing relationship with the late Christopher Hitchens.

CEO Toby Mundy was listed by the Evening Standard as one of London's top 1000 most influential people in 2012.

== Background ==
Atlantic Books was founded in February 2000 by Toby Mundy. It was originally the UK subsidiary of the American independent publisher Grove/Atlantic Inc. Grove/Atlantic sold a majority stake in the company in 2009. Allen & Unwin became the majority owner in 2014.

=== Corvus ===
In 2010, Atlantic Books launched a new genre fiction imprint, Corvus, introducing the world of crime, fantasy historical and women's fiction, into the company's list. Corvus is home to the Douglas Brodie crime novels by Gordon Ferris, the Merrily Watkins Mysteries by Phil Rickman, and the Vespasian series written by Robert Fabbri. Other authors include Holly Seddon, Caroline Bond, Sanjida Kay, Jack Jordan, and Jacqueline Ward.

In 2013, Dark Eden by Chris Beckett, published by Corvus, won the Arthur C. Clarke Award – the most prestigious award for Science Fiction in Britain. The same year, Alif the Unseen by G. Willow Wilson won the World Fantasy Award for Best Novel.

In 2019, it was announced that editorial director, Sara O'Keeffe, was leaving the company. O'Keeffe had led the imprint for eight years, presiding over a number of successful publications, including Holly Seddon's debut break-out bestseller Try Not To Breathe and Megan Miranda's All The Missing Girls. O'Keeffe was also responsible for attracting established names including Minette Walters and Elizabeth Buchan. Sarah Hodgson, formerly deputy publishing director at HarperCollins, replaced O'Keeffe.

== Partnerships ==
Atlantic Books is a founding member of the Independent Alliance, a global alliance of ten UK publishers and their international partners, when it was formed by Faber and Faber in 2005. In 2009, Atlantic Books entered into a partnership with independent Australian publishers Allen & Unwin, enabling them to introduce their own titles to the Australian market and also to publish a few select Allen & Unwin titles in the UK.

== Accolades ==
- Atlantic Books won "Imprint and Editor of the Year" at The Bookseller Industry Awards in 2005 and 2009 as well as "Independent Publisher of the Year" at the same ceremony in 2009.

== See also ==
- Allen and Unwin
- Grove/Atlantic, Inc.
- List of English-language book publishing companies
- List of English-language literary presses
- List of largest UK book publishers
