= Wake Up and Dream (novel) =

2011 novel by Ian R. MacLeod

- First edition
- Author: Ian R. MacLeod
- Cover artist: Ben Baldwin
- Language: English
- Genre: Science fiction
- Publisher: PS Publishing
- Publication date: September 2011
- Publication place: United Kingdom
- Media type: Print (Hardcover)
- Pages: 337
- ISBN: 978-1-84863-194-6

Wake Up and Dream is a science fiction novel by British writer Ian R. MacLeod. The novel is set in an alternate version of the 1940s, where "feelies", a form of cinema that allows the audience to directly experience the emotions of the characters, are a primary form of entertainment, putting actors such as Clark Gable, the protagonist, out of work. This alternate Gable finds work as a Chandlerian private detective who uncovers a plot to use the feelies to turn the American public's attention away from the Second World War.

== Editions ==
In addition to the trade hardcover, there was a signed, slipcased, limited edition of 100 copies. Also, purchasers of books from the PS Publishing table at Eastercon 2011 would receive a free chapbook, "Hector Douglas Makes A Sale" containing the story of the same name by MacLeod, along with a short afterword on the origins of the story and the novel and the links between the two. In 2013, Wake Up and Dream was published as an e-book by Open Road Media.

== Literary significance and reception ==
Eric Brown, writing in The Guardian, received the novel favorably, adding that it was strong enough to win the Arthur C. Clarke Award. Publishers Weekly praised MacLeod's eye for detail and dialogue skills, concluding that MacLeod "expertly hits all the hard-boiled beats".

The novel won the Sidewise Award for Alternate History, Long Form in 2011.
