= Nick Wolven =

American author

- Born: Nicholas Wolven
- Citizenship: American
- Writing career
- Genre: Science fiction

Nick Wolven is an American author who writes science fictional books and short stories.

== Education ==
Wolven attended the Clarion Workshop in San Diego in 2007.

== Career ==
Wolven's first professional sale was the short story "An Art, Like Everything Else", published in Asimov's Science Fiction April–May 2008. It received positive reviews among bloggers with one blogger calling it the best story in the issue. It was called "a beautiful story with a tear-jerker ending" by Spiral Galaxy Reviews, while another said it was a "nice idea" but a "saccharine" execution. The story was republished in St Martin's Press's Year's Best Science Fiction of 2009.

Two other stories, "The LoveSling" and "Senor Hedor" also received positive reactions.

His story, "Angie's Errand", which dealt with gender issues in a post-catastrophe world, was the featured cover story for the December 2009 issue of Asimov's Science Fiction magazine. Wolven's other stories, "On the Horizon" and "Lost in the Memory Palace, I Found You," were published in the March 2010 and August 2011 issues of Asimov's Science Fiction, respectively.

== Personal life ==
He currently lives in Bronx, NY, and works at Barnard College Library. As of February 1, 2010, he had stopped updating his official blog.

Wolven is also a part-time drummer. He lists Stewart Copeland as one of his major influences.
