= A Cabin on the Coast =

- Short story by Gene Wolfe
- Country: United States
- Language: English
- Genre: Science fantasy

Publication
- Published in: The Magazine of Fantasy & Science Fiction
- Publication type: Magazine
- Publication date: February 1984

"A Cabin on the Coast" is a science fantasy short story by American writer Gene Wolfe, initially published in the February 1984 issue of The Magazine of Fantasy & Science Fiction and collected in Endangered Species (1989) and The Best Of Gene Wolfe (2009). It was nominated for the 1985 Nebula Award for Best Short Story as well as the 1985 Locus award.

== Plot summary ==
The story follows Timothy Ryan Neal, the son of a famous politician. When he takes his girlfriend to his father’s beach house (or cabin) he wakes up one morning to find her missing. Though the police suggest that she drowned in the ocean, Timothy is convinced that she was kidnapped by the mysterious ship he sees now and again in the sea. Concerned not only about her life, but also about his father’s reputation, he journeys out to try to make a deal with the ship.
