= The Year's Best Science Fiction =

Series of science fiction anthologies, 1984–2018

The Year's Best Science Fiction was a series of science fiction anthologies edited by American Gardner Dozois until his death in 2018. The series, which is unrelated to the similarly titled and themed Year's Best SF, was published by St. Martin's Griffin. The collections were produced annually for 35 years starting in 1984.

In the UK, the series was titled The Mammoth Book Of Best New Science Fiction and published by Robinson. The Fourth Annual Collection in the US, in 1987, became the first book of the "Mammoth series" in the UK. For the next five years, from 1988 through 1993, the UK series was titled Best New SF (#2 through #7).

== Best of the Best series ==
In 2005, Dozois edited the first "Best of the Best" compilation. A second volume was published in 2007. That compilation and the entire series were re-released as e-books in October 2012.

One year after Dozois's death, a "Very Best of the Best" was published, in 2019.

== Volumes ==
- The Year's Best Science Fiction: First Annual Collection (1984)
- The Year's Best Science Fiction: Second Annual Collection (1985)
- The Year's Best Science Fiction: Third Annual Collection (1986)
- The Year's Best Science Fiction: Fourth Annual Collection (1987)
- The Year's Best Science Fiction: Fifth Annual Collection (1988)
- The Year's Best Science Fiction: Sixth Annual Collection (1989)
- The Year's Best Science Fiction: Seventh Annual Collection (1990)
- The Year's Best Science Fiction: Eighth Annual Collection (1991)
- The Year's Best Science Fiction: Ninth Annual Collection (1992)
- The Year's Best Science Fiction: Tenth Annual Collection (1993)
- The Year's Best Science Fiction: Eleventh Annual Collection (1994)
- The Year's Best Science Fiction: Twelfth Annual Collection (1995)
- The Year's Best Science Fiction: Thirteenth Annual Collection (1996)
- The Year's Best Science Fiction: Fourteenth Annual Collection (1997)
- The Year's Best Science Fiction: Fifteenth Annual Collection (1998)
- The Year's Best Science Fiction: Sixteenth Annual Collection (1999)
- The Year's Best Science Fiction: Seventeenth Annual Collection (2000)
- The Year's Best Science Fiction: Eighteenth Annual Collection (2001)
- The Year's Best Science Fiction: Nineteenth Annual Collection (2002)
- The Year's Best Science Fiction: Twentieth Annual Collection (2003)
- The Year's Best Science Fiction: Twenty-First Annual Collection (2004)
  - Best of the Best: 20 Years of the Year's Best Science Fiction (2005) (Anthology from previous Year's Best Science Fiction editions)
- The Year's Best Science Fiction: Twenty-Second Annual Collection (2005)
- The Year's Best Science Fiction: Twenty-Third Annual Collection (2006)
  - Best of the Best Volume 2: 20 Years of the Year's Best Short Science Fiction Novels (2007) (Anthology from previous Year's Best Science Fiction editions)
- The Year's Best Science Fiction: Twenty-Fourth Annual Collection (2007)
- The Year's Best Science Fiction: Twenty-Fifth Annual Collection (2008)
- The Year's Best Science Fiction: Twenty-Sixth Annual Collection (2009)
- The Year's Best Science Fiction: Twenty-Seventh Annual Collection (2010)
- The Year's Best Science Fiction: Twenty-Eighth Annual Collection (2011)
- The Year's Best Science Fiction: Twenty-Ninth Annual Collection (2012)
- The Year's Best Science Fiction: Thirtieth Annual Collection (2013)
- The Year's Best Science Fiction: Thirty-First Annual Collection (2014)
- The Year's Best Science Fiction: Thirty-Second Annual Collection (2015)
- The Year's Best Science Fiction: Thirty-Third Annual Collection (2016)
- The Year's Best Science Fiction: Thirty-Fourth Annual Collection (2017)
- The Year's Best Science Fiction: Thirty-Fifth Annual Collection (2018)
  - The Very Best of the Best: 35 Years of The Year's Best Science Fiction (2019) (Anthology from previous Year's Best Science Fiction editions)
