= Molly Gloss =

American novelist

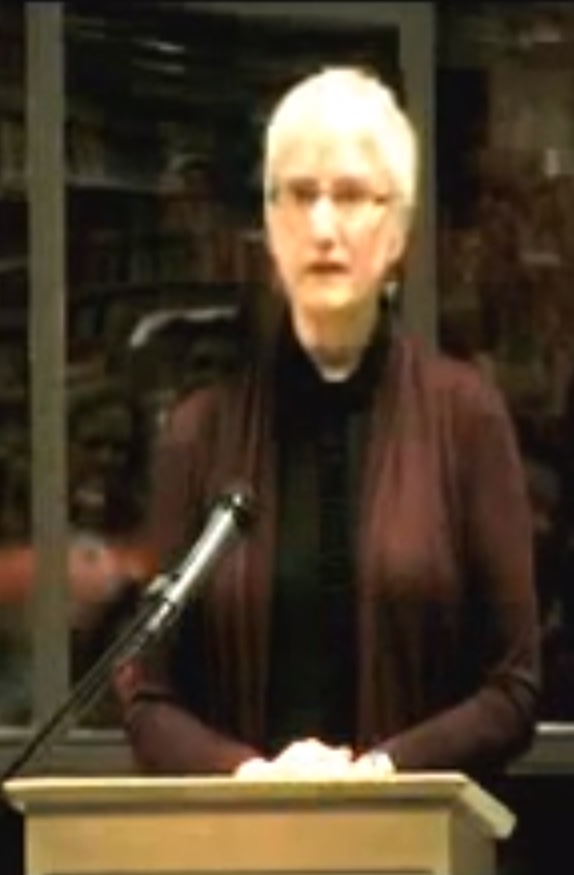
- Gloss at Eastern Oregon University in 2012
- Born: November 20, 1944 (age 80)
- Occupation: Writer
- Genre: Historical; science fiction
- Notable awards: Ken Kesey Award 1990 The Jump-Off Creek; Whiting Award 1996 in Fiction; James Tiptree, Jr. Award 2000 Wild Life

Molly Gloss (born November 20, 1944) is an American writer of historical fiction and science fiction.

== Life ==
Gloss grew up in rural Oregon and began writing seriously when she became a mother. She now lives in Portland, Oregon, and was close friends with fellow science fiction writer Ursula K. Le Guin. She has taught writing and literature of the American West at Portland State University, and currently is on the faculty of the Pacific University MFA program.

== Awards and nominations ==
- The Jump-Off Creek was a finalist for the PEN/Faulkner Award for Fiction and won both the 1990 Ken Kesey Award for the Novel and 1990 Pacific Northwest Booksellers Association Award
- 1996 Whiting Award in Fiction
- Wild Life was a finalist for the Oregon Book Award and won the 2000 James Tiptree, Jr. Award for work that explores or expands notions of gender
- The Hearts of Horses was a finalist for the 2008 Oregon Book Award
- “The Grinnell Method” won the Theodore Sturgeon Award for the short story in 2013
- Unforeseen was a World Fantasy finalist in 2020
- In 2021 Molly received the C.E.S. Wood Award “in recognition of an enduring, substantial literary career”

== Bibliography ==
=== Novels ===
- Outside the Gates. Atheneum. 1986. ISBN 978-0-689-31275-5.
- The Jump-Off Creek. Houghton Mifflin Company. 1989. ISBN 978-0-618-56587-0.
- The Dazzle of Day. Macmillan. 1998. ISBN 978-0-312-86437-8.
- Wild Life. Houghton Mifflin Harcourt. 2000. ISBN 978-0-618-13157-0.
- The Hearts of Horses. Houghton Mifflin Harcourt. 2007. ISBN 978-0-618-79990-9.
- Falling from Horses. Houghton Mifflin Harcourt. 2014. ISBN 978-0-544-27929-2.

=== Stories ===
- Unforeseen. Simon & Schuster. 2019. ISBN 978-1-481-49851-7.

=== Anthologies ===
- Beverly McFarland, ed. (1998). "The Doe". A Line of Cutting Women. CALYX Books. ISBN 978-0-934971-62-1.
- Kim Barnes; Mary Clearman Blew, eds. (2001). "from Jump Off Creek". Circle of Women: An Anthology of Contemporary Western Women Writers. University of Oklahoma Press. ISBN 978-0-8061-3367-6.

=== Notable short fiction ===
- "Personal Silence", 1990 (reprinted in The Year's Best Science Fiction 1991)
- "Lambing Season", 2002 (nominated for a Hugo Award for Best Short Story and a Nebula Award for Best Short Story)
