= Stable Strategies for Middle Management =

- Short story by Eileen Gunn
- Language: English
- Genre(s): Science fiction

Publication
- Published in: Isaac Asimov's Science Fiction Magazine
- Publication type: Magazine
- Publication date: June 1988

"Stable Strategies for Middle Management" is a science fiction short story published in 1988 by Eileen Gunn.

== Plot summary ==
Margaret is a corporate executive who, to prove her loyalty to the company, undergoes bioengineering that gradually transforms her into a giant insect.

== Reception ==
"Stable Strategies for Middle Management" was a finalist for the 1989 Hugo Award for Best Short Story.

Strange Horizons considered that it "must come high in any list of best SF short stories"; similarly, Michael Swanwick has placed it on his personal "short list (...) of the best short stories of the late twentieth century."

== Background ==
The story is inspired by Gunn's experiences as an advertising director at Microsoft.
