= Karen E. Taylor =

American novelist

- Born: Pittsburgh, Pennsylvania, United States
- Education: Grove City College
- Occupation: Novelist
- Known for: The Vampire Legacy series

Karen E. Taylor is an American novelist who is known for The Vampire Legacy series of novels, which has been published by Kensington Books.

== Career ==
A reader of vampire/horror novels, Karen first started writing Blood Secrets in January 1988. She conceived of writing the novel while living across the street from a cemetery, but reportedly never intended to create an ongoing series. She subsequently embarked on the creation of a series in response to the success of her first book. That series now includes seven titles. Los Angeles Times contributor Robert Masello described her as the Los Angeles area's "own Anne Rice."

== Bibliography ==
The Vampire Legacy Series

- Blood Red Dawn - 2004
- Resurrection - 2002
- The Vampire Vivienne - 2001
- Blood of my Blood - 2000
- Blood Ties - 1995
- Bitter Blood - 1994
- Blood Secrets - 1994

== See also ==
- List of horror fiction authors
