= We Will Drink a Fish Together =

1997 short story by Bill Johnson

"We Will Drink A Fish Together" is a 1997 science fiction story by Bill Johnson. It was first published in Asimov's Science Fiction, in May 1997.

== Synopsis ==
When Tony quits his job as part of the security detail for alien Ambassador Foremost so that he can attend a funeral in the small South Dakota town of Summit, Foremost follows him, in hopes that Tony can keep him safe.

== Reception ==
"We Will Drink A Fish Together" won the 1998 Hugo Award for Best Novelette, and was a finalist for the Nebula Award for Best Novelette of 1997.

At Infinity Plus, Keith Brooke stated that "apart from its wash of [19]90s detail, [the story] could easily have appeared at any time in the last 50 years", but commended Johnson for "strik[ing] a fine balance between an easy, laid-back, never-quite-folksy narrative voice and a taut suspenseful thriller".

== Origin ==
Johnson was inspired to write the story after leaving Chicago to attend a funeral in South Dakota, and "be[ing] struck by the difference in attitudes between very rural areas and cities"; ultimately, despite the presence of extraterrestrials in the story, "the true aliens are the different people, their cultures, and how they interact".

== Sequel ==
In 2018, Johnson published a sequel, "Bury Me in the Rainbow", depicting further events in Summit.
