= Bill Johnson (author) =

American novelist (1956–2022)

William Anthony Johnson (October 4, 1956 – March 17, 2022) was a science fiction writer from Webster, South Dakota. His writings often have a "regional" tone influenced by his South Dakota origins. This is particularly true of his story "We Will Drink a Fish Together", which in 1998 won the Hugo Award for Best Novelette. His 1999 collection is called Dakota Dreamin.

Johnson attended the University of Iowa where he was the editor of the school newspaper The Daily Iowan. He graduated in 1978 with a degree in journalism.

After spending some time employed as a writer he attended Duke University while continuing to work. He received his Master’s in Business Administration and went on to work in the technology industry. He spent several years at Motorola in business intelligence and them left to trade financial securities independently.

Johnson, who had Marfan syndrome, died on March 17, 2022.
