= Ian R. MacLeod =

British science fiction and fantasy writer (born 1956)

- Born: Ian Roderick MacLeod; 6 August 1956 (age 70); Solihull, England
- Occupation: Writer
- Writing career
- Genres: Science fiction; fantasy
- Notable awards: Sidewise Award for Alternate History (1998, 2005, 2011); World Fantasy Award—Novella (1999); Arthur C. Clarke Award (2009); John W. Campbell Memorial Award for Best Science Fiction Novel (2009)
- Website: ianrmacleod.com

Ian Roderick MacLeod (born 6 August 1956) is a British science fiction and fantasy writer.

He was born in Solihull near Birmingham. He studied law and worked as a civil servant before going freelance in early 1990s soon after he started publishing stories, attracting critical praise and awards.

== Writings ==
He is the author of seven novels, including The Light Ages and The House of Storms, which are set in an alternate universe nineteenth century England, where aether, a substance that can be controlled by the mind, has ossified English society into guilds and has retarded technological progress. His other novels and short stories feature a mixture of fantastic, historical, and futuristic elements, combined with a concern for character and vividly descriptive writing. His novel Song of Time, told from a viewpoint of a classical violinist and set in the near future, won the Arthur C. Clarke Award, the John W. Campbell Memorial Award for Best Science Fiction Novel and the Premio Italia Award for Best International SF Novel in 2023. His novel Wake Up and Dream, set in an alternative 1940s Los Angeles, won a Sidewise Award for Best Alternative History. His novel Red Snow follows the path of a vampire across several centuries in Europe and the United States.

MacLeod's novella "The Summer Isles" (Asimov's Science Fiction October/November 1998) won the Sidewise Award for Alternate History, Short Form and the World Fantasy Award for Best Novella. It is an alternate history where Britain, having been defeated in the World War I, develops its own form of fascism in 1930s. The narrator is a closeted homosexual Oxford historian who had known the leader in youth. It was written as a novel, which however could not sell; MacLeod published the cut version, with the full-length version only being published in a limited edition in 2005. This novel version also won the Sidewise Award for Alternate History, Long Form, thus becoming the only story to win the same award twice in two differing formats, novel and novella.

MacLeod won the World Fantasy Award again in for his 2000 novelette "The Chop Girl". His shorter fiction has been collected in Voyages by Starlight, Breathmoss and Other Exhalations, Past Magic, Journeys, Frost on Glass and Ragged Maps.

MacLeod was Guest of Honour at the 38th Novacon, held in November 2008.

== Bibliography ==
=== Novels ===
- The Great Wheel. Harcourt. 1997.
- The Light Ages (Earthlight imprint of Simon & Schuster, 2003) (2004 nomination for World Fantasy Award)
- The House of Storms (Simon & Schuster, 2005)
- The Summer Isles (Aio Publishing, 2005) (2005 Sidewise Award). An expanded version of the original 1998 novella, which also won the award.
- Song of Time (PS Publishing, 2008) (2009 Arthur C. Clarke Award, 2009 John W. Campbell Memorial Award)
- Wake Up and Dream (PS Publishing, 2011) (2011 Sidewise Award)
- Red Snow (2017, PS Publishing)

=== Short fiction ===
Collections

- Voyages by Starlight (1996, Arkham House)
- Breathmoss and Other Exhalations (2004, Golden Gryphon Press)
- Past Magic (2006, PS Publishing)
- Journeys (2010, Subterranean Press)
- Snodgrass and Other Illusions: The Best Short Stories of Ian R. MacLeod (Open Road Media, 2013) (title story adapted for television in 2013)
- Frost on Glass (2015, PS Publishing)
- Everywhere (JABberwocky, ebook collection volume 1. 2019)
- Nowhere (JABberwocky, ebook collection volume 2. 2019)
- Ragged Maps (2023, Subterranean Press)

Stories

Title	Year	First published	Reprinted/collected	Notes
The Discovered Country	2013	"The Discovered Country". Asimov's Science Fiction. 37 (9): 10–28. September 2013.		Novelette
Entangled	2013	"Entangled". Asimov's Science Fiction. 37 (12): 90–106. December 2013.		Novelette
The Réparateur of Strasbourg	2013	The Réparateur of Strasbourg. PS Publishing. 2013.		Chapbook
