= Pat Cadigan =

British-American science fiction author (born 1953)

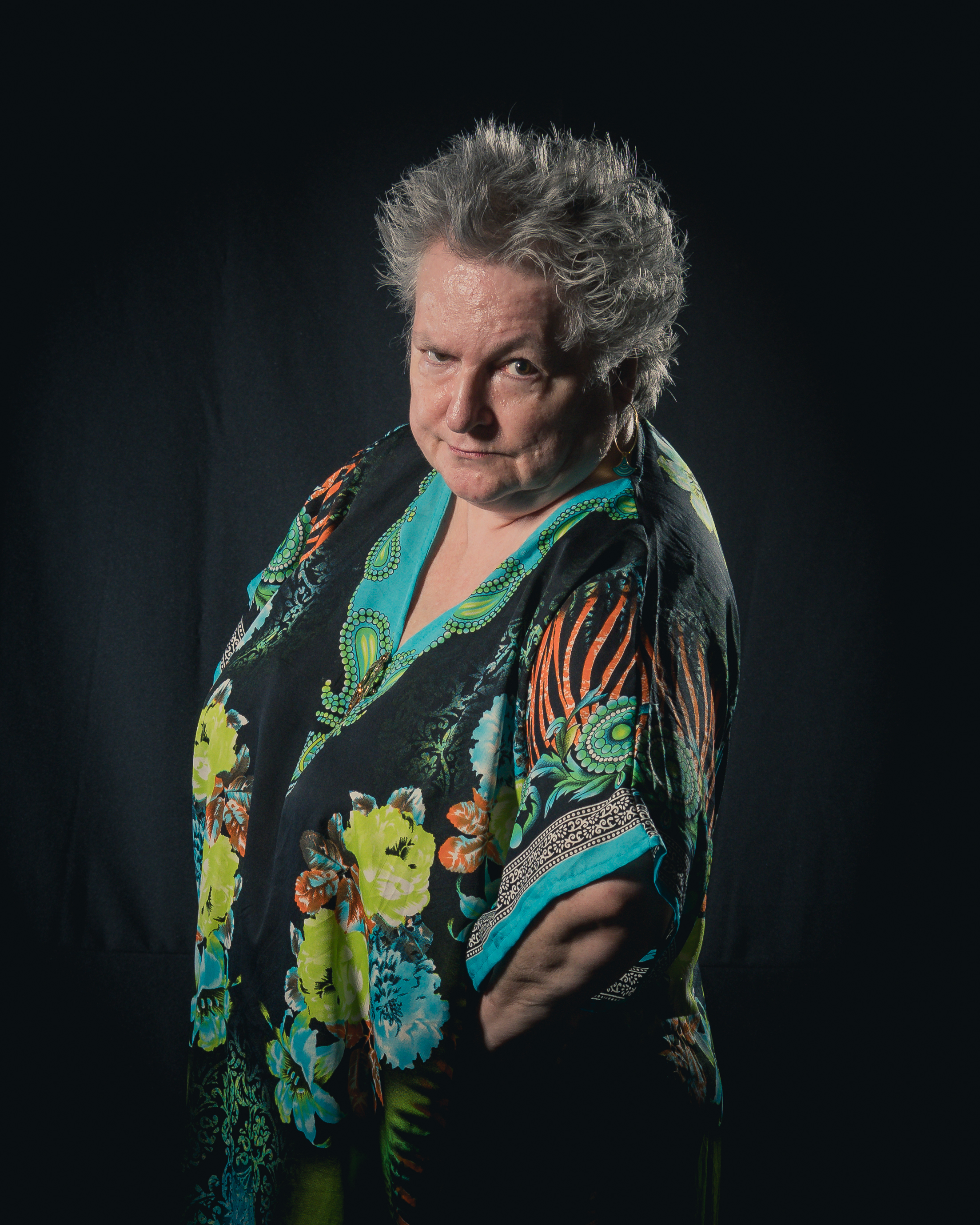
- Cadigan in 2017
- Born: September 10, 1953 (age 73); Schenectady, New York, U.S.
- Education: University of Massachusetts Amherst, University of Kansas
- Occupation: Writer
- Writing career
- Language: English
- Genres: Science fiction, cyberpunk
- Notable works: Synners, Fools
- Notable awards: Arthur C. Clarke Award; 1992 Synners; Arthur C. Clarke Award; 1995 Fools; Hugo Award for Best Novelette; 2013 The Girl-Thing who Went Out for Sushi

Patricia Oren Kearney Cadigan (born September 10, 1953) is a British-American science fiction author, whose work is most often identified with the cyberpunk movement. Her novels and short stories often explore the relationship between the human mind and technology. Her debut novel, Mindplayers, was nominated for the Philip K. Dick Award in 1988.

== Early years ==
Cadigan was born in Schenectady, New York, and grew up in Fitchburg, Massachusetts.

In the 1960s Cadigan and a childhood friend "invented a whole secret life in which we were twins from the planet Venus", she told National Public Radio. "The Beatles "came to us for advice about their songs and how to deal with fame and other important matters." She goes on to say: "On occasion, they would ask us to use our highly developed shape-shifting ability to become them, and finish recording sessions and concert tours when they were too tired to go on themselves." The Venusian twins had other superpowers, that they would sometimes use to help out Superman, Wonder Woman and other heroes, she said.

Cadigan was educated in theater at the University of Massachusetts Amherst and studied science fiction and science fiction writing at the University of Kansas (KU) under science fiction author and editor James Gunn.

Cadigan met her first husband, Rufus Cadigan, while in college; they divorced shortly after she graduated from KU in 1975. That same year, Cadigan joined the convention committee for MidAmeriCon, the 34th World Science Fiction Convention being held in Kansas City, Missouri, over the 1976 Labor Day weekend; she served on the committee as the convention's guest liaison to writer guest of honor Robert A. Heinlein, as well as helped to develop programming for the convention. At the same time, she also worked for fantasy writer Tom Reamy at his Nickelodeon Graphics Arts Service studio, where she daily typset various jobs. She also prepared the type galleys for MidAmeriCon's various publications, including the convention's hardcover program book. Following Reamy's death on 4 November 1977, Cadigan went to work as a writer for Kansas City, MO's Hallmark Cards company. In the late 1970s and early 1980s, she also edited the small press fantasy and science fiction magazines Chacal and later Shayol with her second husband, Arnie Fenner. Her and Fenner’s son, Robert, was born in 1985.

Cadigan emigrated to London in 1996, where she is married to her third husband, Christopher Fowler (not to be confused with the author of the same name). She became a UK citizen in late 2014.

== Writing career ==
Cadigan sold her first professional science fiction story in 1980. Her success as an author encouraged her to become a full-time writer in 1987.

Cadigan's first novel, Mindplayers, introduces what becomes the common theme to all her works: her stories blur the line between reality and perception by making the human mind a real, explorable place. Her second novel, Synners, expands upon the same theme; both feature a future where direct access to the mind via technology is possible. While her stories include many of the gritty, unvarnished characteristics of the cyberpunk genre, she further specializes in this exploration of the speculative relationship between technology and the perceptions of the human mind.

Cadigan has won a number of awards, including the 2013 Hugo Award for "The Girl-Thing Who Went Out for Sushi" in the Best Novelette category, and the Arthur C. Clarke Award in 1992 and 1995 for her novels Synners and Fools.

Robert A. Heinlein dedicated his 1982 novel Friday in part to Cadigan following her being the guest liaison to him at the 34th Worldcon in Kansas City.

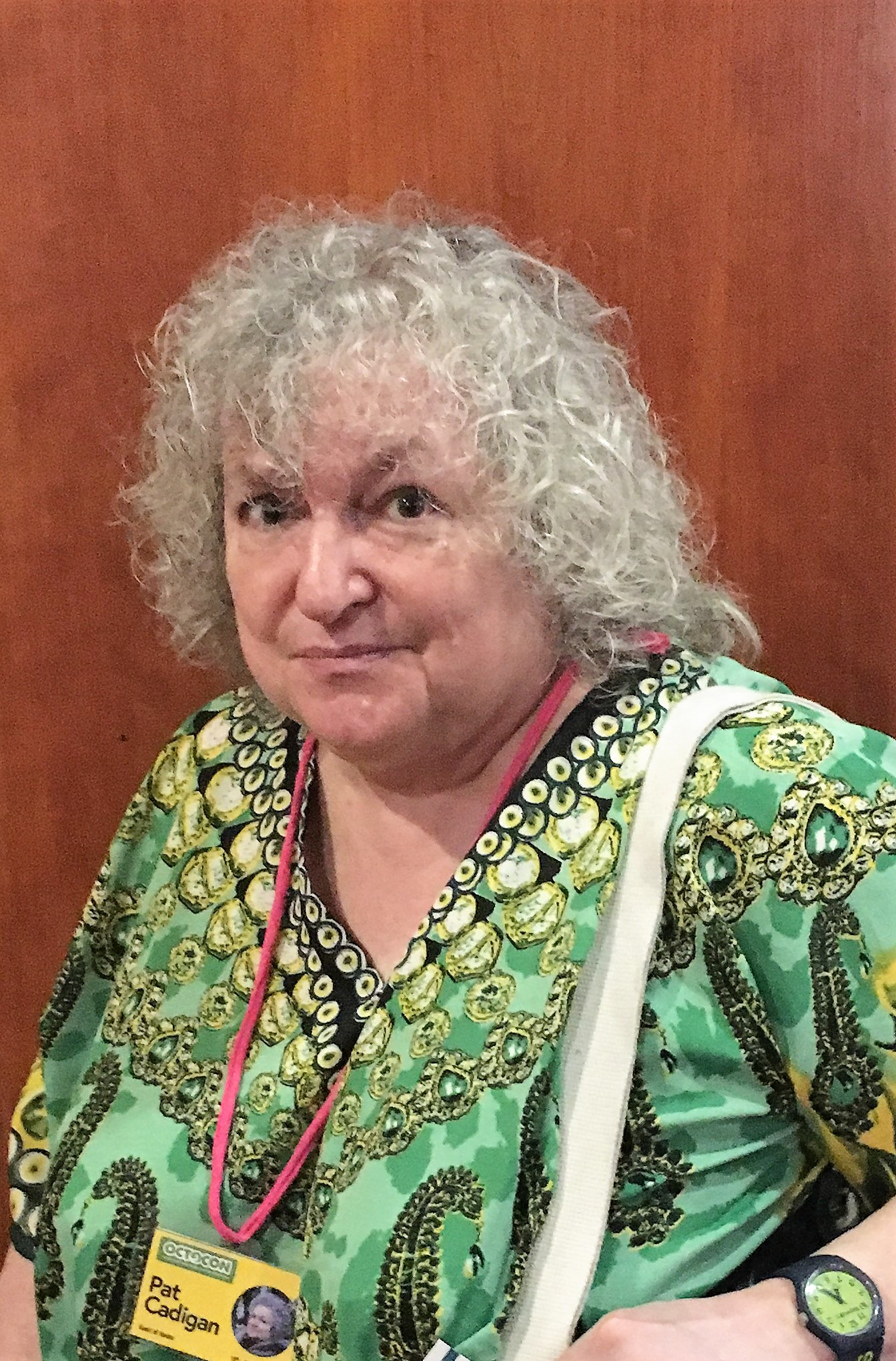
Pat Cadigan in 2018

== Health ==
In 2013, Cadigan announced that she had been diagnosed with cancer. She underwent surgery after an early diagnosis, suffered a relapse some years after, and recovered after extensive chemotherapy.

== Bibliography ==
From the Internet Speculative Fiction Database.

=== Series ===
==== Deadpan Allie ====
1. Mindplayers, (Bantam Spectra Aug. 1987)/(Gollancz Feb. 1988); revised and expanded from the following linked stories:
  - "The Pathosfinder", (nv) The Berkley Showcase: New Writings in Science Fiction & Fantasy, ed. John Silbersack & Victoria Schochet, Berkley July 1981
  - "Nearly Departed", (ss) Asimov's June 1983; read online
  - "Variation on a Man", (ss) Omni Jan. 1984
  - "Lunatic Bridge", (nv) The Fifth Omni Book of Science Fiction, ed. Ellen Datlow, Zebra Books April 1987
2. "Dirty Work", (nv) Blood Is Not Enough, ed. Ellen Datlow, Morrow 1989
3. "A Lie for a Lie", (nv) Lethal Kisses, ed. Ellen Datlow, Millennium Dec. 1996 {aka Wild Justice}

==== Dore Konstantin (TechnoCrime, Artificial Reality Division) ====
1. Tea from an Empty Cup, (Tor Oct. 1998); loosely based on the following linked novellas:
  - "Death in the Promised Land", (na) Omni Online March 1995 / Asimov’s Nov. 1995
  - "Tea from an Empty Cup", (na) Omni Online Oct. 1995 / Black Mist and Other Japanese Futures, ed. Orson Scott Card & Keith Ferrell, DAW Dec. 1997
2. Dervish is Digital, (Macmillan UK Oct. 2000) / (Tor July 2001)

==== Short fiction ====
===== Collections =====
====== Patterns (1989) ======
- Introduction, Bruce Sterling
- "Patterns", (ss) Omni Aug. 1987
- "Eenie, Meenie, Ipsateenie", (ss) Shadows 6, ed. Charles L. Grant, Doubleday 1983
- "Vengeance Is Yours", (ss) Omni May 1983
- "The Day the Martels Got the Cable", (ss) F&SF Dec. 1982
- "Roadside Rescue", (ss) Omni July 1985
- "Rock On", (ss) Light Years and Dark, ed. Michael Bishop, Berkley 1984
- "Heal", (vi) Omni April 1988
- "Another One Hits the Road", (nv) F&SF Jan. 1984
- "My Brother's Keeper", (nv) Asimov's Jan. 1988
- "Pretty Boy Crossover", (ss) Asimov's Jan. 1986
- "Two", (nv) F&SF Jan. 1988
- "Angel", (ss) Asimov's May 1987; read online
- "It Was the Heat", (ss) Tropical Chills, ed. Tim Sullivan, Avon 1988
- "The Power and the Passion", (ss)

====== Home by the Sea (1992) ======
- Introduction, Mike Resnick
- "Dirty Work", (nv) Blood Is Not Enough, ed. Ellen Datlow, Morrow 1989
- "50 Ways to Improve Your Orgasm", (ss) Asimov's April 1992
- "Dispatches from the Revolution", (nv) Asimov's July 1991; read online (Alternate Presidents ed. Mike Resnick)
- "Home by the Sea", (nv) A Whisper of Blood, ed. Ellen Datlow, Morrow 1991; Read online
- A Cadigan Bibliography, (bi)

====== Dirty Work (1993) ======
- Introduction, Storm Constantine (in)
- "Dirty Work", (nv) Blood Is Not Enough, ed. Ellen Datlow, Morrow 1989
- "Second Comings—Reasonable Rates", (ss) F&SF Feb. 1981
- "The Sorceress in Spite of Herself", (ss) Asimov's Dec. 1982
- "50 Ways to Improve Your Orgasm", (ss) Asimov's April 1992
- "Mother's Milt", (ss) OMNI Best Science Fiction Two, ed. Ellen Datlow, OMNI Books 1992
- "True Faces", (nv) F&SF April 1992
- "New Life for Old", (ss) Aladdin: Master of the Lamp, ed. Mike Resnick & Martin H. Greenberg, DAW 1992
- "The Coming of the Doll", (ss) F&SF June 1981
- "The Pond", (ss) Fears, ed. Charles L. Grant, Berkley 1983
- "The Boys in the Rain", (ss) Twilight Zone June 1987
- "In the Dark", (ss) When the Music's Over, ed. Lewis Shiner, Bantam Spectra 1991
- "Johnny Come Home", (ss) Omni June 1991
- "Naming Names", (nv) Narrow Houses, ed. Peter Crowther, Little Brown UK 1992
- "A Deal with God", (nv) Grails: Quests, Visitations and Other Occurrences, ed. Richard Gilliam, Martin H. Greenberg & Edward E. Kramer, Unnameable Press 1992
- "Dispatches from the Revolution", (nv) Asimov's July 1991; read online
- "No Prisoners", (nv) Alternate Kennedys, ed. Mike Resnick, Tor 1992
- "Home by the Sea", (nv) A Whisper of Blood, ed. Ellen Datlow, Morrow 1991; Read online
- "Lost Girls", (ss)

===== Chapbooks =====
- My Brother's Keeper, (Pulphouse July 1992); novelette, reprinted from Asimov's Jan. 1988
- Chalk, (This is Horror Nov. 2013); novelette
- The Web: Avatar, (Dolphin April 1999); novella

=== Stand-alone novels ===
- Synners. Bantam Books. 1991. ISBN 0553282549. Winner of the 1992 Arthur C. Clarke award
- Fools. Bantam Books. 1992. ISBN 9780553295122. Winner of the 1995 Arthur C. Clarke award

==== Tie-ins ====
- Lost in Space: Promised Land (HarperEntertainment April 1999/Thorndike Press July 1999; sequel to the film Lost in Space)
- Upgrade & Sensuous Cindy (Black Flame April 2004; novelization of episodes from The Twilight Zone)
- Cellular (Black Flame Aug. 2004; novelization of Cellular)
- Jason X (Black Flame Feb. 2005; novelization of Jason X)
- Jason X: The Experiment (Black Flame February 2005; sequel to Jason X)
- Gemini Man (Titan Books, 2018; novelization of the film Gemini Man, credited as "Titan Books")
- Alita: Battle Angel - Iron City (Titan Books, November 2018; prequel to the film Alita: Battle Angel)
- Harley Quinn: Mad Love with Paul Dini, (Titan Books, November 2018, novelization the one-shot comic book)
- Alita: Battle Angel — The Official Movie Novelization (Titan Books, February 2019; novelization of the film Alita: Battle Angel, Winner of the Scribe Award for Best Adapted Novel.)
- Alien 3: The Unproduced Screenplay (Titan Books, August 2021; novelization of the unproduced screenplay by William Gibson, Scribe Award winner)
- Ultraman: The Official Novelization (Titan Books, March 2023; novelization of the series Ultraman,Scribe Award Winner)
- Ultraman: UltraSeven (Titan Books, July 2025; novelization of the series Ultraseven)

=== Tie-in nonfiction ===
- The Making of Lost in Space (HarperPrism, May 1998; tie-in with Lost in Space film)
- Resurrecting the Mummy: The Making of the Movie (Ebury Press June 1999; tie-in with 1999 The Mummy film)
