= James Patrick Kelly =

American science fiction author (born 1951)

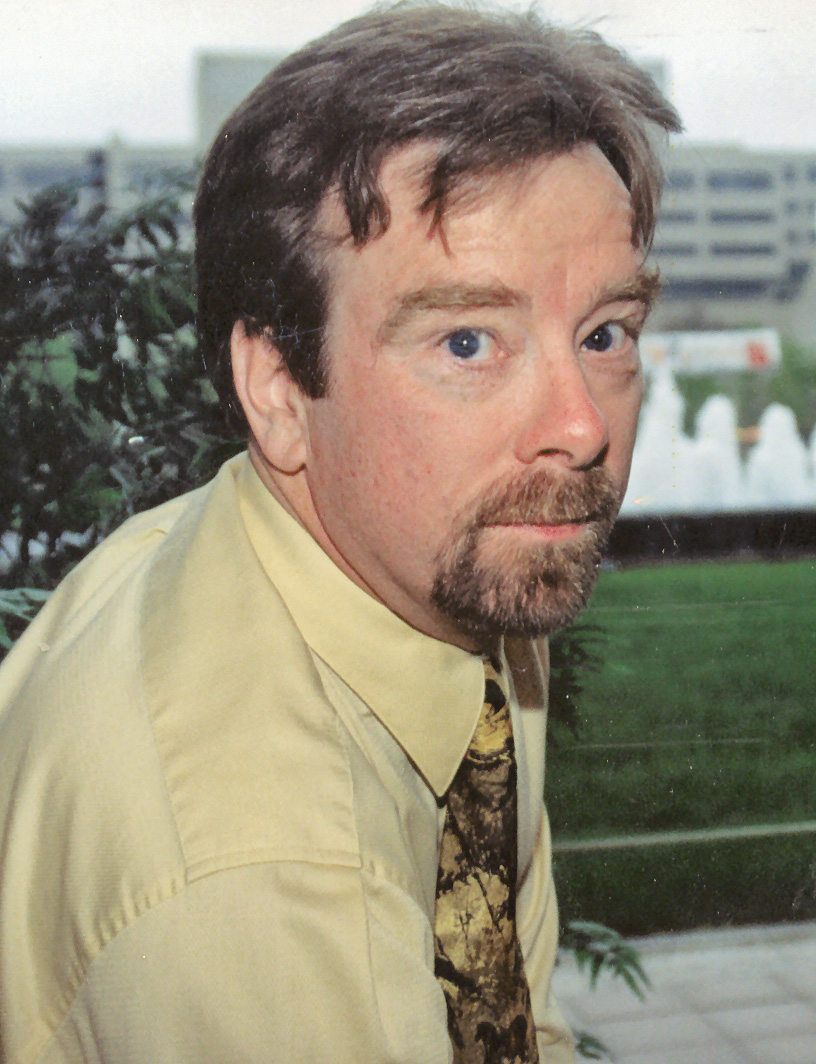
- Born: April 11, 1951 (age 75); Mineola, New York
- Occupations: Writer, editor
- Writing career
- Period: 1975–present
- Genres: Science fiction, Fantasy
- Notable works: Think Like a Dinosaur (1995); 10^16 to 1 (1999); Burn (2005)
- Website: www.jimkelly.net

James Patrick Kelly (born April 11, 1951) is an American science fiction author who has won both the Hugo Award and the Nebula Award.

== Biography ==
Kelly made his first fiction sale in 1975. He graduated magna cum laude from the University of Notre Dame in 1972, with a B.A. in English Literature. After graduating from college, he worked as a full-time proposal writer until 1977. He attended the Clarion Workshop twice, once in 1974 and again in 1976.

Throughout the 1980s, he and his friend John Kessel became involved in the humanist/cyberpunk debate. While Kessel and Kelly were both humanists, Kelly also wrote several cyberpunk-like stories, such as "The Prisoner of Chillon" (1985) and "Rat" (1986). His story "Solstice" (1985) was published in Bruce Sterling's anthology Mirrorshades: The Cyberpunk Anthology.

Kelly has been awarded several of science fiction's highest honors. He won the Hugo Award for his novelette Think Like a Dinosaur (1995) and again for his novelette 10^{16} to 1 (1999). Most recently, his 2005 novella, Burn, won the 2006 Nebula Award. Other stories have won the Asimov's Reader Poll and the SF Chronicle Award. He is frequently on the final ballot for the Nebula Award, the Locus Poll Award and the Theodore Sturgeon Memorial Award.

As of 2020 he is retired from the faculty for the Stonecoast MFA Program in Creative Writing at the University of Southern Maine. He frequently teaches and participates in science fiction workshops, such as Clarion and the Sycamore Hill Writer's Workshop. He has served on the New Hampshire State Council on the Arts since 1998 and chaired the council in 2004.

He is a frequent contributor to Asimov's Science Fiction and for the past several years has contributed a non-fiction column to Asimov's, "On the Net." He has had a story in the June issue of Asimov's for the past twenty years. In addition to his writing, Kelly has recently turned his hand to editing (with John Kessel), with several reprint anthologies: Feeling Very Strange: The Slipstream Anthology, Rewired: The Post-Cyberpunk Anthology and The Secret History of Science Fiction. Through these anthologies, Kelly and Kessel have brought together a wide spectrum of both traditional genre authors and authors who are considered to be more mainstream, including Don DeLillo, George Saunders, Jonathan Lethem, Aimee Bender, Michael Chabon and Steven Millhauser.

== Bibliography ==
=== Novels ===
- Kelly, James Patrick & John Kessel (1985). Freedom Beach. New York: Bluejay Books.
- Kelly, James Patrick (1994). Wildlife. New York: Tor Books.
- — (2005). Burn. Tachyon Publications. (Note: Nebula Award winner.)

Mariska Volochkova series

- Going Deep (2009)
- Plus or Minus (2010)
- Tourists (2011)
- Mother Go (Audible Studios, 2017)

Messengers Chronicles

- Kelly, James P. (1984). Planet of Whispers. New York: Bluejay Books.
- Kelly, James Patrick (1989). Look into the sun. New York: T. Doherty Associates/TOR.

=== Short fiction ===
Collections

- Heroines (1990)
- Think Like a Dinosaur and Other Stories (Golden Gryphon Press, 1997)
- Strange But Not a Stranger (Golden Gryphon Press, 2002)
- The Wreck of the Godspeed and Other Stories (Golden Gryphon Press, 2008)
- Ninety Percent of Everything (2011) (with John Kessel and Jonathan Lethem)
- Masters of Science Fiction: James Patrick Kelly (2016)
- The Promise of Space and Other Stories (2018)
- The First Law of Thermodynamics (2021)

Anthologies (edited)

- Feeling Very Strange: The Slipstream Anthology (Tachyon Publications, 2006) (co-edited with John Kessel)
- Rewired: The Post-Cyberpunk Anthology (Tachyon Publications, 2007) (co-edited with John Kessel)
- The Secret History of Science Fiction (Tachyon Publications, 2009) (co-edited with John Kessel)
- Kafkaesque: Stories Inspired by Franz Kafka (Tachyon Publications, 2011) (co-edited with John Kessel)
- Digital Rapture: The Singularity Anthology (Tachyon Publications, 2012) (co-edited with John Kessel)
- Nebula Awards Showcase 2012 (Pyr, 2012) (co-edited with John Kessel)

Stories

Title	Year	First published	Reprinted/collected	Notes
Dea ex machina	1975	"Dea ex machina". Galaxy Science Fiction. April 1975.		
The prisoner of Chillon	1986	"The prisoner of Chillon". Asimov's Science Fiction. June 1986.		
Rat	1986	"Rat". F&SF. June 1986.		
Glass cloud	1987	"Glass cloud". Asimov's Science Fiction. June 1987.		
Mr. Boy	1990	"Mr. Boy". Asimov's Science Fiction. June 1990.		Novella
Choosing sides	2006	Choosing sides (e-Book). Fictionwise. 2006.	Kelly, James Patrick (2007). "Choosing sides". In Resnick, Mike (ed.). The omega egg (e-Book). Fictionwise.	Chapter 11 of a 'round-robin' novel. See ISFDB entry for details.
Declaration	2014	"Declaration". Asimov's Science Fiction. 38 (3): 89–106. March 2014.		
Someday	2014	"Someday". Asimov's Science Fiction. 38 (4&5): 134–141. April–May 2014.		
Uncanny	2014	"Uncanny". Asimov's Science Fiction. 38 (10–11): 98–100. October–November 2014.		

- "The Propagation of Light in a Vacuum" (Universe 1, 1990)
- "Pogrom" (Asimov's, Jan 1991)
- "Think Like a Dinosaur" (Asimov's, June 1995) (Hugo Award winner)
- "10^16 to 1" (Asimov's, June 1999) (Hugo Award winner)
- "Ninety Percent of Everything" (with Jonathan Lethem and John Kessel) (F&SF, Sep 1999)
- "Undone" (Asimov's, June 2001)
- "The Pyramid of Amirah" (F&SF, March 2002)
- "Barry Westphall Crashes the Singularity" (infinitematrix.net, 2002)
- "Bernardo's House" (Asimov's, June 2003)
- "Men Are Trouble" (Asimov's, June 2004)
- "The Best Christmas Ever" (scifi.com, 2004) (Hugo Award nominee) Audio recordings are available by Walter O'Hara and Jim Kelly.
- "The Edge of Nowhere" (Asimov's, June 2005)
- "Why School Buses Are Yellow" (infinitematrix.net, 2005)
- "The Leila Torn Show" (Asimov's, June 2006)
- "Surprise Party" (Asimov's, June 2008)
- "The Promise of Space" (Clarkesworld Magazine, September 2013)

=== On the Net : columns from Asimov's Science Fiction ===
- "What is reality?". Asimov's Science Fiction. 36 (8): 10–13. August 2012.
- "Unreal life". Asimov's Science Fiction. 36 (10&11): 10–13. October–November 2012.
- "Mobility". Asimov's Science Fiction. 37 (2): 9–11. February 2013.
- "A field guide to the editors". Asimov's Science Fiction. 37 (4&5): 10–13. April–May 2013.
- "SF Economics 101". Asimov's Science Fiction. 37 (6): 10–12. June 2013.
- "What counts?". Asimov's Science Fiction. 37 (8): 9–11. August 2013.
- "Both sides of the desk". Asimov's Science Fiction. 37 (10–11): 12–14. October–November 2013.
- "More editing and writing". Asimov's Science Fiction. 38 (1): 12–14. January 2014.
- "Good (and bad) news from outer space". Asimov's Science Fiction. 38 (3): 10–12. March 2014.
- "It's an honor just to be nominated". Asimov's Science Fiction. 38 (6): 10–12. June 2014.
- "It's educational". Asimov's Science Fiction. 38 (8): 10–13. August 2014.
- "Stationed". Asimov's Science Fiction. 38 (10–11): 12–15. October–November 2014.
- "Billions and billions". Asimov's Science Fiction. 39 (1): 10–13. January 2015.
- "Curation, please!". Asimov's Science Fiction. 39 (3): 10–12. March 2015.
- "The optimist's tale". Asimov's Science Fiction. 39 (6): 10–13. June 2015.

=== Interviews ===
- An Interview with James Patrick Kelly and John Kessel conducted by John Joseph Adams
- James Patrick Kelly - Audio Interview
- SciFi.com Interview
- AISFP 55 - James Patrick Kelly Interviewed by Matthew Wayne Selznick - Audio Interview
- A Rain Taxi Interview with James Patrick Kelly and John Kessel conducted by Matthew Cheney

———————
