= Spew =

Spew or SPEW may refer to:

- Socialist Party (England and Wales)
- Society for Promoting the Employment of Women, one of the earliest British women's organisations
- Society for the Promotion of Elfish Welfare, a fictional organization formed by Hermione Granger in 2000's Harry Potter and the Goblet of Fire
- "Spew", a short story by Neal Stephenson that was published in the 1996 anthology Hackers
- Spew, slang term for vomiting
