= Nebula Awards 30 =

1996 anthology edited by Pamela Sargent

- Cover of first edition
- Editor: Pamela Sargent
- Cover artist: Steven Cooley
- Language: English
- Series: Nebula Awards
- Genre: Science fiction
- Publisher: Harcourt Brace
- Publication date: 1996
- Publication place: United States
- Media type: Print (hardcover)
- Pages: xv, 350
- ISBN: 0-15-100113-8
- OCLC: 34529041
- Dewey Decimal: 813.087608
- LC Class: PS648.S3 N43
- Preceded by: Nebula Awards 29
- Followed by: Nebula Awards 31

Nebula Awards 30 is an anthology of science fiction short works edited by Pamela Sargent, the second of three successive volumes under her editorship. It was first published in hardcover and trade paperback by Harcourt Brace in April 1996.

== Summary ==
The book collects pieces that won or were nominated for the Nebula Awards for novel, novella, novelette and short story for the year 1995, a representative early story by 1995 Grand Master award winner Damon Knight, and various nonfiction pieces related to the awards, together with the Rhysling Award-winning poems for 1994 and an introduction by the editor. Not all nominees for the various awards are included.

== Contents ==
- "Introduction" (Pamela Sargent)
- "The Year in Science Fiction and Fantasy: A Symposium" [essay] (Paul Di Filippo, James Gunn, Pat Murphy, Sheila Finch, Jack Dann, Nicola Griffith, and John Kessel)
- "Seven Views of Olduvai Gorge" [Best Novella winner, 1995] (Mike Resnick)
- "Inspiration" [Best Short Story nominee, 1995] (Ben Bova)
- "Virtual Love" [Best Short Story nominee, 1995] (Maureen F. McHugh)
- "None So Blind" [Best Short Story nominee, 1995] (Joe Haldeman)
- "Fortyday" [short story] (Damon Knight)
- "In Memorium: Robert Bloch" [essay] (Frank M. Robinson)
- "The Martian Child" [Best Novelette winner, 1995] (David Gerrold)
- "Basement Flats: Redefining the Burgess Shale" [Rhysling Award - Long Poem winner, 1994] (Robert Frazier and W. Gregory Stewart)
- "Flight Is for Those Who Have Not Yet Crossed Over" [Rhysling Award - Short Poem winner (tied), 1994] (Jeff VanderMeer)
- "Spacer's Compass" [Rhysling Award - Short Poem winner (tied), 1994] (Bruce Boston)
- "Understanding Entropy" [Best Short Story nominee, 1995] (Barry N. Malzberg)
- "I Know What You're Thinking" [Best Short Story nominee, 1995] (Kate Wilhelm)
- "A Defense of the Social Contracts" [Best Short Story winner, 1995] (Martha Soukup)
- "From a Park Bench to the Great Beyond: The Science Fiction and Fantasy Films of 1994" [essay] (Kathi Maio)
- "The Matter of Seggri" [Best Novelette nominee, 1995] (Ursula K. Le Guin)
- Moving Mars [Best Novel winner, 1995 (excerpt)] (Greg Bear)

== Reception ==
Kirkus Reviews called the anthology "[e]xcellent in all departments." The Resnick, Gerrold and Soukup pieces were singled out for brief comment, and the contributions to the "symposium" succinctly characterized.

The collection was also reviewed by Gary K. Wolfe (1996) in Locus no. 422, March 1996, and Don D'Ammassa (1996) in Science Fiction Chronicle no. 190, October 1996.

== Awards ==
The anthology placed sixth in the 1997 Locus Poll Award for Best Anthology.
