= Nebula Awards 31 =

1997 anthology edited by Pamela Sargent

- Cover of first edition
- Editor: Pamela Sargent
- Cover artist: Steven Cooley
- Language: English
- Series: Nebula Awards
- Genre: Science fiction
- Publisher: Harcourt Brace
- Publication date: 1997
- Publication place: United States
- Media type: Print (hardcover)
- Pages: xiv, 334
- ISBN: 0-15-100108-1
- OCLC: 36774364
- Dewey Decimal: 813/.087608
- LC Class: PS648.S3 N38 1997
- Preceded by: Nebula Awards 30
- Followed by: Nebula Awards 32

Nebula Awards 31 is an anthology of science fiction short works edited by Pamela Sargent, the third of three successive volumes under her editorship. It was first published in hardcover and trade paperback by Harcourt Brace in April 1997, and reprinted in trade paperback in July 1999.

== Summary ==
The book collects pieces that won or were nominated for the Nebula Awards for novella, novelette and short story for the year 1996, a profile of 1996 Grand Master award winner A. E. van Vogt with a representative early story by him, and various other nonfiction pieces related to the awards, together with the Rhysling Award-winning poems for 1995 and an introduction by the editor. Not all nominees for the various awards are included.

== Contents ==
- "Introduction" [essay] (Pamela Sargent)
- "Rumaging Through the Giant Purse" [essay] (Paul Di Filippo)
- "Touchstones for Gender-Benders" [essay] (Nancy Springer)
- "Planet Deseret" [essay] (Judith Moffett)
- "The British Scene" [essay] (Ian Watson)
- "Gresham's Law and Science Fiction" [essay] (Robert Silverberg)
- "Family Values" [essay] (Michaela Roessner)
- "Solitude" [Best Novelette winner, 1996] (Ursula K. Le Guin)
- "Death and the Librarian" [Best Short Story winner, 1996] (Esther M. Friesner)
- "Alien Jane" [Best Short Story nominee, 1996] (Kelley Eskridge)
- "Think Like a Dinosaur" [Best Novelette winner, 1996] (James Patrick Kelly)
- "In Memoriam: John Brunner and Roger Zelazny" [essay] (Ian Watson, Jack Dann and Jack C. Haldeman, II)
- "The Lincoln Train" [Best Short Story nominee, 1996] (Maureen F. McHugh)
- "The Resurrection Man's Legacy" [Best Novelette nominee, 1996] (Dale Bailey)
- "Pilot, Pilot" [Rhysling Award - Best Long Poem winner, 1995] (David Lunde)
- "Skin of Glass" [Rhysling Award - Best Short Poem winner, 1995] (Dan Raphael)
- "You See But You Do Not Observe" [short story] (Robert J. Sawyer)
- "Old Legends" [essay] (Gregory Benford)
- "A. E. van Vogt: Prefatory Remarks" [essay] (Harlan Ellison)
- "A. E. van Vogt: An Appreciation" [essay] (Charles L. Harness)
- "Enchanted Village" [short story] (A. E. van Vogt)
- "It'll Float, but Can It Fly? Science Fiction and Fantasy Films of 1995" [essay] (Kathi Maio)
- "The Narcissus Plague" [Best Short Story nominee, 1996] (Lisa Goldstein)
- "Last Summer at Mars Hill" [Best Novella winner, 1996] (Elizabeth Hand)

== Reception ==
Kirkus Reviews called the anthology "another excellent compendium," with "[f]ine fiction along with valuable insights." The van Vogt piece (also "excellent") and Benford essay ("splendid") were singled out for brief comment.

The collection was also reviewed by Gary K. Wolfe in Locus no. 436, May 1997, Michael M. Levy in The New York Review of Science Fiction, November 1997, and Diana Jackson in Pirate Writings no. 16, 1998.

== Awards ==
The anthology placed ninth in the 1998 Locus Poll Award for Best Anthology.
