= Jack Dann and Gardner Dozois Ace anthology series =

Jack Dann and Gardner Dozois have jointly edited a series of themed science fiction and fantasy anthologies, mostly published by Ace Books (a few were issued by other publishers). Because most of the earlier volumes had one-word titles followed by an exclamation mark, it has also been known as "The Exclamatory series."

The series began in 1980 with Aliens!, issued by Pocket Books. Ace took over publication with Unicorns!, the second volume, in 1982. Under Ace, most volumes of the series were originally themed around a certain type of "magic" entities, with science fiction-oriented volumes being the exception. Hence, it was known as the "Magic Tales Anthology Series" until 1995. The "magic" guideline was abandoned in 1996 when the series switched its focus to more strictly science fiction themes, beginning with Hackers. Volumes have usually appeared at the rate of one or two per year, with 38 volumes as of 2007.

The stories selected for the books tend to be reprints of previously published stories, some of them decades old. Each book has a preface by the editors, along with a short introduction for each of the stories, focused on other works by the story's author.

Jack Dann and Gardner Dozois have also co-edited anthologies that are not part of this series, such as Future Power (1976).

== Volumes of the Jack Dann and Gardner Dozois Ace anthology series ==
- Aliens! (April 1980, Pocket Books, ISBN 0-671-83155-0)
- Unicorns! (May 1982, ISBN 0-441-85441-9)
- Magicats! (June 1984, ISBN 978-0-441-51532-5)
- Bestiary! (October 1985, ISBN 978-0-441-05508-1)
- Mermaids! (January 1986, ISBN 978-0-441-52567-6)
- Sorcerers! (October 1986, ISBN 978-0-441-77532-3)
- Demons! (July 1987, ISBN 978-0-441-14264-4)
- Dogtales! (September 1988, ISBN 978-0-441-15760-0)
- Seaserpents! (December 1989, ISBN 978-0-441-75682-7)
- Dinosaurs! (June 1990, ISBN 978-0-441-14883-7)
- Little People! (March 1991, ISBN 978-0-441-50391-9)
- Magicats II (December 1991, ISBN 978-0-441-51533-2)
- Unicorns II (November 1992, ISBN 978-0-441-84564-4)
- Dragons! (August 1993, ISBN 978-0-441-16631-2)
- Invaders! (December 1993, ISBN 978-0-441-01519-1)
- Horses! (May 1994, ISBN 978-0-441-00057-9)
- Angels! (June 1995, ISBN 978-0-441-00220-7)
- Dinosaurs II (December 1995, ISBN 978-0-441-00285-6)
- Hackers (October 1996, ISBN 978-0-441-00375-4)
- Timegates (March 1997, ISBN 978-0-441-00428-7)
- Clones (April 1998, ISBN 978-0-441-00522-2)
- Immortals (July 1998, ISBN 978-0-441-00539-0)
- Nanotech (December 1998, ISBN 978-0-441-00585-7)
- Future War (August 1999, ISBN 978-0-441-00639-7)
- Armageddons (November 1999, ISBN 978-0-441-00675-5)
- Aliens Among Us (June 2000, ISBN 978-0-441-00704-2)
- Genometry (January 2001, ISBN 978-0-441-00797-4)
- Space Soldiers (April 2001, ISBN 978-0-441-00824-7)
- Future Sports (June 2002, ISBN 978-0-441-00961-9)
- Beyond Flesh (December 2002, ISBN 978-0-441-00999-2)
- Future Crimes (December 2003, ISBN 978-0-441-01118-6)
- A.I.s (December 2004, ISBN 978-0-441-01216-9)
- Robots (August 2005, ISBN 978-0-441-01321-0)
- Beyond Singularity (December 2005, ISBN 978-0-441-01363-0)
- Escape from Earth (August 2006, SFBC, ISBN 978-1-58288-225-3)
- Futures Past (November 2006, ISBN 978-0-441-01454-5)
- Dangerous Games (April 2007, ISBN 978-0-441-01490-3)
- Wizards (May 2007, Berkley Books, ISBN 978-1-101-20874-8)

== See also ==
- Category:Jack Dann and Gardner Dozois Ace anthologies
