= Timegates =

1997 anthology edited by Jack Dann and Gardner Dozois

- Cover of 1997 edition (paperback)
- Editors: Jack Dann and Gardner Dozois
- Cover artist: Jean-Francois Podevin
- Language: English
- Series: Jack Dann and Gardner Dozois Ace anthology series
- Genre: Science fiction
- Publisher: Ace Books
- Publication date: 1997
- Publication place: United States
- Media type: Print (Paperback)
- Pages: 244
- ISBN: 0-441-00428-8
- OCLC: 36381503
- Preceded by: Hackers
- Followed by: Clones

Timegates is a 1997 anthology of short stories edited by American writers Jack Dann and Gardner Dozois.

== Contents ==
- Air Raid by John Varley
- The Man Who Walked Home by James Tiptree, Jr.
- Another Story by Ursula K. Le Guin
- Full Chicken Richness by Avram Davidson
- The Price of Oranges by Nancy Kress
- The Secret Place by Richard McKenna
- Anniversary Project by Joe Haldeman
- Time's Arrow by Jack McDevitt
- Hole-in-the-Wall by Bridget McKenna
- Anachron by Damon Knight
- Trapalanda by Charles Sheffield
- The Hole on the Corner by R. A. Lafferty
