= Aliens! =

Anthology of science fiction short stories

- Cover of first edition
- Editors: Gardner Dozois and Jack Dann
- Illustrator: Jack Gaughan
- Cover artist: Michael Whelan
- Language: English
- Series: Jack Dann and Gardner Dozois anthology series
- Genre: Science fiction
- Publisher: Pocket Books
- Publication date: 1980
- Publication place: United States
- Media type: Print (paperback)
- Pages: xi, 305
- ISBN: 0-671-83155-0
- Followed by: Unicorns!

Aliens! is a themed anthology of science fiction short works edited by American writers Gardner Dozois and Jack Dann. It is the first in a series of themed anthologies. It was first published in paperback by Pocket Books in April 1980. Subsequent volumes in the series were published by Ace Books.

== Summary ==
The book collects fourteen novellas, novelettes and short stories by various science fiction authors, including four Draco Tavern stories by Larry Niven. It includes a general foreword and individual introductions to each piece by the editors, together with a bibliography of further reading.

== Contents ==
- "Foreword" (Gardner Dozois and Jack Dann)
- "Assimilating Our Culture, That's What They're Doing" (Larry Niven)
- "Grammar Lesson" (Larry Niven)
- "The Subject Is Closed" (Larry Niven)
- "Cruel and Unusual" (Larry Niven)
- "We Purchased People" (Frederik Pohl)
- "Guesting Time" (R. A. Lafferty)
- "And I Awoke and Found Me Here on the Cold Hill's Side" (James Tiptree, Jr.)
- "Angel's Egg" (Edgar Pangborn)
- "Oh, to Be a Blobel!" (Philip K. Dick)
- "Be Merry" (Algis Budrys)
- "Pattern" (Fredric Brown)
- "An Honorable Death" (Gordon R. Dickson)
- "The Reality Trip" (Robert Silverberg)
- "Rule Golden" (Damon Knight)
- "Alien-Human Relations - A Guide to Further Reading"
