= Strangers (Dozois novel) =

1978 novel by Gardner Dozois

- First edition (h/b)
- Author: Gardner Dozois
- Language: English
- Genre: Science fiction novel
- Publisher: Berkley Books
- Publication date: 1978
- Publication place: United States
- Media type: Print (hardback & paperback)
- ISBN: 0-399-12095-5
- OCLC: 3168675
- Dewey Decimal: 813/.5/4
- LC Class: PZ4.D7554 St PS3554.O98

Strangers is a science fiction novel by American author Gardner Dozois, published in 1978.

The novel was expanded from its original form as a novella, which first appeared in New Dimensions IV (edited by Robert Silverberg) in 1974. The novella was nominated for both the Hugo and Locus Poll Award, and has since been collected in Dozois's short fiction collection, Strange Days: Fabulous Journeys with Gardner Dozois.

The expanded novel was originally published by Berkley Books, and was nominated for the Nebula Award for Best Novel and the Locus Poll Award. It was reprinted by iBooks in 2003.
