= Immortals (anthology) =

1998 anthology edited by Jack Dann and Gardner Dozois

- Cover of 1998 edition (paperback)
- Editors: Jack Dann and Gardner Dozois
- Cover artist: Jean-Francois Podevin
- Language: English
- Series: Jack Dann and Gardner Dozois Ace anthology series
- Genre: Science fiction
- Publisher: Ace Books
- Publication date: 1998
- Publication place: United States
- Media type: Print (Paperback)
- Pages: 258
- ISBN: 0-441-00539-X
- OCLC: 39349550
- Preceded by: Clones
- Followed by: Nanotech

Immortals is a 1998 anthology of science fiction short stories edited by American writers Jack Dann and Gardner Dozois.

== Contents ==
- Learning to Be Me by Greg Egan
- Grotto of the Dancing Deer by Clifford D. Simak
- Child of All Ages by P. J. Plauger
- The Worm That Flies by Brian W. Aldiss
- The Secret by Jack Vance
- The Dying Man by Damon Knight
- Death Do Us Part by Robert Silverberg
- Mortimer Gray's History of Death by Brian Stableford
