= Dogtales! =

1988 anthology edited by Jack Dann and Gardner Dozois

- Cover of first edition.
- Editors: Jack Dann and Gardner Dozois
- Cover artist: Hiro Kimura
- Language: English
- Series: Jack Dann and Gardner Dozois Ace anthology series
- Genre: Science fiction
- Publisher: Ace Books
- Publication date: 1988
- Publication place: United States
- Media type: Print (paperback)
- Pages: 274
- ISBN: 0-441-15760-2
- Preceded by: Demons!
- Followed by: Seaserpents!

Dogtales! is a themed anthology of science fiction short works edited by American writers Jack Dann and Gardner Dozois. It was first published in paperback by Ace Books in September 1988. It was reissued as an ebook by Baen Books in June 2013.

The book collects fifteen novellas, novelettes and short stories by various science fiction authors, together with a bibliography of further reading by the editors.

== Contents ==
- "Auto-da-Fe" (Damon Knight)
- "Roog" (Philip K. Dick)
- "The Hounds" (Kate Wilhelm)
- "The Howling Tower" (Fritz Leiber)
- "Demon Lover" (M. Sargent Mackay)
- "A Few Kindred Spirits" (John Christopher)
- "Dogs' Lives" (Michael Bishop)
- "Here, Putzi!" (L. Sprague de Camp and Fletcher Pratt)
- "Desertion" (Clifford D. Simak)
- "I Lost My Love to the Space Shuttle Columbia" (Damien Broderick)
- "The Master of the Hounds" (Algis Budrys)
- "One-Trick Dog" (Bruce Boston)
- "Friend's Best Man" (Jonathan Carroll)
- "Wish Hound" (Pat Murphy)
- "A Boy and His Dog" (Harlan Ellison)
- "Further Reading" (Jack Dann and Gardner Dozois)
