= Futures Past =

2006 anthology edited by Jack Dann and Gardner Dozois

- Cover of first edition
- Editors: Jack Dann and Gardner Dozois
- Language: English
- Series: Jack Dann and Gardner Dozois Ace anthology series
- Genre: Science fiction
- Publisher: Ace Books
- Publication date: 2006
- Publication place: United States
- Media type: Print (Paperback)
- Pages: 290
- ISBN: 978-0-441-01454-5
- OCLC: 74315921
- LC Class: CPB Box no. 2681 vol. 5
- Preceded by: Beyond Singularity
- Followed by: Dangerous Games

Futures Past (2006, ISBN 978-0-441-01454-5) is a science fiction anthology edited by American writers Jack Dann and Gardner Dozois. It was published in 2006, and includes stories on the theme of "futures past" that were originally published from 1956 to 2004. It is the 34th book in their anthology series for Ace Books.

== Contents ==
The book itself, as well as each of the stories, has a short preface by the editors.

- L. Sprague de Camp: "Aristotle and the Gun" (1958)
- William Sanders: "Sitka" (2004)
- Poul Anderson: "The Only Game in Town" (1960)
- Jack Dann and Gardner Dozois: "Playing the Game" (1981)
- Robert Reed: "Killing the Morrow" (1996)
- R. A. Lafferty: "Thus We Frustrate Charlemagne" (1967)
- Roger Zelazny: "The Game of Blood and Dust" (1975)
- Howard Waldrop: "Calling Your Name" (2003)
- Damon Knight: "What Rough Beast" (1958)
- Avram Davidson: "O Brave New World!" (1975)
- Michael Swanwick: "Radiant Doors" (1998)
- Kage Baker: "The Hotel at Harlan's Landing" (2002)
- Bruce Sterling and Lewis Shiner: "Mozart in Mirrorshades" (1985)
- George R. R. Martin: "Under Siege" (1985)
