= Clones (anthology) =

1998 anthology edited by Jack Dann and Gardner Dozois

- First edition
- Editors: Jack Dann and Gardner Dozois
- Cover artist: Lee MacLeod
- Language: English
- Series: Jack Dann and Gardner Dozois Ace anthology series
- Genre: Science fiction
- Publisher: Ace Books
- Publication date: 1998
- Publication place: United States
- Media type: Print (paperback)
- Pages: 258
- ISBN: 0-441-00522-5
- Preceded by: Timegates
- Followed by: Immortals

Clones (ISBN 0-441-00522-5) is a 1998 anthology of science fiction short stories revolving around cloning edited by Jack Dann and Gardner Dozois. Clones is part of the long-running Jack Dann and Gardner Dozois Ace anthology series.

== Contents ==
- "The Extra" (Greg Egan)
- "The Phantom of Kansas" (John Varley)
- "Nine Lives" (Ursula K. Le Guin)
- "Past Magic" (Ian R. MacLeod)
- "Where Late the Sweet Birds Sang" (Kate Wilhelm)
- "Out of Copyright" (Charles Sheffield)
- "Mary" (Damon Knight)
- "Clone Sister" (Pamela Sargent)
- "Blood Sisters" (Joe Haldeman)
