= Bestiary! =

1985 anthology edited by Jack Dann and Gardner Dozois

- Cover illustration.
- Editors: Jack Dann and Gardner Dozois
- Cover artist: Carl Lundgren
- Language: English
- Series: Jack Dann and Gardner Dozois Ace anthology series
- Genre: Fantasy
- Publisher: Ace Books
- Publication date: 1985
- Publication place: United States
- Media type: Print (Paperback)
- Pages: 306
- ISBN: 0-441-05506-0
- Preceded by: Magicats!
- Followed by: Mermaids!

Bestiary! is an anthology of fantasy short stories, edited by American writers Jack Dann and Gardner Dozois. It was first published in paperback by Ace Books in October 1985, and reprinted in 1986.

The book collects eighteen novelettes and short stories by various authors featuring imaginary creatures out of myth and legend including the dragon, unicorn, giant, centaur, dryad, minotaur, sphinx, sea serpent, phoenix, troll, griffin, and pegasus, together with a preface and brief essays on the creatures by the editors.

== Contents ==
- "Preface" (Jack Dann and Gardner Dozois)
- "The Dragon" (Jack Dann and Gardner Dozois)
  - "The Man Who Painted the Dragon Griaule" (Lucius Shepard)
  - "Draco, Draco" (Tanith Lee)
  - "The Rule of Names" (Ursula K. Le Guin)
- "The Unicorn" (Jack Dann and Gardner Dozois)
  - "The Black Horn" (Jack Dann)
- "The Giant" (Jack Dann and Gardner Dozois)
  - "Walk Like a Mountain" (Manly Wade Wellman)
- "The Centaur" (Jack Dann and Gardner Dozois)
  - "Treaty in Tartessos" (Karen Anderson)
  - "The Woman Who Loved the Centaur Pholus" (Gene Wolfe)
- "The Dryad" (Jack Dann and Gardner Dozois)
  - "The Sleep of Trees" (Jane Yolen)
  - "The Hardwood Pile" (L. Sprague de Camp)
- "The Minotaur" (Jack Dann and Gardner Dozois)
  - "The Blind Minotaur" (Michael Swanwick)
- "The Sphinx" (Jack Dann and Gardner Dozois)
  - "Landscape With Sphinxes" (Karen Anderson)
  - "Simpson's Lesser Sphynx" (Esther M. Friesner)
- "The Sea Serpent" (Jack Dann and Gardner Dozois)
  - "God's Hooks!" (Howard Waldrop)
- "The Phoenix" (Jack Dann and Gardner Dozois)
  - "A Leg Full of Rubies" (Joan Aiken)
- "The Troll" (Jack Dann and Gardner Dozois)
  - "The Valor of Cappen Varra" (Poul Anderson)
  - "The Troll" (T. H. White)
- "The Griffin" (Jack Dann and Gardner Dozois)
  - "Return of the Griffins" (A. E. Sandeling)
- "The Pegasus" (Jack Dann and Gardner Dozois)
  - "The Last of His Breed" (Robert Chilson)
- "About the Editors" (Jack Dann and Gardner Dozois)
