= Beyond Flesh =

2002 anthology edited by Jack Dann and Gardner Dozois

- Cover of first edition
- Editors: Jack Dann and Gardner Dozois
- Cover artist: Jan Franz
- Language: English
- Series: Jack Dann and Gardner Dozois Ace anthology series
- Genre: Science fiction
- Publisher: Ace Books
- Publication date: 2002
- Publication place: United States
- Media type: Print (paperback)
- Pages: xi, 260
- ISBN: 0-441-00999-9
- Preceded by: Future Sports
- Followed by: Future Crimes

Beyond Flesh is a themed anthology of science fiction short works edited by American writers Jack Dann and Gardner Dozois. It was first published in paperback by Ace Books in December 2002. It was reissued as an ebook by Baen Books in March 2013.

The book collects ten novelettes and short stories by various science fiction authors, together with a preface by the editors.

== Contents ==
- "Preface" (Gardner Dozois and Jack Dann)
- "Call Me Joe" (Poul Anderson)
- "Learning to Be Me" (Greg Egan)
- "Pretty Boy Crossover" (Pat Cadigan)
- "Ancient Engines" (Michael Swanwick)
- "Winemaster" (Robert Reed)
- "More Adventures on Other Planets" (Michael Cassutt)
- "Nevermore" (Ian R. MacLeod)
- "Approaching Perimelasma" (Geoffrey A. Landis)
- "The Gravity Mine" (Stephen Baxter)
- "Reef" (Paul J. McAuley)
