= Beyond Singularity =

2005 anthology edited by Jack Dann and Gardner Dozois

- Cover of first edition
- Editors: Jack Dann and Gardner Dozois
- Cover artist: Ben Gibson
- Language: English
- Series: Jack Dann and Gardner Dozois Ace anthology series
- Genre: Science fiction
- Publisher: Ace Books
- Publication date: 2005
- Publication place: United States
- Media type: Print (Paperback)
- Pages: 288
- ISBN: 978-0-441-01363-0
- OCLC: 62349178
- LC Class: CPB Box no. 2431 vol. 14
- Preceded by: Robots
- Followed by: Futures Past

Beyond Singularity is a science fiction anthology edited by American writers Jack Dann and Gardner Dozois. It was published in 2005, and includes stories on the theme of "beyond singularity" that were originally published from 1960 to 2004, though mostly from the last few years of that range. It is the 33rd book in their anthology series for Ace Books.

The book itself, as well as each of the stories, has a short preface by the editors. The preface to the book discusses Vernor Vinge's role in popularizing the concept of the technological singularity, and credits Charles Stross with "[what] may be the most complete vision yet of life beyond the Singularity". Authors they credit with writing convincingly about the singularity who are not included in this book, are Brian Stableford, Stephen Baxter, Bruce Sterling, Greg Bear, Iain Banks, Nancy Kress, Alastair Reynolds, Peter F. Hamilton, Ian McDonald, and Vernor Vinge.

== Contents ==
- Brian W. Aldiss: "Old Hundredth" (1960)
- Greg Egan: "Border Guards" (1999)
- Charles Stross: "Rogue Farm" (2003)
- Paul J. McAuley: "All Tomorrow's Parties" (1997)
- Gregory Benford: "Naturals" (2003)
- Timons Esaias: "Osmund Considers" (2002)
- Robert Reed: "Coelacanths" (2002)
- Michael Swanwick: "The Dog Said Bow-Wow" (2001)
- James Patrick Kelly: "Barry Westphall Crashes the Singularity" (2002)
- Cory Doctorow and Charles Stross: "Flowers from Alice" (2003)
- Mary Rosenblum: "Tracker" (2004)
- Eric Brown: "Steps Along the Way" (1999)
- Walter Jon Williams: "The Millennium Party" (2002)
- Christopher Rowe: "The Voluntary State" (2004)
