= Armageddons =

1999 anthology edited by Jack Dann and Gardner Dozois

- Cover of first edition
- Editors: Jack Dann and Gardner Dozois
- Cover artist: Phil Heffernan
- Language: English
- Series: Jack Dann and Gardner Dozois Ace anthology series
- Genre: Science fiction
- Publisher: Ace Books
- Publication date: 1999
- Publication place: United States
- Media type: Print (paperback)
- Pages: xiii, 269
- ISBN: 0-441-00675-2
- Preceded by: Future War
- Followed by: Aliens Among Us

Armageddons is a themed anthology of science fiction short works edited by American writers Jack Dann and Gardner Dozois. It was first published in paperback by Ace Books in November 1999. It was reissued as an ebook by Baen Books in March 2013.

The book collects twelve novelettes and short stories by various science fiction authors.

== Contents ==
- "Fermi and Frost" (Frederik Pohl)
- "A Desperate Calculus" (Sterling Blake)
- "Evolution" (Nancy Kress)
- "A Message to the King of Brobdingnag" (Richard Cowper)
- "...The World As We Know't" (Howard Waldrop)
- "The Peacemaker" (Gardner Dozois)
- "The Screwfly Solution" (Raccoona Sheldon)
- "A Pail of Air" (Fritz Leiber)
- "The Great Nebraska Sea" (Allan Danzig)
- "Inconstant Moon" (Larry Niven)
- "The Last Sunset" (Geoffrey A. Landis)
- "Down in the Dark" (William Barton)
