= Genometry =

2001 anthology edited by Jack Dann and Gardner Dozois

- Cover of first edition
- Author: edited by Jack Dann and Gardner Dozois
- Cover artist: Walter Velez
- Language: English
- Series: Jack Dann and Gardner Dozois Ace anthology series
- Genre: Science fiction
- Publisher: Ace Books
- Publication date: 2001
- Publication place: United States
- Media type: Print (paperback)
- Pages: x, 272 pp.
- ISBN: 0-441-00797-X
- Preceded by: Aliens Among Us
- Followed by: Space Soldiers

Genometry is a themed anthology of science fiction short works edited by American writers Jack Dann and Gardner Dozois. It was first published in paperback by Ace Books in January 2001. It was reissued as an ebook by Baen Books in July 2013.

The book collects eleven novelettes and short stories by various science fiction authors.

== Contents ==
- "Preface" (Gardner Dozois and Jack Dann)
- "The Invisible Country" (Paul J. McAuley)
- "The Kindly Isle" (Frederik Pohl)
- "Chaff" (Greg Egan)
- "Stable Strategies for Middle Management" (Eileen Gunn)
- "Good With Rice" (John Brunner)
- "Sunken Gardens" (Bruce Sterling)
- "The Other Shore" (J. R. Dunn)
- "Written in Blood" (Chris Lawson)
- "The Pipes of Pan" (Brian Stableford)
- "Whiptail" (Robert Reed)
- "A Planet Named Shayol" (Cordwainer Smith)
