= Dragons! =

1993 anthology edited by Jack Dann and Gardner Dozois

- Cover of first edition.
- Editors: Jack Dann and Gardner Dozois
- Cover artist: Bob Eggleton
- Language: English
- Series: Jack Dann and Gardner Dozois Ace anthology series
- Genre: Fantasy
- Publisher: Ace Books
- Publication date: 1993
- Publication place: United States
- Media type: Print (paperback)
- Pages: 222
- ISBN: 0-441-16631-8
- Preceded by: Unicorns II
- Followed by: Invaders!

Dragons! is a themed anthology of fantasy short works edited by American writers Jack Dann and Gardner Dozois. It was first published in trade paperback by Ace Books in August 1993, and as an ebook by Baen Books in July 2013.

The book collects ten novelettes and short stories by various authors, together with a general preface by the editors and a bibliography of further reading.

== Contents ==
- "Preface" (Gardner Dozois and Jack Dann)
- "Draco, Draco" (Tanith Lee)
- "Two Yards of Dragon" (L. Sprague de Camp)
- "Mrs. Byres and the Dragon" (Keith Roberts)
- "A Handful of Hatchlings" (Mark C. Sumner)
- "Covenant With a Dragon" (Susan Casper)
- "Paper Dragons" (James P. Blaylock)
- "Up the Wall" (Esther M. Friesner)
- "Lan Lung" (M. Lucie Chin)
- "Climacteric" (Avram Davidson)
- "The Man Who Painted the Dragon Griaule" (Lucius Shepard)
- "Further Reading"
