= Demons! =

1987 anthology edited by Jack Dann and Gardner Dozois

- Cover of first edition.
- Editors: Jack Dann and Gardner Dozois
- Cover artist: Hiro Kimura
- Language: English
- Series: Jack Dann and Gardner Dozois Ace anthology series
- Genre: Fantasy
- Publisher: Ace Books
- Publication date: 1987
- Publication place: United States
- Media type: Print (paperback)
- Pages: 278
- ISBN: 0-441-14264-8
- Preceded by: Sorcerers!
- Followed by: Dogtales!

Demons! is a themed anthology of fantasy short works edited by American writers Jack Dann and Gardner Dozois. It was first published in paperback by Ace Books in July 1987. It was reissued as an ebook by Baen Books in March 2013.

The book collects fourteen novelettes and short stories by various science fiction authors, together with a bibliography of further reading by the editors.

== Contents ==
- "Grail" (Harlan Ellison)
- "The Willow Platform" (Joseph Payne Brennan)
- "The Night of White Bhairab" (Lucius Shepard)
- "The Mangler" (Stephen King)
- "The Last Demon" (Isaac Bashevis Singer)
- "The Golden Rope" (Tanith Lee)
- "Basileus" (Robert Silverberg)
- "Twilla" (Tom Reamy)
- "The Purple Pterodactyls" (L. Sprague de Camp)
- "Goslin Day" (Avram Davidson)
- "Nellthu" (Anthony Boucher)
- "Snulbug" (Anthony Boucher)
- "One Other" (Manly Wade Wellman)
- "An Ornament to His Profession" (Charles L. Harness)
- "Further Reading" (Gardner Dozois and Jack Dann)
