= Wandering Stars (anthology) =

1974 anthology of Jewish fiction

Wandering Stars: An Anthology of Jewish Fantasy and Science Fiction
- First edition
- Editor: Jack Dann
- Cover artist: Mark Rubin
- Language: English
- Genre: Science fiction
- Publisher: Harper & Row
- Publication date: January 1974
- Publication place: United States
- Pages: 239
- ISBN: 0-06-010944-0
- Followed by: More Wandering Stars

Wandering Stars is an anthology of Jewish fantasy and science fiction, edited by American writer Jack Dann, originally published by Harper & Row in 1974. It represented, according to the book cover, "the first time in science fiction that the Jew - and the richness of his themes and particular points of view -- will appear without a mask." In his introduction, "Why Me?", Isaac Asimov discussed how many Jewish science fiction writers prior to that time had used gentile pen names in order to get published: "Many of the Jewish pulp writers, however, used pen names as a matter of sound business. A story entitled "War Gods of the Oyster-Men of Deneb" did not carry conviction if it was written by someone named Chaim Itzkowitz." He then goes on to discuss the pen names of various Jewish writers included in this book.

It was followed by a second anthology, More Wandering Stars, also edited by Jack Dann, published by Doubleday in 1981.

== Contents ==
- Introduction: "Why Me?" by Isaac Asimov
- "On Venus, Have We Got a Rabbi!" by William Tenn
- "The Golem" by Avram Davidson
- "Unto the Fourth Generation" by Isaac Asimov
- "Look, You Think You've Got Troubles" by Carol Carr
- "Goslin Day" by Avram Davidson
- "The Dybbuk of Mazel Tov IV" by Robert Silverberg
- "Trouble with Water" by Horace L. Gold
- "Gather Blue Roses" by Pamela Sargent
- "The Jew Bird" by Bernard Malamud
- "Paradise Last" by Geo. Alec Effinger
- "Street of Dreams, Feet of Clay" by Robert Sheckley
- "Jachid and Jechidah" by Isaac Bashevis Singer
- "I'm Looking for Kadak" by Harlan Ellison
