= Aliens Among Us =

2000 anthology edited by Jack Dann and Gardner Dozois

- Cover of first edition
- Editors: Jack Dann and Gardner Dozois
- Cover artist: Walter Velez
- Language: English
- Series: Jack Dann and Gardner Dozois Ace anthology series
- Genre: Science fiction
- Publisher: Ace Books
- Publication date: 2000
- Publication place: United States
- Media type: Print (paperback)
- Pages: x, 292
- ISBN: 0-441-00704-X
- Preceded by: Armageddons
- Followed by: Genometry

Aliens Among Us is a themed anthology of science fiction short works edited by American writers Jack Dann and Gardner Dozois. It was first published in paperback by Ace Books in June 2000. It was reissued as an ebook by Baen Books in October 2014.

The book collects fifteen novellas, novelettes and short stories by various science fiction authors.

== Contents ==
- "Preface" (Jack Dann and Gardner Dozois)
- "The Other Celia" (Theodore Sturgeon)
- "Residuals" (Paul J. McAuley and Kim Newman)
- "Eight O'Clock in the Morning" (Ray Nelson)
- "Expendable" (Philip K. Dick)
- "The Reality Trip" (Robert Silverberg)
- "Decency" (Robert Reed)
- "The Mindworm" (C. M. Kornbluth)
- "Popeye and Pops Watch the Evening World Report" (Eliot Fintushel)
- "The Autopsy" (Michael Shea)
- "Or All the Seas with Oysters" (Avram Davidson)
- "Angel" (Pat Cadigan)
- "Among the Hairy Earthmen" (R. A. Lafferty)
- "I'm Too Big but I Love to Play" (James Tiptree, Jr.)
- "The Hero as Werwolf" (Gene Wolfe)
- "Motherhood, Etc." (L. Timmel Duchamp)
