= Sorcerers! =

Science fiction anthology

- Cover of first edition
- Editors: Jack Dann and Gardner Dozois
- Cover artist: Dean Morrissey
- Language: English
- Series: Jack Dann and Gardner Dozois Ace anthology series
- Genre: Fantasy
- Publisher: Ace Books
- Publication date: 1986
- Publication place: United States
- Media type: Print (paperback)
- Pages: xi, 244
- ISBN: 0-441-77532-2
- Preceded by: Mermaids!
- Followed by: Demons!

Sorcerers! is a themed anthology of science fiction short works edited by Jack Dann and Gardner Dozois. It was first published in paperback by Ace Books in October 1986. It was reissued as an ebook by Baen Books in July 2013.

The book collects thirteen novellas, novelettes and short stories by various authors, together with a preface and bibliography of recommended reading by the editors.

== Contents ==
- "Preface" (Jack Dann and Gardner Dozois)
- "The Bleak Shore" (Fritz Leiber)
- "O Ugly Bird!" (Manly Wade Wellman)
- "The Power of the Press" (Richard Kearns)
- "The Finger" (Naomi Mitchison)
- "The Word of Unbinding" (Ursula K. Le Guin)
- "His Coat So Gay" (Sterling E. Lanier)
- "Narrow Valley" (R. A. Lafferty)
- "Sleep Well of Nights" (Avram Davidson)
- "Armaja Das" (Joe W. Haldeman)
- "My Boat" (Joanna Russ)
- "The Hag Séleen" (Theodore Sturgeon [and James H. Beard])
- "The Last Wizard" (Avram Davidson)
- "The Overworld" (Jack Vance)
- "Recommended Reading" (Jack Dann and Gardner Dozois)
