= Magicats II =

1991 anthology edited by Jack Dann and Gardner Dozois

- Cover of first edition
- Editors: Jack Dann and Gardner Dozois
- Cover artist: Jim Warren
- Language: English
- Series: Jack Dann and Gardner Dozois Ace anthology series
- Genre: Fantasy
- Publisher: Ace Books
- Publication date: 1991
- Publication place: United States
- Media type: Print (paperback)
- Pages: 213
- ISBN: 0-441-51533-9
- Preceded by: Little People!
- Followed by: Unicorns II

Magicats II is a themed anthology of fantasy short works edited by Jack Dann and Gardner Dozois. It was first published in paperback by Ace Books in December 1991. It was reissued as an ebook by Baen Books in March 2013. The book has been translated into German.

== Summary ==
The book collects twelve novellas, novelettes and short stories by various authors.

== Contents ==
- "Kreativity for Kats" (Fritz Leiber)
- "Life Regarded as a Jigsaw Puzzle of Highly Lustrous Cats" (Michael Bishop)
- "Bright Burning Tiger" (Tanith Lee)
- "I Love Little Pussy" (Isaac Asimov)
- "The Boy Who Spoke Cat" (Ward Moore)
- "The Jaguar Hunter" (Lucius Shepard)
- "The Sin of Madame Phloi" (Lilian Jackson Braun)
- "The Mountain Cage" (Pamela Sargent)
- "May's Lion" (Ursula K. Le Guin)
- "The Color of Grass, the Color of Blood" (R. V. Barnham)
- "A Word to the Wise" (John Collier)
- "Duke Pasquale's Ring" (Avram Davidson)

== Reception ==
The anthology was reviewed by Fred Patten in Yarf! The Journal of Applied Anthropomorphics #29, 1994.
