= Unicorns! =

Fantasy anthology edited by Jack Dann and Gardner Dozois

- Cover of first edition
- Editors: Jack Dann and Gardner Dozois
- Language: English
- Series: Jack Dann and Gardner Dozois Ace anthology series
- Genre: Fantasy
- Publisher: Ace Books
- Publication date: 1982
- Publication place: United States
- Media type: Print (paperback)
- Pages: 310
- ISBN: 0-441-85441-9
- Preceded by: Aliens!
- Followed by: Magicats!

Unicorns! is a themed anthology of fantasy short works edited by American writers Jack Dann and Gardner Dozois, first published in 1982. Their follow-up anthology, Unicorns II, debuted ten years later in 1992.

== Unicorns! ==
It was first published in paperback by Ace Books in May 1982, and reprinted by the same publisher in November 1982, June 1984, and October 1984. It was reissued as an ebook by Baen Books in March 2013. The book has also been translated into German.

The volume collects sixteen short stories by various science fiction authors, together with a historical essay on the role of unicorns in modern fiction by Avram Davidson. The stories were sourced from pulp magazines, with the exception of "The Unicorn" by T. H. White, which is a well-known chapter from his book, Once and Future King, telling the story of "the hunting and killing of the beast of innocence". It also includes a bibliography of further reading.

In his review of the anthology for Mythlore, Thomas M. Egan wrote that although four of the works by L. Sprague de Camp, Roger Zelazny, Larry Niven, and Gardner Dozois were lighter in tone, "it's the tragic element and the use of the innocence of the unicorn that is stressed in most tales." The beauty of the unicorn contrasts with the ugliness of the modern state and society in the stories by Stephen R. Donaldson, Vonda N. McIntyre, and Gene Wolfe. Other notable science fiction writers whose stories are featured include Harlan Ellison, Ursula K. Le Guin, Theodore Sturgeon, Beverly Evans, Frank Owen, Eric Norden, and Thomas Burnett Swann.

== Contents ==
- "Introduction" (Jack Dann and Gardner Dozois)
- "The Spoor of the Unicorn" (Avram Davidson)
- "The Silken-Swift" (Theodore Sturgeon)
- "Eudoric's Unicorn" (L. Sprague de Camp)
- "The Flight of the Horse" (Larry Niven)
- "On the Downhill Side" (Harlan Ellison)
- "The Night of the Unicorn" (Thomas Burnett Swann)
- "Mythological Beast" (Stephen R. Donaldson)
- "The Final Quarry" (Eric Norden)
- "Elfleda" (Vonda N. McIntyre)
- "The White Donkey" (Ursula K. Le Guin)
- "Unicorn Variation" (Roger Zelazny)
- "The Sacrifice" (Gardner Dozois)
- "The Unicorn" (Frank Owen)
- "The Woman the Unicorn Loved" (Gene Wolfe)
- "The Forsaken" (Beverly Evans)
- "The Unicorn" (T. H. White)
- "I Love Them" (Scrump the Texan)
- "Selected Bibliography"

== Unicorns II ==
Unicorns II
- Cover of first edition.
- Editors: Jack Dann and Gardner Dozois
- Cover artist: Neal McPheeters
- Language: English
- Series: Jack Dann and Gardner Dozois Ace anthology series
- Genre: Fantasy
- Publisher: Ace Books
- Publication date: 1992
- Publication place: United States
- Media type: Print (paperback)
- Pages: 241
- ISBN: 0-441-84564-9
- Preceded by: Magicats II
- Followed by: Dragons!

Unicorns II is a themed anthology of fantasy short works about unicorns edited by American writers Jack Dann and Gardner Dozois. It was first published in paperback by Ace Books in November 1992, and was "noted without comment" in The Year's Best Science Fiction. It was reissued as an ebook by Baen Books in March 2013.

The edited volume includes ten short stories reprinted from periodicals and anthologies, which were first published between 1984 and 1991, plus two which were new. The two original works were "Ghost Town" by Jack C. Haldeman II and "Unicornucopia" by Lawrence Watt-Evans. Each of the twelve stories has its own introduction. The book also contains a two-page preface and a bibliography.

== Unicorns II contents ==
- "Preface" (Gardner Dozois and Jack Dann)
- "The Calling of Paisley Coldpony" (Michael Bishop)
- "Unicornucopia" (Lawrence Watt-Evans)
- "The Black Horn" (Jack Dann)
- "The Hole in Edgar's Hillside" (Gregory Frost)
- "The Hunting of Death: The Unicorn" (Tanith Lee)
- "Stalking the Unicorn with Gun and Camera" (Mike Resnick)
- "The Boy Who Drew Unicorns" (Jane Yolen)
- "Ghost Town" (Jack C. Haldeman II)
- "The Stray" (Gardner Dozois and Susan Casper)
- "The Shade of Lo Man Gong" (William F. Wu)
- "The Princess, the Cat, and the Unicorn" (Patricia C. Wrede)
- "Naked Wish-Fulfillment" (Janet Kagan)
- "Selected Bibliography"

== Reception ==
David Dunham reviewed Unicorns! for Different Worlds magazine and stated that "Unicorns seem to be the latest fad, judging by the plethora of unicorn merchandise available nowadays, and I was afraid this book might be just another attempt to cash in on the fad. Whether or not it is, Unicorns! stands on its own as a worthy collection. It contains an essay and fifteen stories about unicorns, including Roger Zelazny's Hugo-winning novelette, 'Unicorn Variations,' as well as a bibliography (an inclusion I applaud). While only two of the pieces are new, I had only seen a few of the others before."

== Reviews ==
- Review by Keith Soltys (1982) in Science Fiction & Fantasy Book Review, #7, September 1982
- Review by Ellen Kushner (1982) in Heavy Metal, December 1982
- Review by Thomas A. Easton [as by Tom Easton] (1983) in Analog Science Fiction/Science Fact, January 1983
- Review by Nick Lowe (1983) in Paperback Inferno, Volume 7, Number 1
