= Morning Child =

1984 short story by Gardner Dozois

2004 collection (publ. ibooks Inc)

"Morning Child" (1984) is a science fiction short story written by Gardner Dozois. It was reprinted in Best SF of the Year 14 (edited by Terry Carr), Nebula Awards 20 (edited by George Zebrowski) and in Dozois's own collection, Geodesic Dreams (1992). More recently, it was republished as the title story for Dozois's short fiction collection, Morning Child and Other Stories (2004 and 2012).

== Awards ==
It won the Nebula Award in 1984 for Best Short Story, and was nominated for the Locus Poll Award and SF Chronicle Award.
