= Future Crimes =

2003 anthology edited by Jack Dann and Gardner Dozois

- Cover of first edition
- Editors: Jack Dann and Gardner Dozois
- Cover artist: Getty Images
- Language: English
- Series: Jack Dann and Gardner Dozois Ace anthology series
- Genre: Science fiction
- Publisher: Ace Books
- Publication date: 2003
- Publication place: United States
- Media type: Print (paperback)
- Pages: x, 276
- ISBN: 0-441-01118-7
- Preceded by: Beyond Flesh
- Followed by: A.I.s

Future Crimes is a themed anthology of science fiction short works edited by American writers Jack Dann and Gardner Dozois. It was first published in paperback by Ace Books in December 2003. It was reissued as an ebook by Baen Books in March 2013.

The book collects eight novellas, novelettes and short stories by various science fiction authors, together with a preface and brief introductions to each story by the editors.

== Contents ==
- "Preface" (Gardner Dozois and Jack Dann)
- "The Dog Said Bow-Wow" (Michael Swanwick)
- "A Scraping at the Bones" (Algis Budrys)
- "The Retrieval Artist" (Kristine Kathryn Rusch)
- ""Repent, Harlequin!" Said the Ticktockman" (Harlan Ellison)
- "Time Bum" (C. M. Kornbluth)
- "Mercurial" (Kim Stanley Robinson)
- "Taking the Piss" (Brian Stableford)
- "Death of Reason" (Tony Daniel)
