= Invaders! (anthology) =

1993 anthology edited by Jack Dann and Gardner Dozois

- Cover of first edition
- Editors: Jack Dann and Gardner Dozois
- Cover artist: Joan Pelaez
- Language: English
- Series: Jack Dann and Gardner Dozois Ace anthology series
- Genre: Science fiction
- Publisher: Ace Books
- Publication date: 1993
- Publication place: United States
- Media type: Print (paperback)
- Pages: 241
- ISBN: 0-441-01519-0
- Preceded by: Dragons!
- Followed by: Horses!

Invaders! is a themed anthology of science fiction short works edited by Jack Dann and Gardner Dozois. It was first published in paperback by Ace Books in December 1993. It was reissued as an ebook by Baen Books in March 2013.

The book collects fifteen novelettes and short stories by various science fiction authors, with a bibliography.

== Contents ==
- "Bloodchild" (Octavia E. Butler)
- "Idiot Stick" (Damon Knight)
- "Guesting Time" (R. A. Lafferty)
- "Trading Post" (Neal Barrett, Jr.)
- "And I Awoke and Found Me Here on the Cold Hill's Side" (James Tiptree, Jr.)
- "Night of the Cooters" (Howard Waldrop)
- "Roadside Rescue" (Pat Cadigan)
- "The Liberation of Earth" (William Tenn)
- "Roog" (Philip K. Dick)
- "Speed Trap" (Frederik Pohl)
- "The Perfect Host" (Robert Silverberg)
- "Heresies of the Huge God" (Brian W. Aldiss)
- "Sepoy" (Tom Purdom)
- "Dress Rehearsal" (Harvey Jacobs)
- "The Screwfly Solution" (Raccoona Sheldon)
- "Further Reading"
