= Magicats! =

1984 anthology edited by Jack Dann and Gardner Dozois

- Cover of first edition
- Editors: Jack Dann and Gardner Dozois
- Cover artist: Ann Meisel
- Language: English
- Series: Jack Dann and Gardner Dozois Ace anthology series
- Genre: Fantasy
- Publisher: Ace Books
- Publication date: 1984
- Publication place: United States
- Media type: Print (paperback)
- Pages: xvii, 270
- ISBN: 0-441-51530-4
- Preceded by: Unicorns!
- Followed by: Bestiary!

Magicats! is a themed anthology of fantasy short works edited by Jack Dann and Gardner Dozois. It was first published in paperback by Ace Books in June 1984. It was reissued as an ebook by Baen Books in March 2013. It has also been translated into Dutch.

The book collects eighteen novelettes and short stories by various authors, together with a preface by the editors.

== Contents ==
- "Preface" (Gardner Dozois and Jack Dann)
- "Space-Time for Springers" (Fritz Leiber)
- "The Game of Rat and Dragon" (Cordwainer Smith)
- "The Cat from Hell" (Stephen King)
- "Out of Place" (Pamela Sargent)
- "Schrödinger's Cat" (Ursula K. Le Guin)
- "Groucho" (Ron Goulart)
- "My Father, the Cat" (Henry Slesar)
- "The Cat Man" (Byron Liggett)
- "Some Are Born Cats" (Terry Carr and Carol Carr)
- "The Cat Lover" (Knox Burger)
- "Jade Blue" (Edward Bryant)
- "Tom Cat" (Gary Jennings)
- "Sonya, Crane Wessleman, and Kittee" (Gene Wolfe)
- "The Witch's Cat" (Manly Wade Wellman)
- "Antiquities" (John Crowley)
- "A Little Intelligence" (Randall Garrett [and Robert Silverberg])
- "The Cat" (Gene Wolfe)
- "Afternoon at Schrafft's" (Gardner Dozois, Jack Dann and Michael Swanwick)
