= Nanotech (anthology) =

1998 anthology edited by Jack Dann and Gardner Dozois

- First edition
- Editors: Jack Dann and Gardner Dozois
- Cover artist: Doug Struthers
- Language: English
- Series: Jack Dann and Gardner Dozois Ace anthology series
- Genre: Science fiction
- Publisher: Ace Books
- Publication date: 1998
- Publication place: United States
- Media type: Print (Paperback)
- Pages: 276
- ISBN: 0-441-00585-3
- OCLC: 40448509
- Preceded by: Immortals
- Followed by: Future War

Nanotech is a 1998 anthology of science fiction short stories revolving around nanotechnology and its effects. It is edited by American writers Jack Dann and Gardner Dozois.

== Contents ==
- "Blood Music" by Greg Bear
- "Margin of Error" by Nancy Kress
- "Axiomatic" by Greg Egan
- "Remember'd Kisses" by Michael F. Flynn
- "Recording Angel" by Ian McDonald
- "Sunflowers" by Kathleen Ann Goonan
- "The Logic Pool" Stephen Baxter
- "Any Major Dude" Paul Di Filippo
- "We Were Out of Our Minds with Joy" by David Marusek
- "Willy in the Nano-lab" by Geoffrey A. Landis
