= Robots (Ace anthology) =

- Cover of first edition
- Editors: Jack Dann and Gardner Dozois
- Language: English
- Series: Jack Dann and Gardner Dozois Ace anthology series
- Genre: Science fiction
- Publisher: Ace Books
- Publication date: 2005
- Publication place: United States
- Media type: Print (Paperback)
- Pages: 305
- ISBN: 978-0-441-01321-0
- OCLC: 61343992
- Dewey Decimal: 813/.0876208 22
- LC Class: PS648.S3 R63 2005
- Preceded by: A.I.s
- Followed by: Beyond Singularity

Robots (ISBN 978-0441013210) is a science fiction anthology edited by American writers Jack Dann and Gardner Dozois. It was published in 2005, and includes stories on the theme of "robots" that were originally published from 1985 to 2003, though mostly from the last few years of that range. It is the 32nd book in their anthology series for Ace Books.

== Contents ==
- James Patrick Kelly: "Itsy Bitsy Spider" (1997)
- Mike Resnick: "Robots Don't Cry" (2003)
- Howard Waldrop: "London, Paris, Banana" (2000)
- Chris Beckett: "La Macchina" (1991)
- Geoff Ryman: "Warmth" (1995)
- Michael Swanwick: "Ancient Engines" (1998)
- Alex Irvine: "Jimmy Guang's House of Gladmech" (2002)
- Benjamin Rosenbaum: "Droplet" (2002)
- Gene Wolfe: "Counting Cats in Zanzibar" (1996)
- Steven Popkes: "The Birds of Isla Mujeres" (2003)
- Howard Waldrop: "Heirs of the Perisphere" (1985)
- Tony Daniel: "The Robot's Twilight Companion" (1996)
