= A.I.s =

2004 anthology edited by Jack Dann and Gardner Dozois

- Cover of first edition
- Editors: Jack Dann and Gardner Dozois
- Cover artist: AXB Group
- Language: English
- Series: Jack Dann and Gardner Dozois Ace anthology series
- Genre: Science fiction
- Publisher: Ace Books
- Publication date: 2004
- Publication place: United States
- Media type: Print (paperback)
- Pages: x, 294
- ISBN: 0-441-01216-7
- Preceded by: Future Crimes
- Followed by: Robots

A.I.s is a themed anthology of science fiction short works edited by American writers Jack Dann and Gardner Dozois. It was first published in paperback by Ace Books in December 2004. It was reissued as an ebook by Baen Books in June 2013.

The book collects ten novelettes and short stories by various science fiction authors, together with a preface by the editors.

== Contents ==
- "Preface" (Jack Dann and Gardner Dozois)
- "Antibodies" (Charles Stross)
- "Trojan Horse" (Michael Swanwick)
- "Birth Day" (Robert Reed)
- "The Hydrogen Wall" (Gregory Benford)
- "The Turing Test" (Chris Beckett)
- "Dante Dreams" (Stephen Baxter)
- "The Names of All the Spirits" (J. R. Dunn)
- "From the Corner of My Eye" (Alexander Glass)
- "Halfjack" (Roger Zelazny)
- "Computer Virus" (Nancy Kress)
