= Little People! (book) =

1991 anthology edited by Jack Dann and Gardner Dozois

- Cover of first edition.
- Editors: Jack Dann and Gardner Dozois
- Cover artist: Daniel R. Horne
- Language: English
- Series: Jack Dann and Gardner Dozois Ace anthology series
- Genre: Fantasy
- Publisher: Ace Books
- Publication date: 1991
- Publication place: United States
- Media type: Print (paperback)
- Pages: 221
- ISBN: 0-441-50391-8
- Preceded by: Dinosaurs!
- Followed by: Magicats II

Little People! is a themed anthology of fantasy short works edited by American writers Jack Dann and Gardner Dozois. It was first published in paperback by Ace Books in March 1991. It was reissued as an ebook by Baen Books in July 2013.

The book collects eleven novellas, novelettes and short stories by various speculative fiction authors, together with a bibliography of further reading by the editors.

== Contents ==
- "Working With the Little People" (Harlan Ellison)
- "United Imp" (L. Sprague de Camp)
- "A Cabin on the Coast" (Gene Wolfe)
- "Cargo" (Theodore Sturgeon)
- "Housing Problem" (Henry Kuttner and C. L. Moore (as Kuttner alone)
- "The Goobers" (Avram Davidson)
- "Fairy Tale" (Jack M. Dann)
- "A Gift of the People" (Robert Sampson)
- "Trouble with Water" (Horace L. Gold)
- "Send No Money" (Gardner Dozois and Susan Casper)
- "The Hob" (Judith Moffett)
- "Further Reading" (Jack Dann and Gardner Dozois)
