= Future Sports =

2002 anthology edited by Jack Dann and Gardner Dozois

- Cover of first edition
- Editors: Jack Dann and Gardner Dozois
- Cover artist: Ben Gibson
- Language: English
- Series: Jack Dann and Gardner Dozois Ace anthology series
- Genre: Science fiction
- Publisher: Ace Books
- Publication date: 2002
- Publication place: United States
- Media type: Print (paperback)
- Pages: x, 257
- ISBN: 0-441-00961-1
- Preceded by: Space Soldiers
- Followed by: Beyond Flesh

Future Sports is a themed anthology of science fiction short works edited by American writers Jack Dann and Gardner Dozois. It was first published in paperback by Ace Books in June 2002. It was reissued as an ebook by Baen Books in June 2013.

The book collects ten novelettes and short stories by various science fiction authors, together with a preface by the editors.

== Contents ==
- "Preface" (Jack Dann and Gardner Dozois)
- "The Wind from the Sun" (Arthur C. Clarke)
- "Arthur Sternbach Brings the Curveball to Mars" (Kim Stanley Robinson)
- "Man-Mountain Gentian" (Howard Waldrop)
- "Winning" (Ian McDonald)
- "The Dead" (Michael Swanwick)
- "Game of the Century" (Robert Reed)
- "Streak" (Andrew Weiner)
- "The Holy Stomper vs. the Alien Barrel of Death" (R. Neube)
- "Stroboscopic" (Alastair Reynolds)
- "Vanilla Dunk" (Jonathan Lethem)
