= Space Soldiers =

2001 anthology edited by Jack Dann and Gardner Dozois

- Cover of first edition
- Editors: Jack Dann and Gardner Dozois
- Cover artist: Lee MacLeod
- Language: English
- Series: Jack Dann and Gardner Dozois Ace anthology series
- Genre: Science fiction
- Publisher: Ace Books
- Publication date: 2001
- Publication place: United States
- Media type: Print (paperback)
- Pages: 280
- ISBN: 0-441-00824-0
- Preceded by: Genometry
- Followed by: Future Sports

Space Soldiers is a themed anthology of science fiction short works edited by Jack Dann and Gardner Dozois. It was first published in paperback by Ace Books in April 2001. It was reissued as an ebook by Baen Books in July 2013.

The book collects nine novelettes and short stories by various science fiction authors, with a preface by the editors.

== Contents ==
- "Preface" (Jack Dann and Gardner Dozois)
- "The Gardens of Saturn" (Paul J. McAuley)
- "Soldiers Home" (William Barton)
- "Legacies" (Tom Purdom)
- "Moon Duel" (Fritz Leiber)
- "Savior" (Robert Reed)
- "Galactic North" (Alastair Reynolds)
- "Masque of the Red Shift" (Fred Saberhagen)
- "Time Piece" (Joe Haldeman)
- "On the Orion Line" (Stephen Baxter)
