= Dinosaurs! (1990 anthology) =

1990 anthology

- Cover of first edition
- Editors: Jack Dann and Gardner Dozois
- Cover artist: Bob Walters
- Language: English
- Series: Jack Dann and Gardner Dozois Ace anthology series
- Genre: Science fiction
- Publisher: Ace Books
- Publication date: 1990
- Publication place: United States
- Media type: Print (paperback)
- Pages: 226
- ISBN: 0-441-14883-2
- Preceded by: Seaserpents!
- Followed by: Little People!

Dinosaurs! is a themed anthology of science fiction short works edited by Jack Dann and Gardner Dozois. It was first published in paperback by Ace Books in June 1990, and as an ebook by Baen Books in November 2014.

The book collects fourteen novelettes and short stories by various science fiction authors, together with a general preface by the editors.

A second dinosaur-themed anthology, Dinosaurs II, was published in 1995.

== Contents ==
- "Preface" (Jack Dann and Gardner Dozois)
- "A Gun for Dinosaur" (L. Sprague de Camp)
- "Poor Little Warrior!" (Brian W. Aldiss)
- "Green Brother" (Howard Waldrop)
- "Hatching Season" (Harry Turtledove)
- "Getting Away" (Steven Utley)
- "The Runners" (Bob Buckley)
- "The Last Thunder Horse West of the Mississippi" (Sharon N. Farber)
- "Strata" (Edward Bryant)
- "Time's Arrow" (Arthur C. Clarke)
- "A Change in the Weather" (Gardner Dozois and Jack Dann)
- "The Night-blooming Saurian" (James Tiptree, Jr.)
- "Dinosaur" (Steve Rasnic Tem)
- "Dinosaurs" (Geoffrey A. Landis)
- "Dinosaur on a Bicycle" (Tim Sullivan)
