= Mermaids! =

1986 anthology edited by Jack Dann and Gardner Dozois

- Cover of first edition
- Author: edited by Jack Dann and Gardner Dozois
- Cover artist: Dawn Wilson
- Language: English
- Series: Jack Dann and Gardner Dozois Ace anthology series
- Genre: Fantasy
- Publisher: Ace Books
- Publication date: 1986
- Publication place: United States
- Media type: Print (paperback)
- Pages: 260
- ISBN: 0-441-52567-9
- Preceded by: Bestiary!
- Followed by: Sorcerers!

Mermaids! is a themed anthology of fantasy short works edited by American writers Jack Dann and Gardner Dozois. It was first published in paperback by Ace Books in January 1986. It was reissued as an ebook by Baen Books in July 2013.

The book collects seventeen novelettes and short stories by various science fiction authors, together with an introductory essay by Avram Davidson and a bibliography of further reading by the editors.

== Contents ==
- "The Prevalence of Mermaids" (Avram Davidson)
- "Nothing in the Rules" (L. Sprague de Camp)
- "She Sells Sea Shells" (Paul Darcy Boles)
- "The Soul Cages" (T. Crofton Croker)
- "Sweetly the Waves Call to Me" (Pat Murphy)
- "Driftglass" (Samuel R. Delany)
- "Mrs. Pigafetta Swims Well" (Reginald Bretnor)
- "The Nebraskan and the Nereid" (Gene Wolfe)
- "The Lady and the Merman" (Jane Yolen)
- "The White Seal Maid" (Jane Yolen)
- "The Fisherman's Wife" (Jane Yolen)
- "Till Human Voices Wake Us" (Lewis Shiner)
- "A Touch of Strange" (Theodore Sturgeon)
- "Something Rich and Strange" (Randall Garrett and Avram Davidson)
- "The Crest of Thirty-six" (Davis Grubb)
- "The Shannon Merrow" (Cooper McLaughlin)
- "Fish Story" (Leslie Charteris)
- "In the Islands" (Pat Murphy)
- "Recommended Reading List" (Jack Dann and Gardner Dozois)
