= Wizards (Ace anthology) =

2008 anthology edited by Jack Dann and Gardner Dozois

Dangerous Games
- Cover of first edition
- Editors: Jack Dann and Gardner Dozois
- Cover artist: John Jude Palencar
- Language: English
- Series: Jack Dann and Gardner Dozois Ace anthology series
- Genre: Fantasy
- Publisher: Berkley Books
- Publication date: 2007
- Publication place: United States
- Media type: Print (Hardcover)
- Pages: x, 400
- ISBN: 978-0-425-21518-0
- Preceded by: Dangerous Games

Wizards: Magical Tales from the Masters of Modern Fantasy is a fantasy anthology edited by American writers Jack Dann and Gardner Dozois. It was first published in hardcover by Berkley Books in 2008 and in paperback by Ace Books in 2008.

== Contents ==
The book has a short preface by the editors.

- "The Witch's Headstone" by Neil Gaiman
- "Holly and Iron" by Garth Nix
- "Color Vision" by Mary Rosenblum
- "The Ruby Incomparable" by Kage Baker
- "A Fowl Tale" by Eoin Colfer
- "Slipping Sideways Through Eternity" by Jane Yolen
- "The Stranger’s Hands" by Tad Williams
- "Naming Day" by Patricia A. McKillip
- "Winter’s Wife" by Elizabeth Hand
- "A Diorama of the Infernal Regions, or The Devil's Ninth Question" by Andy Duncan
- "Barrens Dance" by Peter S. Beagle
- "Stone Man" by Nancy Kress
- "The Manticore Spell" by Jeffrey Ford
- "Zinder" by Tanith Lee
- "Billy and the Wizard"' by Terry Bisson
- "The Magikkers" by Terry Dowling
- "The Magic Animal" by Gene Wolfe
- "Stonefather" by Orson Scott Card

== Recognition ==
The book was nominated for the 2008 World Fantasy Award and the 2008 Shirley Jackson Award for Best Anthology.
