= Seaserpents! =

1989 anthology edited by Jack Dann and Gardner Dozois

- Cover of first edition
- Editors: Jack Dann and Gardner Dozois
- Cover artist: Hiro Kimura
- Language: English
- Series: Jack Dann and Gardner Dozois Ace anthology series
- Genre: Fantasy
- Publisher: Ace Books
- Publication date: 1989
- Publication place: United States
- Media type: Print (paperback)
- Pages: xiii, 226 pp.
- ISBN: 0-441-75682-4
- Preceded by: Dogtales!
- Followed by: Dinosaurs!

Seaserpents! is a themed anthology of fantasy short works edited by Jack Dann and Gardner Dozois. It was first published in paperback by Ace Books in December 1989. It was reissued as an ebook by Baen Books in March 2013.

The book collects ten novellas, novelettes and short stories by various science fiction authors, together with a general introduction and a bibliography of further reading by the editors.

== Contents ==
- "Preface" (Jack Dann and Gardner Dozois)
- "Algy" (L. Sprague de Camp)
- "Out of Darkness" (Lillian Stewart Carl)
- "Leviathan!" (Larry Niven)
- "The Horses of Lir" (Roger Zelazny)
- "The Mortal and the Monster" (Gordon R. Dickson)
- "Man Overboard" (John Collier)
- "The Dakwa" (Manly Wade Wellman)
- "The Kings of the Sea" (Sterling E. Lanier)
- "Grumblefritz" (Marvin Kaye)
- "The Devil of Malkirk" (Charles Sheffield)
- "Further Reading" (Jack Dann and Gardner Dozois)
