= Nebula Awards 32 =

Anthology of science fiction short works

- Cover of first edition
- Editor: Jack Dann
- Cover artist: Claudine Guerguerian
- Language: English
- Series: Nebula Awards
- Genre: Science fiction
- Publisher: Harcourt Brace
- Publication date: 1998
- Publication place: United States
- Media type: Print (hardcover)
- Pages: x, 326
- ISBN: 0-15-100306-8
- OCLC: 38873209
- Dewey Decimal: 813.087608054
- LC Class: PS648.S3 N38 1998
- Preceded by: Nebula Awards 31
- Followed by: Nebula Awards 33

Nebula Awards 32 is an anthology of science fiction short works edited by Jack Dann. It was first published in hardcover and trade paperback by Harcourt Brace in April 1998.

== Summary ==
The book collects pieces that won or were nominated for the Nebula Awards for novella, novelette and short story for the year 1997, a profile of 1997 Grand Master award winner Jack Vance with a representative early story by him, and various other nonfiction pieces related to the awards, together with the Rhysling Award-winning poems for 1996 and an introduction by the editor. Not all nominees for the various awards are included, and one of the novella nominees included was actually for the 1996 award.

== Contents ==
- "Introduction" (Jack Dann)
- "Keeping Up" [essay] (Elizabeth Hand)
- "Must Have Been Something I Ate" [essay] (Lucius Shepard)
- "Interactive Science Fiction: 1996" [essay] (Keith Ferrell)
- "The British Scene" [essay] (Ian Watson)
- "The Road to 1996" [essay] (Sean McMullen and Terry Dowling)
- "Who Is Killing Science Fiction?" [essay] (Norman Spinrad)
- "Abandoned Cities" [essay] (Robert Frazier)
- "Must and Shall" [Best Novelette nominee, 1997] (Harry Turtledove)
- "In the Shade of the Slowboat Man" [Best Short Story nominee, 1997] (Dean Wesley Smith)
- "Da Vinci Rising" [Best Novella winner, 1997] (Jack Dann)
- "Variants of the Obsolete" [Rhysling Award - Best Long Poem winner, 1996] (Margaret Ballif Simon)
- "Future Present: A Lesson in Expectation" [Rhysling Award - Best Short Poem winner, 1996] (Bruce Boston)
- "A Birthday" [Best Short Story winner, 1997] (Esther M. Friesner)
- "The Chronology Protection Case" [Best Novelette nominee, 1997] (Paul Levinson)
- "Jack Vance: Grand Master of Science Fiction and Fantasy" [essay] (Robert Silverberg)
- "My Friend Jack" [essay] (Terry Dowling)
- "The Men Return' [short story] (Jack Vance)
- "Yaguara" [Best Novella nominee, 1996] (Nicola Griffith)
- "Science Fiction Films of 1996" [essay] (Bill Warren)
- "Five Fucks" [Best Short Story nominee, 1997] (Jonathan Lethem)
- "Lifeboat on a Burning Sea" [Best Novelette winner, 1997] (Bruce Holland Rogers)
- "Selected Titles from the 1996 Preliminary Nebula Ballot" (uncredited)
- "Past Nebula Award Winners" (uncredited)
- "About the Science-Fiction and Fantasy Writers of America" (uncredited)

== Reception ==
Kirkus Reviews calls the anthology one to "read [and] enjoy. Just don't mention 'franchising' if Norman Spinrad's within earshot." (His piece "gets hissy about authors who rent out their creations.") The fictional offerings are briefly noted, with most comment reserved for the essays; Warren "heroically watched all the year's movies," Shepard "gloomily records the death of literary science fiction," and Hand "growls that fiction itself has become 'a barrio of the entertainment industry.'"

The collection was also reviewed by Faren Miller and Gary K. Wolfe in Locus no. 447, April 1998, Brian Stableford in The New York Review of Science Fiction, July 1998, and David A. Truesdale in SF Site, June 1998.

== Awards ==
The anthology placed ninth in the 1999 Locus Poll Award for Best Anthology.
