= Gardner Dozois =

American science fiction author and editor (1947–2018)

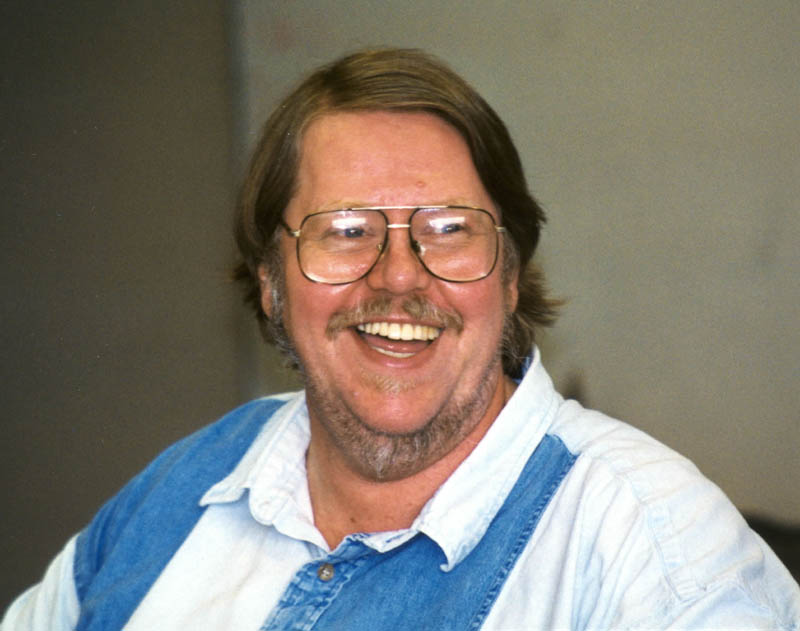
- Dozois at Clarion West Writers Workshop, Seattle, 1998
- Born: Gardner Raymond Dozois; July 23, 1947; Salem, Massachusetts, U.S.
- Died: May 27, 2018 (aged 70); Philadelphia, Pennsylvania, U.S.
- Occupations: Editor, writer
- Spouse: Susan Casper (m. c. 1970 – 2017, her death)
- Writing career
- Period: 1970–2018
- Genres: Science fiction magazines, anthologies, short fiction
- Notable work: Asimov's Science Fiction

Gardner Raymond Dozois ( /doʊˈzwɑː/ doh-ZWAH; July 23, 1947 – May 27, 2018) was an American science fiction author and editor. He was the founding editor of The Year's Best Science Fiction anthologies (1984–2018) and was editor of Asimov's Science Fiction (1986–2004), garnering multiple Hugo and Locus Awards for those works almost every year. He also won the Nebula Award for Best Short Story twice. He was inducted to the Science Fiction Hall of Fame on June 25, 2011.

== Biography ==
Dozois was born July 23, 1947, in Salem, Massachusetts. He graduated from Salem High School with the Class of 1965. From 1966 to 1969 he served in the Army as a journalist, after which he moved to New York City to work as an editor in the science fiction field. One of his stories had been published by Frederik Pohl in the September 1966 issue of If but his next four appeared in 1970, three in Damon Knight's anthology series Orbit.

Dozois said that he turned to reading fiction partially as an escape from the provincialism of his home town.

He was badly injured in a taxi accident after returning from a Philadelphia Phillies game in 2004 (causing him to miss Worldcon for the first time in many years) but made a full recovery. On July 6, 2007, Dozois had surgery for a planned quintuple bypass operation. A week later, he experienced complications which prompted additional surgery to implant a defibrillator.

Dozois died on May 27, 2018, of a systemic infection at a hospital in Philadelphia at the age of 70.

== Fiction ==
As a writer, Dozois mainly worked in shorter forms. He won the Nebula Award for Best Short Story twice: once for "The Peacemaker" in 1983, and again for "Morning Child" in 1984. His short fiction has been collected in The Visible Man (1977), Geodesic Dreams (a best-of collection), Slow Dancing through Time (1990, collaborations), Strange Days (2001, another best-of collection), Morning Child and Other Stories (2004) and When the Great Days Come (2011). As a novelist, Dozois's oeuvre is significantly smaller. He was the author of one solo novel, Strangers (1978), as well as a collaboration with George Alec Effinger, Nightmare Blue (1977), and a collaboration with George R. R. Martin and Daniel Abraham for Hunter's Run (2008). After he became editor of Asimov's, Dozois's fiction output dwindled. His 2006 novelette "Counterfactual" won the Sidewise Award for Alternate History. Dozois also wrote short fiction reviews for Locus.

Michael Swanwick, one of his co-authors, completed a long interview with Dozois covering every published piece of his fiction. Being Gardner Dozois: An Interview by Michael Swanwick was published by Old Earth Books in 2001. It won the Locus Award for Non-Fiction and was a finalist for the Hugo Award for Best Related Work.

== Editorial work ==
Dozois was known primarily as an editor, winning the Hugo Award for Best Professional Editor 15 times in 17 years from 1988 to his retirement from Asimov's in 2004. George R. R. Martin described him as the most important and influential editor in science fiction since John W. Campbell. In addition to his work with Asimov's (of which he was the first associate editor in 1976), he also worked in the 1970s with magazines such as Galaxy Science Fiction, If, Worlds of Fantasy, and Worlds of Tomorrow.

Dozois was also a prolific short fiction anthologist. After resigning from his Asimov's position, he remained the editor of the anthology series The Year's Best Science Fiction, published annually since 1984. In three decades Locus readers have voted it the year's best anthology almost 20 times and the runner-up almost 10 times. And, with Jack Dann, he edited a long series of themed anthologies, each with a self-explanatory title such as Cats, Dinosaurs, Seaserpents, or Hackers.

Stories selected by Gardner Dozois for the annual best-of-year volumes have won, as of December 2015, 44 Hugos, 41 Nebulas, 32 Locus, 10 World Fantasy and 18 Sturgeon Awards. That also includes the Dutton series (Dozois volumes only).

Dozois consistently expressed a particular interest in adventure SF and space opera, which he collectively referred to as "center-core SF".

== Works ==
=== Fiction ===
==== Novels ====
- Nightmare Blue (with George Alec Effinger) (1975, ISBN 978-0-425-02819-3)
- Strangers (1978, ISBN 978-0-399-12095-4)
- Hunter's Run (2008, ISBN 978-0-06-137329-9) (with George R. R. Martin and Daniel Abraham)
- City Under the Stars (2020, ISBN 978-1250756589) (with Michael Swanwick)

==== Collections ====
- The Visible Man (1977, ISBN 978-0-425-03595-5)
- Slow Dancing Through Time (1990, ISBN 978-0942681031)
- Geodesic Dreams (1992, ISBN 978-0-312-08197-3)
- Strange Days: Fabulous Journeys with Gardner Dozois (2001, ISBN 978-1-886778-26-9)
- Morning Child and Other Stories (2004, ISBN 978-0-7434-9318-5)
- When the Great Days Come (2011, ISBN 978-1-60701-278-8)

==== Short stories ====
- The Empty Man (1966)
- The Sound of Muzak (1970)
- A Special Kind of Morning (1971)
- Wires (1971)
- Conditioned Reflex (1972)
- King Harvest (1972)
- Flying (1973)
- In A Crooked Year (1973)
- The Sacrifice (1982)
- Virgin Territory (1984)
- The City of God (1995) (with Michael Swanwick)
- Sunk Beneath the Waves (2013)
- The Place of Bones (2016)
- A Dog's Story (2017)
- Unstoppable (2018)
- Homecoming (2019)

==== Anthologies ====
Edited by Gardner Dozois

- A Day in the Life (1972, ISBN 978-0-06-011076-5)
- Another World: Adventures in Otherness (1977, ISBN 978-0-695-40695-0)
- Modern Classics of Science Fiction (1992, ISBN 978-0-312-07238-4)
- Modern Classic Short Novels of Science Fiction (1994, ISBN 978-0-312-10504-4)
- Mammoth Book of Contemporary SF Masters (1994, ISBN 978-1-85487-297-5)
- Killing Me Softly (1995, ASIN B000OEN80G)
- Dying for It (1997, ASIN B000H40WZC)
- Modern Classics of Fantasy (1997, ISBN 978-0-312-16931-2)
- The Good Old Stuff: Adventure SF in the Grand Tradition (1998, ISBN 978-0-312-19275-4)
- The Good New Stuff: Adventure SF in the Grand Tradition (1999, ISBN 978-0-312-19890-9)
- Explorers: SF Adventures to Far Horizons (2000, ISBN 978-0-312-25462-9)
- The Furthest Horizon: SF Adventures to the Far Future (2000, ISBN 978-0-312-26326-3)
- Worldmakers: SF Adventures in Terraforming (2001, ISBN 978-0-312-27570-9)
- Supermen: Tales of the Posthuman Future (2002, ISBN 978-0-312-27569-3)
- Galileo's Children: Tales of Science vs. Superstition (2005, ISBN 978-1-59102-315-9)
- One Million A.D. (2005, ISBN 0-7394-6273-3)
- Nebula Awards Showcase 2006 (2006, ISBN 978-0-451-46064-6)
- Galactic Empires (2007)
- The Mammoth Book of the Best Short SF Novels (2009)
- The Book of Silverberg: Stories in Honor of Robert Silverberg (2014) (with William Schafer)
- The Book of Swords (2017)
- The Book of Magic (2018)

co-edited by Dozois and Susan Casper

- Ripper (1988, ISBN 978-0-8125-1700-2) (co-edited with Susan Casper)

co-edited by Dozois and Mike Resnick

- Future Earths: Under African Skies (1993, ISBN 978-0-88677-544-5) (co-edited with Mike Resnick)
- Future Earths: Under South American Skies (1993, ISBN 978-0-88677-581-0) (co-edited with Mike Resnick)

co-edited by Dozois and Stanley Schmidt

- Roads Not Taken: Tales of Alternate History (1998, ISBN 978-0-345-42194-4) (co-edited with Stanley Schmidt)

co-edited by Dozois and Jonathan Strahan

- The New Space Opera (2007, ISBN 978-0-06-084675-6) (co-edited with Jonathan Strahan)
- The New Space Opera 2 (2009, ISBN 978-0-06-156235-8) (co-edited with Jonathan Strahan)

co-edited by Dozois and Greg Bear

- Multiverse: Exploring Poul Anderson's Worlds (2014) (co-edited with Greg Bear)

Cross-genre anthologies co-edited by Dozois and George R. R. Martin

- Songs of the Dying Earth, a tribute anthology to Jack Vance's seminal Dying Earth series, published by Subterranean Press (2009)
- Warriors, a cross-genre anthology featuring stories about war and warriors (2010)
- Songs of Love and Death, a cross-genre anthology featuring stories of romance in fantasy and science fiction settings (2010)
- Down These Strange Streets, a cross-genre anthology featuring stories of private-eye detectives in fantasy and science fiction settings (November 2011)
- Old Mars, an anthology featuring new stories about Mars in retro-SF vein (2013)
- Dangerous Women, a cross-genre anthology featuring stories about women warriors (2013)
- Rogues, a cross-genre anthology featuring stories about assorted rogues (2014)
- Old Venus, an anthology featuring new stories about Venus in retro-SF vein (2015)

Themed anthology series co-edited by Dozois and Jack Dann

Formerly known as "Magic Tales Anthology Series" until 1995; most released under the Ace imprint.

- Future Power (1976, ASIN B000H75MWC) (co-edited with Jack Dann)
- Aliens! (April 1980, Pocket Books, ISBN 0-671-83155-0)
- Unicorns! (May 1982, ISBN 978-0-441-85441-7)
- Magicats! (June 1984, ISBN 978-0-441-51532-5)
- Bestiary! (October 1985, ISBN 978-0-441-05508-1)
- Mermaids! (January 1986, ISBN 978-0-441-52567-6)
- Sorcerers! (October 1986, ISBN 978-0-441-77532-3)
- Demons! (July 1987, ISBN 978-0-441-14264-4)
- Dogtales! (September 1988, ISBN 978-0-441-15760-0)
- Seaserpents! (December 1989, ISBN 978-0-441-75682-7)
- Dinosaurs! (June 1990, ISBN 978-0-441-14883-7)
- Little People! (March 1991, ISBN 978-0-441-50391-9)
- Magicats II (December 1991, ISBN 978-0-441-51533-2)
- Unicorns II (November 1992, ISBN 978-0-441-84564-4)
- Dragons! (August 1993, ISBN 978-0-441-16631-2)
- Invaders! (December 1993, ISBN 978-0-441-01519-1)
- Horses! (May 1994, ISBN 978-0-441-00057-9)
- Angels! (June 1995, ISBN 978-0-441-00220-7)
- Dinosaurs II (December 1995, ISBN 978-0-441-00285-6)
- Hackers (October 1996, ISBN 978-0-441-00375-4)
- Timegates (March 1997, ISBN 978-0-441-00428-7)
- Clones (April 1998, ISBN 978-0-441-00522-2)
- Immortals (July 1998, ISBN 978-0-441-00539-0)
- Nanotech (December 1998, ISBN 978-0-441-00585-7)
- Future War (August 1999, ISBN 978-0-441-00639-7)
- Armageddons (November 1999, ISBN 978-0-441-00675-5)
- Aliens Among Us (June 2000, ISBN 978-0-441-00704-2)
- Genometry (January 2001, ISBN 978-0-441-00797-4)
- Space Soldiers (April 2001, ISBN 978-0-441-00824-7)
- Future Sports (June 2002, ISBN 978-0-441-00961-9)
- Beyond Flesh (December 2002, ISBN 978-0-441-00999-2)
- Future Crimes (December 2003, ISBN 978-0-441-01118-6)
- A.I.s (December 2004, ISBN 978-0-441-01216-9)
- Robots (August 2005, ISBN 978-0-441-01321-0)
- Beyond Singularity (December 2005, ISBN 978-0-441-01363-0)
- Escape from Earth (August 2006, Science Fiction Book Club, ISBN 978-1-58288-225-3)
- Futures Past (November 2006, ISBN 978-0-441-01454-5)
- Dangerous Games (April 2007, ISBN 978-0-441-01490-3)
- Wizards (May 2007, ISBN 978-1-101-20874-8)
- The Dragon Book (November 2009, ISBN 978-1-101-15126-6)

"Isaac Asimov's" anthology series

- Transcendental Tales from Isaac Asimov's Science Fiction Magazine (1989, ISBN 978-0-89865-762-3)
- Time Travelers from Isaac Asimov's Science Fiction Magazine (1989, ISBN 978-0-441-80935-6)
- Isaac Asimov's Robots (1991, ISBN 978-0-441-37376-5) (co-edited with Sheila Williams)
- Isaac Asimov's Aliens (1991, ISBN 978-0-441-01672-3)
- Isaac Asimov's Mars (1991, ISBN 978-0-441-37375-8)
- Isaac Asimov's Earth (1992, ISBN 978-0-441-37377-2) (co-edited with Sheila Williams)
- Isaac Asimov's War (1993, ISBN 978-0-441-37393-2)
- Isaac Asimov's SF Lite (1993, ISBN 978-0-441-37389-5)
- Isaac Asimov's Cyberdreams (1994, ISBN 978-0-441-00073-9)
- Isaac Asimov's Skin Deep (1995, ISBN 978-0-441-00190-3) (co-edited with Sheila Williams)
- Isaac Asimov's Ghosts (1995, ISBN 978-0-441-00254-2) (co-edited with Sheila Williams)
- Isaac Asimov's Vampires (1996, ISBN 978-0-441-00387-7) (co-edited with Sheila Williams)
- Isaac Asimov's Moons (1997, ISBN 978-0-441-00453-9) (co-edited with Sheila Williams)
- Isaac Asimov's Christmas (1997, ISBN 978-0-441-00491-1) (co-edited with Sheila Williams)
- Isaac Asimov's Detectives (1998, ISBN 978-0-441-00545-1) (co-edited with Sheila Williams)
- Isaac Asimov's Camelot (1998, ISBN 978-0-441-00527-7) (co-edited with Sheila Williams)
- Isaac Asimov's Solar System (1999, ISBN 978-0-441-00698-4) (co-edited with Sheila Williams)
- Isaac Asimov's Werewolves (1999, ISBN 978-0-441-00661-8) (co-edited with Sheila Williams)
- Isaac Asimov's Valentines (1999, ISBN 978-0-441-00602-1) (co-edited with Sheila Williams)
- Isaac Asimov's Halloween (1999, ISBN 978-0-441-00854-4) (co-edited with Sheila Williams)
- Isaac Asimov's Utopias (2000, ISBN 978-0-441-00784-4) (co-edited with Sheila Williams)
- Isaac Asimov's Mother's Day (2000, ISBN 978-0-441-00721-9) (co-edited with Sheila Williams)
- Isaac Asimov's Father's Day (2001, ISBN 978-0-441-00874-2) (co-edited with Sheila Williams)

The Year's Best Science Fiction series

- The Year's Best Science Fiction: First Annual Collection (1984)
- The Year's Best Science Fiction: Second Annual Collection (1985)
- The Year's Best Science Fiction: Third Annual Collection (1986)
- The Year's Best Science Fiction: Fourth Annual Collection (1987)
- The Year's Best Science Fiction: Fifth Annual Collection (1988) The Best New Science Fiction (UK)
- The Year's Best Science Fiction: Sixth Annual Collection (1989) Best New SF#02 (UK)
- The Year's Best Science Fiction: Seventh Annual Collection (1990) Best New SF#03 (UK)
- The Year's Best Science Fiction: Eighth Annual Collection (1991) Best New SF#04 (UK)
- The Year's Best Science Fiction: Ninth Annual Collection (1992) Best New SF#05 (UK)
- The Year's Best Science Fiction: Tenth Annual Collection (1993) Best New SF#06 (UK)
- The Year's Best Science Fiction: Eleventh Annual Collection (1994) Best New SF#07 (UK)
- The Year's Best Science Fiction: Twelfth Annual Collection (1995) Best New Science Fiction#08 (UK)
- The Year's Best Science Fiction: Thirteenth Annual Collection (1996) Best New SF#09 (UK)
- The Year's Best Science Fiction: Fourteenth Annual Collection (1997) Best New Science Fiction#10 (UK)
- The Year's Best Science Fiction: Fifteenth Annual Collection (1998) The Mammoth Book Of Best New Science Fiction#11 (UK)
- The Year's Best Science Fiction: Sixteenth Annual Collection (1999) The Mammoth Book Of Best New Science Fiction#12 (UK)
- The Year's Best Science Fiction: Seventeenth Annual Collection (2000) The Mammoth Book Of Best New Science Fiction#13 (UK)
- The Year's Best Science Fiction: Eighteenth Annual Collection (2001) The Mammoth Book Of Best New Science Fiction#14 (UK)
- The Year's Best Science Fiction: Nineteenth Annual Collection (2002) The Mammoth Book Of Best New Science Fiction#15 (UK)
- The Year's Best Science Fiction: Twentieth Annual Collection (2003) The Mammoth Book Of Best New Science Fiction#16 (UK)
- The Year's Best Science Fiction: Twenty-First Annual Collection (2004) The Mammoth Book Of Best New Science Fiction#17 (UK)
- The Year's Best Science Fiction: Twenty-Second Annual Collection (2005) The Mammoth Book Of Best New Science Fiction#18 (UK)
- The Year's Best Science Fiction: Twenty-Third Annual Collection (2006) The Mammoth Book Of Best New Science Fiction#19 (UK)
- The Year's Best Science Fiction: Twenty-Fourth Annual Collection (2007) The Mammoth Book Of Best New Science Fiction#20 (UK)
- The Year's Best Science Fiction: Twenty-Fifth Annual Collection (2008) The Mammoth Book Of Best New Science Fiction#21 (UK)
- The Year's Best Science Fiction: Twenty-Sixth Annual Collection (2009) The Mammoth Book Of Best New Science Fiction#22 (UK)
- The Year's Best Science Fiction: Twenty-Seventh Annual Collection (2010) The Mammoth Book Of Best New Science Fiction#23 (UK)
- The Year's Best Science Fiction: Twenty-Eighth Annual Collection (2011) The Mammoth Book Of Best New Science Fiction#24 (UK)
- The Year's Best Science Fiction: Twenty-Ninth Annual Collection (2012) The Mammoth Book Of Best New Science Fiction#25 (UK)
- The Year's Best Science Fiction: Thirtieth Annual Collection (2013) The Mammoth Book Of Best New Science Fiction#26 (UK)
- The Year's Best Science Fiction: Thirty-First Annual Collection (2014) The Mammoth Book Of Best New Science Fiction#27 (UK)
- The Year's Best Science Fiction: Thirty-Second Annual Collection (2015) The Mammoth Book Of Best New Science Fiction#28 (UK)
- The Year's Best Science Fiction: Thirty-Third Annual Collection (2016) The Mammoth Book Of Best New Science Fiction#29 (UK)
- The Year's Best Science Fiction: Thirty-Fourth Annual Collection (2017)
- The Year's Best Science Fiction: Thirty-Fifth Annual Collection (2018)
- Best of the Best: 20 Years of the Year's Best Science Fiction (2005) (Anthology from previous Year's Best Science Fiction editions)
- Best of the Best Volume 2: 20 Years of the Year's Best Short Science Fiction Novels (2007) (Anthology from previous Year's Best Science Fiction editions)

Dozois also edited volumes six through ten of the Best Science Fiction Stories of the Year series after Lester del Rey edited the first five volumes. That series began in 1972 and ended in 1981.

=== Non-Fiction ===
- The Fiction of James Tiptree, Jr. (1977, ISBN 978-0-916186-04-3)
- Writing Science Fiction & Fantasy (1993, ISBN 978-0-312-08926-9) (co-edited with Stanley Schmidt and Sheila Williams)
- Sense of Wonder: Short Fiction Reviews (2009-2017) (2018)

== Awards ==
Awards for Gardner Dozois
| Work | Year & Award | Category | Result | Ref. |
|---|---|---|---|---|
| A Dream at Noonday | 1971 Nebula Award | Short Story | Nominated | |
| A Special Kind of Morning | 1972 Locus Award | Short Fiction | Nominated | |
| A Special Kind of Morning | 1972 Hugo Award | Novella | Nominated | |
| A Special Kind of Morning | 1972 Nebula Award | Novelette | Nominated | |
| Horse of Air | 1972 Nebula Award | Short Story | Nominated | |
| A Kingdom by the Sea | 1973 Locus Award | Short Fiction | Nominated | |
| A Kingdom by the Sea | 1973 Hugo Award | Novelette | Finalist | |
| A Kingdom by the Sea | 1973 Nebula Award | Novelette | Nominated | |
| Chains of the Sea | 1974 Hugo Award | Novella | Finalist | |
| Chains of the Sea | 1974 Locus Award | Novella | Nominated | |
| Chains of the Sea | 1974 Nebula Award | Novella | Nominated | |
| Strangers (Novella) | 1975 Locus Award | Novella | Nominated | |
| Strangers (Novella) | 1975 Hugo Award | Novella | Finalist | |
| Strangers (Novel) | 1979 Locus Award | SF Novel | Nominated | |
| Strangers (Novel) | 1979 Nebula Award | Novel | Nominated | |
| Future Power (with Jack Dann) | 1977 Locus Award | Anthology | Nominated | |
| Immortals (with Jack Dann) | 1979 Locus Award | Anthology | Nominated | |
| Best Science Fiction Stories of the Year (8th Annual Collection) | 1980 Locus Award | Anthology | Nominated | |
| Best Science Fiction Stories of the Year (9th Annual Collection) | 1981 Locus Award | Anthology | Nominated | |
| Best Science Fiction Stories of the Year (10th Annual Collection) | 1982 Locus Award | Anthology | Nominated | |
| Disciples | 1982 Locus Award | Short Story | Nominated | |
| Disciples | 1982 Nebula Award | Short Story | Nominated | |
| Executive Clemency | 1982 Locus Award | Short Story | Nominated | |
| The Peacemaker | 1984 Hugo Award | Short Story | Nominated | |
| The Peacemaker | 1984 Locus Award | Short Story | Nominated | |
| The Peacemaker | 1984 SF Chronicle Award | Short Story | Won | |
| The Peacemaker | 1984 Nebula Award | Short Story | Won | |
| Dinner Party | 1985 Locus Award | Short Story | Nominated | |
| The Year's Best Science Fiction (1st Annual Collection) | 1985 Locus Award | Anthology | Nominated | |
| Morning Child | 1985 Locus Award | Short Story | Nominated | |
| Morning Child | 1985 SF Chronicle Award | Short Story | Nominated | |
| Morning Child | 1985 Nebula Award | Short Story | Won | |
| Morning Child and Other Stories | 2005 Locus Award | Collection | Nominated | |
| Bestiary! (with Jack Dann) | 1986 Locus Award | Anthology | Nominated | |
| The Year's Best Science Fiction (2nd Annual Collection) | 1986 Locus Award | Anthology | Nominated | |
| The Gods of Mars (with Jack Dann & Michael Swanwick) | 1986 Locus Award | Short Story | Nominated | |
| The Gods of Mars (with Jack Dann & Michael Swanwick) | 1986 Nebula Award | Short Story | Nominated | |
| The Year's Best Science Fiction (3rd Annual Collection) | 1987 Locus Award | Anthology | Won | |
| Asimov's Science Fiction & The Year's Best Science Fiction (3rd Annual Collection) | 1987 Hugo Award | Professional Editor | Nominated | |
| The Year's Best Science Fiction (4th Annual Collection) | 1988 Locus Award | Anthology | Won | |
| Asimov's Science Fiction | 1987 SF Chronicle Award | Pro Editor - Magazines | Won | |
| Asimov's Science Fiction | 1988 World Fantasy Special Award—Professional | | Nominated | |
| Asimov's Science Fiction | 1988 SF Chronicle Award | Pro Editor - Magazines | Won | |
| Asimov's Science Fiction | 1990 SF Chronicle Award | Pro Editor - Magazines | Won | |
| Asimov's Science Fiction | 1992 SF Chronicle Award | Pro Editor - Magazines | Won | |
| Asimov's Science Fiction | 1993 SF Chronicle Award | Pro Editor - Magazines | Won | |
| Asimov's Science Fiction | 1994 SF Chronicle Award | Pro Editor - Magazines | Won | |
| Asimov's Science Fiction | 1995 SF Chronicle Award | Pro Editor - Magazines | Won | |
| Asimov's Science Fiction | 1997 SF Chronicle Award | Pro Editor - Magazines | Won | |
| Asimov's Science Fiction & The Year's Best Science Fiction (4th Annual Collection) | 1988 Hugo Award | Professional Editor | Won | |
| The Year's Best Science Fiction (5th Annual Collection) | 1989 Locus Award | Anthology | Nominated | |
| Asimov's Science Fiction & The Year's Best Science Fiction (5th Annual Collection) | 1989 Hugo Award | Professional Editor | Won | |
| Solace | 1990 Locus Award | Short Story | Nominated | |
| Asimov's Science Fiction & The Year's Best Science Fiction (6th Annual Collection) | 1990 Hugo Award | Professional Editor | Won | |
| The Year's Best Science Fiction (6th Annual Collection) | 1990 Locus Award | Anthology | Nominated | |
| Après Moi | 1991 Locus Award | Short Story | Nominated | |
| Asimov's Science Fiction & The Year's Best Science Fiction (7th Annual Collection) | 1991 Hugo Award | Professional Editor | Won | |
| The Year's Best Science Fiction (8th Annual Collection) | 1992 Locus Award | Anthology | Won | |
| Slow Dancing Through Time | 1991 Locus Award | Collection | Nominated | |
| Slow Dancing Through Time | 1991 Readercon Awards | Value in Bookcraft | Won | |
| The Year's Best Science Fiction (8th Annual Collection) | 1992 Locus Award | Anthology | Nominated | |
| Geodesic Dreams | 1993 Locus Award | Collection | Nominated | |
| The Year's Best Science Fiction (9th Annual Collection) | 1993 Locus Award | Anthology | Won | |
| The Year's Best Science Fiction (10th Annual Collection) | 1994 Locus Award | Anthology | Won | |
| Modern Classic Short Novels of Science Fiction | 1995 Locus Award | Anthology | Nominated | |
| The Year's Best Science Fiction (11th Annual Collection) | 1995 Locus Award | Anthology | Won | |
| Killing Me Softly: Erotic Tales of Unearthly Love | 1996 Locus Award | Anthology | Nominated | |
| The Year's Best Science Fiction (12th Annual Collection) | 1996 Locus Award | Anthology | Won | |
| The City of God (with Michael Swanwick) | 1996 Locus Award | Novella | Nominated | |
| The City of God (with Michael Swanwick) | 1997 Asimov's Readers' Poll | Novella | 6th Place | |
| Community | 1997 Locus Award | Short Story | Nominated | |
| Community | 1997 Asimov's Readers' Poll | Short Story | 9th Place | |
| The Year's Best Science Fiction (13th Annual Collection) | 1997 Locus Award | Anthology | Won | |
| Dying For It: More Erotic Tales of Unearthly Love | 1998 Locus Award | Anthology | Nominated | |
| The Year's Best Science Fiction (14th Annual Collection) | 1998 Locus Award | Anthology | Won | |
| Modern Classics of Fantasy | 1998 Locus Award | Anthology | Nominated | |
| Modern Classics of Fantasy | 1998 World Fantasy Award | Anthology | Nominated | |
| | 1998 World Fantasy Special Award—Professional | for anthologies & editing | Nominated | |
| Ancestral Voices (with Michael Swanwick) | 1999 Asimov's Readers' Poll | Novella | 4th Place | |
| Ancestral Voices (with Michael Swanwick) | 1999 Locus Award | Novella | Nominated | |
| Nanotech (with Jack Dann) | 1999 Locus Award | Anthology | Nominated | |
| The Good Old Stuff: Adventure SF in the Grand Tradition | 1999 Locus Award | Anthology | Nominated | |
| The Year's Best Science Fiction (15th Annual Collection) | 1999 Locus Award | Anthology | Nominated | |
| A Knight of Ghosts and Shadows | 2000 Asimov's Readers' Poll | Novelette | 2nd Place | |
| A Knight of Ghosts and Shadows | 2000 Locus Award | Novelette | Nominated | |
| A Knight of Ghosts and Shadows | 2001 Nebula Award | Novelette | Nominated | |
| The Year's Best Science Fiction (16th Annual Collection) | 2000 Locus Award | Anthology | Nominated | |
| The Good New Stuff: Adventure SF in the Grand Tradition | 2000 Locus Award | Anthology | Nominated | |
| The Year's Best Science Fiction (17th Annual Collection) | 2001 Locus Award | Anthology | Won | |
| Explorers: SF Adventures to Far Horizons | 2001 Locus Award | Anthology | Nominated | |
| The Furthest Horizon: SF Adventures to the Far Future | 2001 Locus Award | Anthology | Nominated | |
| Strange Days: Fabulous Journeys with Gardner Dozois | 2002 Locus Award | Collection | Nominated | |
| Supermen: Tales of the Posthuman Future | 2002 Locus Award | Anthology | Nominated | |
| Worldmakers: SF Adventures in Terraforming | 2002 Locus Award | Anthology | Nominated | |
| The Year's Best Science Fiction (18th Annual Collection) | 2002 Locus Award | Anthology | Won | |
| The Year's Best Science Fiction (19th Annual Collection) | 2003 Locus Award | Anthology | Won | |
| The Hanging Curve | 2003 Locus Award | Short Story | Nominated | |
| The Year's Best Science Fiction (20th Annual Collection) | 2004 Locus Award | Anthology | Won | |
| Fairy Tale | 2004 Locus Award | Short Story | Nominated | |
| Asimov's Science Fiction & The Year's Best Science Fiction (20th Annual Collection) | 2004 Hugo Award | Professional Editor | Won | |
| Asimov's Science Fiction & The Year's Best Science Fiction (21st Annual Collection) | 2005 Hugo Award | Professional Editor | Nominated | |
| The Year's Best Science Fiction (21st Annual Collection) | 2005 Locus Award | Anthology | Won | |
| Shadow Twin (with Daniel Abraham & George R. R. Martin) | 2005 Locus Award | Novella | Nominated | |
| Shadow Twin (with Daniel Abraham & George R. R. Martin) | 2006 Asimov's Readers' Poll | Novella | 4th Place | |
| Galileo's Children: Tales of Science vs. Superstition | 2006 Locus Award | Anthology | Nominated | |
| The Best of the Best: 20 Years of the Year's Best Science Fiction | 2006 Locus Award | Anthology | Nominated | |
| The Year's Best Science Fiction (22nd Annual Collection) | 2006 Locus Award | Anthology | Nominated | |
| Counterfactual | 2006 Sidewise Award for Alternate History | Short Form | Won | |
| Counterfactual | 2007 Locus Award | Novelette | Nominated | |
| Escape from Earth: New Adventures in Space (with Jack Dann) | 2007 Locus Award | Anthology | Nominated | |
| Futures Past (with Jack Dann) | 2007 Locus Award | Anthology | Nominated | |
| Nebula Awards Showcase 2006 | 2007 Locus Award | Anthology | Nominated | |
| The Year's Best Science Fiction (23rd Annual Collection) | 2007 Locus Award | Anthology | Won | |
| The Year's Best Science Fiction (23rd Annual Collection) | 2007 Hugo Award | Professional Editor (Short Form) | Nominated | |
| One Million A.D. | 2007 Locus Award | Anthology | Nominated | |
| Wizards: Magical Tales from the Masters of Modern Fantasy | 2008 Shirley Jackson Award | Anthology | Nominated | |
| Wizards: Magical Tales from the Masters of Modern Fantasy | 2008 World Fantasy Award | Anthology | Nominated | |
| The Best of the Best Volume 2: 20 Years of the Best Short Science Fiction Novels | 2008 Locus Award | Anthology | Nominated | |
| The Year's Best Science Fiction (24th Annual Collection) | 2008 Locus Award | Anthology | Nominated | |
| The New Space Opera (with Jonathan Strahan) | 2008 Ditmar Award | Collected Work | Won | |
| Galactic Empires | 2009 Locus Award | Anthology | Nominated | |
| The New Space Opera 2 (with Jonathan Strahan) | 2009 Aurealis Award | Anthology | Finalist | |
| The New Space Opera 2 (with Jonathan Strahan) | 2010 Locus Award | Anthology | Won | |
| The New Space Opera 2 (with Jonathan Strahan) | 2010 Ditmar Award | Collected Work | Finalist | |
| The Year's Best Science Fiction (25th Annual Collection) | 2010 FantLab's Book of the Year Award | Anthology | Won | |
| The Year's Best Science Fiction (25th Annual Collection) | 2009 Locus Award | Anthology | Won | |
| Songs of the Dying Earth: Stories in Honor of Jack Vance | 2010 Locus Award | Anthology | Nominated | |
| Songs of the Dying Earth: Stories in Honor of Jack Vance | 2010 World Fantasy Award | Anthology | Nominated | |
| Songs of the Dying Earth: Stories in Honor of Jack Vance | 2010 British Fantasy Award | Anthology | Nominated | |
| Songs of the Dying Earth: Stories in Honor of Jack Vance | 2014 FantLab's Book of the Year Award | Anthology | Nominated | |
| The Dragon Book | 2010 Locus Award | Anthology | Nominated | |
| Warriors | 2011 Locus Award | Anthology | Won | |
| The Year's Best Science Fiction (27th Annual Collection) | 2011 Locus Award | Anthology | Nominated | |
| Hunter's Run (with Daniel Abraham & George R. R. Martin) | 2011 Seiun Award | Translated Long Work | Nominated | |
| When the Great Days Come | 2012 Locus Award | Collection | Nominated | |
| The Year's Best Science Fiction (28th Annual Collection) | 2012 Locus Award | Anthology | Won | |
| Rip-Off! | 2013 Locus Award | Anthology | Nominated | |
| The Year's Best Science Fiction (29th Annual Collection) | 2013 Locus Award | Anthology | Nominated | |
| Old Mars (with George R. R. Martin) | 2014 Locus Award | Anthology | Won | |
| Dangerous Women (with George R. R. Martin) | 2014 World Fantasy Award | Anthology | Won | |
| The Year's Best Science Fiction (26th Annual Collection) | 2010 Locus Award | Anthology | Nominated | |
| The Year's Best Science Fiction (26th Annual Collection) | 2014 FantLab's Book of the Year Award | Anthology | Won | |
| The Year's Best Science Fiction (30th Annual Collection) | 2014 Locus Award | Anthology | Nominated | |
| Rogues (with George R. R. Martin) | 2015 Locus Award | Anthology | Won | |
| Rogues (with George R. R. Martin) | 2015 World Fantasy Award | Anthology | Nominated | |
| Rogues (with George R. R. Martin) | 2015 FantLab's Book of the Year Award | Anthology | Won | |
| The Year's Best Science Fiction (31st Annual Collection) | 2015 Locus Award | Anthology | Nominated | |
| The Book of Silverberg: Stories In Honor of Robert Silverberg (with William Schafer) | 2015 Locus Award | Anthology | Nominated | |
| Old Venus (with George R. R. Martin) | 2016 Locus Award | Anthology | Won | |
| The Year's Best Science Fiction (32nd Annual Collection) | 2016 Locus Award | Anthology | Nominated | |
| The Year's Best Science Fiction (33rd Annual Collection) | 2017 Locus Award | Anthology | Nominated | |
| The Book of Swords | 2018 Locus Award | Anthology | Won | |
| The Book of Swords | 2018 World Fantasy Award | Anthology | Nominated | |
| The Year's Best Science Fiction (34th Annual Collection) | 2018 Locus Award | Anthology | Nominated | |
| Sense of Wonder: Short Fiction Reviews (2009-2017) | 2019 Locus Award | Non-Fiction | Nominated | |
| The Book of Magic | 2019 Locus Award | Anthology | Won | |
| The Book of Magic | 2019 World Fantasy Award | Anthology | Nominated | |
| The Year's Best Science Fiction (35th Annual Collection) | 2019 Locus Award | Anthology | Nominated | |
| The Year's Best Science Fiction (35th Annual Collection) | 2019 Hugo Award | Professional Editor (Short Form) | Won | |
| The Very Best of the Best: 35 Years of The Year's Best Science Fiction | 2020 Locus Award | Anthology | Nominated | |
| City Under the Stars (with Michael Swanwick) | 2021 Locus Award | SF Novel | Nominated | |
| | 1998 SF Chronicle Award | Pro Editor - Magazines | Won | |
| | 2011 Science Fiction and Fantasy Hall of Fame | | Inducted | |
| | 2016 Edward E. Smith Memorial Award | | Won | |
| | 2017 Science Fiction and Fantasy Writers Association | Kate Wilhelm Solstice Award | Won | |

== Critical studies and reviews of Dozois's work ==
Old Venus

- Sakers, Don (May 2015). "The Reference Library". Analog Science Fiction and Fact. 135 (5): 104–107.
