= Escape from Earth =

2006 anthology edited by Jack Dann and Gardner Dozois

Escape from Earth: New Adventures in Space
- First edition
- Editors: Edited by Jack Dann & Gardner Dozois
- Language: English
- Genre: Science fiction
- Publisher: Science Fiction Book Club
- Publication date: 2006
- Publication place: United States
- Media type: Print (hardcover)
- Pages: 432
- ISBN: 978-1-58288-225-3
- OCLC: 76786308
- Dewey Decimal: 813/.60876208 22
- LC Class: PS648.S3 E83 2006

Escape from Earth: New Adventures in Space is an anthology of original science fiction novellas edited by American writers Jack Dann and Gardner Dozois, published in 2006.

== Contents ==
The book includes 7 novellas, all commissioned for this book and published here for the first time. The stories are as follows.

- Allen Steele: "Escape from Earth"
- Kage Baker: "Where the Golden Apples Grow"
- Geoffrey A. Landis: "Derelict"
- Orson Scott Card: "Space Boy"
- Walter Jon Williams: "Incarnation Day"
- Elizabeth Moon: "Combat Shopping"
- Joe Haldeman: "The Mars Girl"
