= Hackers (anthology) =

Science fiction anthology

- Original paperback cover
- Editors: Jack Dann and Gardner Dozois
- Cover artist: Sharmen Liao
- Language: English
- Series: Jack Dann and Gardner Dozois Ace anthology series
- Genre: Science fiction
- Publisher: Ace Books
- Publication date: 1996
- Publication place: United States
- Media type: Print (Paperback)
- Pages: 256
- ISBN: 0-441-00375-3
- OCLC: 35595857
- Preceded by: Dinosaurs II
- Followed by: Timegates

Hackers is an anthology of science fiction short stories edited by Jack Dann and Gardner Dozois. It was first published in 1996. It contains stories by science fiction and cyberpunk writers of the late 1980s and early 1990s about hackers.

== Contents ==
=== "Spirit of the Night" ===
This story was written by Tom Maddox, and was first published in Isaac Asimov's Science Fiction Magazine in 1987. This is the story of a man whose wife is kidnapped during a business dealing about bio computers. The man then finds out that his wife's electronic records have disappeared. Bound by his wife's love, he plunges back to his hacker days to track his wife's abductor, and even enlists the help of his old college hacking master. Thinking originally that it was the company involved in the business deal, he blackmails them, but then finds out that something else may be behind the ordeal.

=== "Blood Sisters" ===
This story was written by Greg Egan, and was first published in Interzone 44 in 1991. Two twin sisters in the near future find themselves in the middle of a world where a virus evolved through mutation and natural selection as part of biological warfare research has escaped. Both sisters become infected with a version of the virus, but only one of them survives. The surviving sister uses her hacking skills to find out the reason behind her sister's death, exact revenge and inform the public.

=== "Rock On" ===
This story was written by Pat Cadigan, and was first published in the anthology Light Years and Dark in 1984. This story takes place in a post-modern world where rock and roll is about to become extinct. Bands of the time have to use "sinners" (synthesizers), or people who have experienced rock and roll in person, in order to realize their music. This is the story of one such sinner.

=== "The Pardoner's Tale" ===
This story was written by Robert Silverberg and was first published in Playboy in 1987. In the future, an alien species has colonized the Earth and used the humans' own information infrastructure to control them through their in-body implants. Hackers have become valuable because they can exploit the system. Some hackers have become known as pardoners because they can arrange for people to escape the aliens' sentences in exchange for profit. The story focuses on one of the best pardoners. He is bested in a hacking duel only to find out that his opponent is an android. The pardoner faces a mistake he made in his past and finds a way to escape by hacking the alien mainframe with the help of a woman he had swindled.

=== "Living Will" ===
This story was written by Alexander Jablokov and was first published in Isaac Asimov's Science Fiction Magazine in June 1991. A man afflicted with Alzheimer's disease programs his personality into a computer, and enlists the machine's help for his final wish.

=== "Dogfight" ===
This story was written by Michael Swanwick and William Gibson, and was first published in Omni in 1985. A lonely ex-shoplifter who suffers from a neural block preventing him from returning to his hometown of Washington, D.C., finds a female friend, whose parents have set a neural block on her to protect her virginity – a sort of a mental chastity belt. He becomes enthralled by a new video game – Fokkers & Spads – where he engages in dogfights as a World War I fighter pilot and, with help from his female friend (a gifted hacker of both hardware and software) becomes one of the best fighters. To beat the very best fighter, though, he betrays and hurts his newfound friend only to find himself alone again after his victory over the crippled war-veteran Tiny.

The story is typical of the cyberpunk genre in that its mood never rises from the melancholy and that the protagonist ends up suffering a kind of pyrrhic victory, realizing too late that succeeding in his endeavor (i.e. winning the game) has cost him too dearly. As in film noir, the theme of betrayal exists strongly in the tale, as the protagonist sacrifices everything around him to succeed.

=== "Our Neural Chernobyl" ===
This story was written by Bruce Sterling, and was first published in The Magazine of Fantasy and Science Fiction in 1988. In a bizarre future, free from AIDS and genetic diseases, everyone can be a human genome hacker. One such hacker/scientist, while trying to find a way for the human body to become a cocaine-producing factory, engineers a virus that enriches the dendritic connections of mammalian brains. This virus seems to produce eccentric, absent-minded geniuses, but most humans are apparently immune to this neural Chernobyl (though the reader should be aware of the possibility of an unreliable narrator). Instead, it is animals that suffer the most obvious changes as a result of this virus, leading to more intelligent dogs and cats, as well as a culturally aware raccoon society.

=== "(Learning About) Machine Sex" ===
This story was written by Candas Jane Dorsey, and was first published in Machine Sex and Other Stories in 1988. A young female hacker, coming to terms with her own sexuality, invents "wet-ware": software and hardware that can plug into the human body, and has the ability to sexually stimulate men.

=== "Conversations with Michael" ===
This story was written by Daniel Marcus, and was first published in Isaac Asimov's Science Fiction Magazine in 1994. A couple is faced with having to deal with the loss of their child due to a partial nuclear meltdown. The mother comes to terms with the loss by having conversations with her son in a virtual reality setting, at first assisted by an analyst and then on her own. The father cannot come to terms with the loss of his son, and instead immerses himself in virtual reality almost completely, disregarding even his own health.

=== "Gene Wars" ===
This story was written by Paul J. McAuley, and was first published in Interzone 48 in 1991. The story tells of the progress that humanity makes by hacking genes. It originally starts with companies using their power and knowledge to profit by introducing stronger crops and preventing a cure for HIV, but then it progresses into a genetic war as people and countries make use of these new genes without licensing them from the companies that made them. The story's main character is Evan, who finds himself in the middle of the gene wars immediately after graduating with a degree in molecular genetics. He becomes deeply involved in his company's business, but is eventually infected with a Trojan horse that removes the loyalty genes the companies had put into him. Evan makes a cure for HIV available and eventually brings about a fundamental change in genetics that allows people to change and shape their own bodies. No one has to die anymore and some people, greens, even choose to get all their sustenance from the sun. In a telling quote from the story Evan says, "I remember when you knew what a human being was, I suppose I'm old-fashioned, but there it is."

=== "Spew" ===
This story was written by Neal Stephenson, and was first published in Wired in 1994. The story is presented in the form of a letter from the main character, Stark, to a female cyberpunk whom he meets in the course of his work. In the story, most information and media channels are hooked together in something called the Spew. This is a vision of the Internet's adaptation for handling credit card transactions, security camera feeds, and other such digital data. It is possible to profile people in a most complete way because the Spew was allowed by the government to be insecure. Stark is hired as a Profile Auditor, someone who tracks other people and their profiles in the Spew in order to track consumer trends. He does this inside the Demosphere, or in DemoTainment Space, which is a virtual reality representation of the Spew. He comes across a woman whose profile seems "too normal" and discovers that she is a cypherpunk, using the Spew to her own advantage without being tracked.

=== "Tangents" ===
This story was written by Greg Bear, and was first published in Omni in January 1986. Pal Tremont, a Korean boy who likes classical music, is adopted by an American family and comes into the life of Peter Tuthy and writer Lauren Davies. Peter is a mathematician and computer hacker (seemingly based in part on Alan Turing) who is very interested in 4-dimensional space (4-D). Lauren wants Pal to help her with her writings, but Pal is more useful to Peter as he can easily visualize 4-D space. Pal is able to see a whole new world, inhabited by 4-D beings and is even able to play 4-D music for them. The beings eventually make contact and take Pal and Peter into their own world.
