= Jack Dann =

American writer (born 1945)

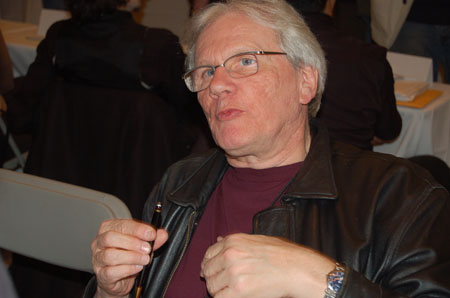
- Born: Jack Dann; February 15, 1945 (age 81); Johnson City, New York, U.S.
- Education: Binghamton University (BA)
- Occupation: Writer
- Writing career
- Language: English
- Years active: 1970–present
- Notable awards: World Fantasy Award—Anthology 1999 and 2017; Nebula Award for Best Novella 1997
- Website: jackdann.com

Jack Dann (born February 15, 1945) is an American writer best known for his science fiction, as well as an editor and a writing teacher, who has lived in Australia since 1994. He has published over seventy books, the majority being as editor or co-editor of story anthologies in the science fiction, fantasy and horror genres. He has published nine novels, numerous shorter works of fiction, essays, and poetry, and his books have been translated into thirteen languages. His work, which includes fiction in the science fiction, fantasy, horror, magical realism, and historical and alternative history genres, has been compared to Jorge Luis Borges, Roald Dahl, Lewis Carroll, J. G. Ballard, and Philip K. Dick.

== Life and career ==
=== Early life ===
Jack Dann was born to a Jewish family in New York State in 1945 and grew up in Johnson City, New York. His father was an attorney and a judge. Dann describes himself as having been "a troublesome child in a very small town", and in his teens associated with a local gang. Following an incident during which gang members let off fireworks, which led to injuries, his parents enrolled him in a military academy, which he chose against the alternative option of a reform school, and where he remained for two years.

Subsequently, he commenced theater studies at Hofstra University in New York City. However, in 1965 he contracted peritonitis after a poorly performed operation for appendicitis. He was considered unlikely to survive by his doctors, and spent four months recovering in hospital, at one stage sharing a ward with members of the Mafia who had been injured in a gun battle. He attributes a major change in outlook to his survival, and began a search for a fulfilling and meaningful vocation, which eventually led to him taking up writing.

Following discharge from hospital, he moved to Binghamton, New York where he continued his studies. He was awarded a BA in social and political science in 1968 from Binghamton University and later undertook postgraduate studies in law at St John's Law School from 1969 to 1971. He lived in Binghamton for much of the next 30 years. His long term loyalty to the town which persisted until his move to Australia in 1994 earned him the description of 'the hermit of Binghamton' among his friends.

He was introduced to genre fiction, and in particular science fiction, from an early age, as his father had a collection of science fiction books which lined the walls of Dann's bedroom and he recalls "gazing at the colorful covers before I could read." In the late 1960s, he encountered a number of now well-known writers and editors in the science fiction and fantasy field, including George Zebrowski, Pamela Sargent, Gardner Dozois, Jack Haldeman and Joe Haldeman, two of whom, Zebrowski and Sargent, also lived in Binghamton and were students with Dann at Binghamton University (then known as SUNY Binghamton).

Dann was soon collaborating with Zebrowski, "sitting on opposite sides of a table in his dining room and writing on an old manual typewriter" and in 1970 sold two of these collaborations, "Dark, Dark the Dead Star" and "Traps," to the magazine Worlds of If, with 'Traps' being Dann's first published work when it appeared in March 1970. Dann had previously sold a story to Damon Knight for Orbit, but this took almost two years to be published. Zebrowski also introduced Dann to the world of science fiction conventions and fandom, a culture he has been involved in ever since.

Initially he combined continued sales of his stories with work as a door-to-door salesman, which began after a commission for his first novel, Starhiker, was not finalized by his prospective publisher and he had become indebted, expecting payment for the piece. While continuing his writing, he moved on from sales to commence a business career, starting companies in the advertising, cable and insurance industries, among others and later working as a business consultant. He also taught writing at Cornell University in 1973.

He published his first book as editor, Wandering Stars: An Anthology of Jewish Fantasy and Science Fiction in 1974, and his first novel, Starhiker, in 1977.

=== Move to Australia ===
In 1994 he moved to Melbourne to join Janeen Webb, a Melbourne science fiction critic, academic, and writer, whom he met at a conference in San Francisco and married in 1995. It was the second marriage for each of them. He has since collaborated with Webb on several writing and editing projects and the couple are well known in Australian speculative fiction culture.

He currently lives on a farm overlooking the sea near Foster, in the Gippsland region of Victoria, but also typically spends some period of each year in Los Angeles and New York. In 2016 he received a Ph.D. from the University of Queensland, School of Communication and Arts. His dissertation was titled "Shadows in the Stone and a Study of Historical Divergence".

== Work as an editor and anthologist ==
He was editor of the SFWA Bulletin from 1970 to 1975. He was assistant editor 1970–1972, and managing editor 1973–1975. He has been a consulting editor for Tor Books since 1994.

Of the more than 70 books he has published, most have been themed fiction anthologies in the fantasy, science fiction, and horror genres, of which he has been editor, or co-editor. His anthologies tend to be prefaced by his essays on the theme of the anthology and the writers represented therein.

His first published anthology was Wandering Stars: An Anthology of Jewish Fantasy and Science Fiction (1974), collecting stories by Jewish Authors and/or relating to Jewish themes. The volume celebrated a strong Jewish tradition of fantasy in literature and also brought attention to Jewish writers in the field, some of whom had not been previously widely recognised for their contributions to its genesis. It was one of the most acclaimed American anthologies of the 1970s, and was later followed by More Wandering Stars: Outstanding Stories of Jewish Fantasy and Science Fiction (1981). Dann also co-edited, with Grania Davidson Davis, Everybody Has Somebody in Heaven: Essential Jewish Tales of the Spirit, a collection of short fiction by Avram Davidson, a Hugo and multi World Fantasy Award-winning Jewish American writer of science fiction, fantasy and crime, which was published in October 2000.

In 1987 he published In the Field of Fire, co-editing with then wife, Jeanne Van Buren, a collection of science fiction and fantasy stories relating to the horrors of the Vietnam War. It was nominated for Best Anthology in the 1988 World Fantasy and Locus awards. The collection was the first science fiction anthology to have a review featured on the front page of the New York Times Book Review.

In 1998 he published an anthology of Australian science fiction and fantasy Dreaming Down-Under co-editing with wife Janeen Webb. It won Australia's Ditmar Award and is the first Australian fiction book ever to win the prestigious World Fantasy Award. (Donald H. Tuck's 1979 award was for a non-fiction work).

In August 2003 he published Gathering the Bones, as co-editor with Ramsey Campbell and Dennis Etchison, a collection of horror stories from the United Kingdom, The US and Australia, which was included in Library Journal's "Best Genre Fiction of 2003" and was shortlisted for the World Fantasy Award.

He has also published, as editor, a further volume of Australian speculative fiction Dreaming Again, anthologies of Nebula Award winning stories, and many other anthologies, both singularly and in collaboration with others.

=== "Magic Tales" anthologies ===
Many of his anthologies have been editorial collaborations with Gardner Dozois. Of these, the most extensive series has been the "Magic Tales" anthologies, initially published by Ace Books and commencing with Unicorns! in 1982. Across over 30 volumes, this series collected and republished short stories centering on a number of fantasy and science fiction themes, such as aliens, mermaids, dinosaurs, dragons, and clones. The selected stories tend to be reprints of previously published works, and some are decades old. Each book has a preface by the editors, and each story is preceded by a short introduction, focusing on other works by the story's author.

=== Anthologies co-edited with Gardner Dozois ===
- Aliens! (April 1980, Pocket Books, ISBN 0-671-83155-0)
- Unicorns! (May 1982, 0-441-85441-9)
- Magicats! (June 1984, ISBN 978-0-441-51532-5)
- Bestiary! (October 1985, ISBN 978-0-441-05508-1)
- Mermaids! (January 1986, ISBN 978-0-441-52567-6)
- Sorcerers! (October 1986, ISBN 978-0-441-77532-3)
- Demons! (July 1987, ISBN 978-0-441-14264-4)
- Dogtales! (September 1988, ISBN 978-0-441-15760-0)
- Seaserpents! (December 1989, ISBN 978-0-441-75682-7)
- Dinosaurs! (June 1990, ISBN 978-0-441-14883-7)
- Little People! (March 1991, ISBN 978-0-441-50391-9)
- Magicats II (December 1991, ISBN 978-0-441-51533-2)
- Unicorns II (November 1992, ISBN 978-0-441-84564-4)
- Dragons! (August 1993, ISBN 978-0-441-16631-2)
- Invaders! (December 1993, ISBN 978-0-441-01519-1)
- Horses! (May 1994, ISBN 978-0-441-00057-9)
- Angels! (June 1995, ISBN 978-0-441-00220-7)
- Dinosaurs II (December 1995, ISBN 978-0-441-00285-6)
- Hackers (October 1996, ISBN 978-0-441-00375-4)
- Timegates (March 1997, ISBN 978-0-441-00428-7)
- Clones (April 1998, ISBN 978-0-441-00522-2)
- Immortals (July 1998, ISBN 978-0-441-00539-0)
- Nanotech (December 1998, ISBN 978-0-441-00585-7)
- Future War (August 1999, ISBN 978-0-441-00639-7)
- Armageddons (November 1999, ISBN 978-0-441-00675-5)
- Aliens Among Us (June 2000, ISBN 978-0-441-00704-2)
- Genometry (January 2001, ISBN 978-0-441-00797-4)
- Space Soldiers (April 2001, ISBN 978-0-441-00824-7)
- Future Sports (June 2002, ISBN 978-0-441-00961-9)
- Beyond Flesh (December 2002, ISBN 978-0-441-00999-2)
- Future Crimes (December 2003, ISBN 978-0-441-01118-6)
- A.I.s (December 2004, ISBN 978-0-441-01216-9)
- Robots (August 2005, ISBN 978-0-441-01321-0)
- Beyond Singularity (December 2005, ISBN 978-0-441-01363-0)
- Escape from Earth (August 2006, Science Fiction Book Club, ISBN 978-1-58288-225-3)
- Futures Past (November 2006, ISBN 978-0-441-01454-5)
- Dangerous Games (April 2007, ISBN 978-0-441-01490-3)
- Wizards (May 2007, ISBN 978-1-101-20874-8)

=== Other anthologies edited or co-edited by Jack Dann ===
- Wandering Stars (1974)
- Nebula Awards 32 (1998)
- Nebula Awards Showcase 2005 (2005)

== Writing career ==
=== Shorter works of fiction ===
Short stories, novelettes and novellas have comprised the vast majority of his fiction and over 100 of these, in multiple genres, have been published across his writing career. His short stories have appeared in Omni and Playboy and other major magazines and anthologies and have been collected in Timetipping (1980), the retrospective short story collection Jubilee: the Essential Jack Dann (2001), including an introduction and notes by Dann and Visitations (2003).

Major shorter works include: 'Junction', a novella, later expanded into a novel, published in Fantastic Science Fiction and Fantasy Stories 23 in November 1973; 'The Dybbuk Dolls', published in New Dimensions of Science Fiction Number 5 in 1975, a fantastic tale portraying Jews in a dystopian future United States; 'Camps', published in Fantasy and Science Fiction in May 1979, a story of a terminally ill young man who experiences another man's past in a concentration camp, part-based on Dann's own brush with death in his youth; 'Down among the Dead Men', published in Oui on 11 July 1982 and co written by Gardner Dozois, also focusing on a concentration camp - the story was awarded the Premios Gilgames de Narrativa Fantastica award; 'Bad Medicine', published in Asimov's Science Fiction Magazine in October 1986, an except from his novel Counting Coup, substantially revised.

His novella 'Da Vinci Rising', using sections of novel The Memory Cathedral together with approximately 5,000 words of new writing won the Nebula Award in 1996 and short story 'Niagara Falling', co written by Janeen Webb was awarded the Aurealis Award in 1998.

=== Novels ===
His first four novels were science fiction or variants thereon. As from the Memory Cathedral (1995), further novels have been alternate history and/or magical realism. In keeping with a practice not uncommon among science fiction writers, his bibliography shows several of his novels having been preceded by the publication of shorter works of varying length, which are progenitors, partial serialisations or extracts from his eventual full length published books.

Reading guides for Dann's novels The Memory Cathedral, The Rebel: An Imagined Life of James Dean, The Silent, and Bad Medicine are available on the Dann's author page on the website of publisher HarperCollinsAustralia. Each guide includes reflections by the author on writing the book, questions for use with reading groups, and a list of books for further reading on the setting or related issues.

==== Starhiker (1977) ====
His first novel describes the cosmic voyage of Bo, a young man with an itinerant outlook, who is the inhabitant of a future Earth which has little importance in galactic affairs, and is under extraterrestrial occupation by the Hrau, principally for use as relay station for galactic spacecraft. Bo boards one of these craft and hence encounters a range of confronting and transcendent experiences, often with a dreamlike quality, before eventually returning to his home.

Sections of Starhiker were serialized as two novellas in Amazing from June–September 1976, prior to the publication of the full novel version. It was translated into German, and published as Welten-Vagabund in 1979.

==== Junction (1981) ====
The novel begins in a small town in the 19th-century fashioned Midwestern United States, which is separated from reality: apparently it is the only human settlement left on Earth, now situated close to Hell. Protagonist Ned Wheeler leaves the town, undertaking a journey into hell and emerging in a 20th-century New York where many have dreamt of him prior to his arrival.

Science fiction writer Philip K. Dick was greatly impressed with the novel, commenting: "Junction is where Ursula Le Guin's The Lathe of Heaven and Tony Boucher's "The Quest for Saint Aquin" meet... and yet it is an entirely new novel ... I may very well be basing some of my future work on Junction."

A novella version of Junction was published in Fantastic in November 1973. It was nominated for the 1974 Nebula Award and Locus Award. Dann reworked this tale for some years through a number of drafts, publishing a further section entitled "Islands of Time" in Fantastic in September 1977. Finally the sections were combined with further material to form the full novel published in 1981. It was translated into German by Rainer Schmidt and published as Grenzland der Hölle in 1985.

==== The Man Who Melted (1984) ====
Set in the 21st Century, it presents a post-apocalyptic world in which telepathic shock waves – an outbreak of collective fear from the unconscious of millions - have led to widespread destruction and the reduction of many human beings to inhuman "screamers". The protagonist, Raymond Mantle, searches through this shattered world for his wife, whose absence from his life he is aware of, but whose actual presence in his memories has been erased by the "Scream". The novel also imagines a future where unfamiliar forms of consciousness, introduced by the new telepathic reality created by the "Scream", have altered the nature of humanity and questionable moral practices have become common, including the commercial availability of suicide in scenarios such as a reenactment of the sinking of the Titanic and the option of gambling with one's organs. Extrapolations in the book include a precocious vision of the Internet.

The novel attracted significant praise within the science fiction genre and was appreciated by both followers of humanistic and cyberpunk traditions in that field. It was compared to Ingmar Bergman's film The Seventh Seal by the Washington Post, and it was described as among the greatest science fiction novels by Science Fiction Age.

It was translated into French by Bernard Sigaud and published as La Grande Hurle in 1987, and also translated into German and published as Der Schmelzende Mensch in 1989.

It was nominated for best novel in the 1985 Nebula Award, and Best Science Fiction Novel in the 1985 Locus Award. Revised extracts and shorter versions were published under various titles, including the novella "Amnesia" which was published in The Berkley Showcase, Vol. 3: New Writings in Science Fiction and Fantasy in 1981 and was nominated for Nebula Award for Best Novella in 1982.

==== High Steel (1993) with Jack C. Haldeman, II ====
Set in a 22nd-century Earth overshadowed by mega-corporations, the novel follows John Stranger, a Native American who is forced from his reservation home by the Trans-United company to work in orbital space construction. Stranger's shamanistic skills become prized by his employer to assist in a race against rival companies to decode an alien transmission containing blueprints for a faster-than-light space drive.

The novel was an expanded version of the novelette Echoes of Thunder, which was published in a Tor Double Novel volume with Harlan Ellison's Run for the Stars in 1991. Dann is working on a sequel entitled Ghost Dance with author Barbara Delaplace. Delaplace is the wife of Jack C. Haldeman, II, who died in 2002.

==== The Memory Cathedral (1995) ====
Dann's major historical novel depicts a version of the Renaissance in which Leonardo da Vinci actually constructs a number of his inventions, such as a flying machine, whose designs are well known from his surviving sketches. He later employs some of his military inventions during a battle in the Middle East, while in the service of a Syrian general – events which Dann projects into a year of da Vinci's life about which little is known. The novel also presents a detailed imagining of the life and character of the inventor and painter during this period, and includes his encounters with other historical characters residing in Florence including Machiavelli and Botticelli.

The title refers to an ancient system of memory recall, or Mnemonics, in which a building, such as a cathedral, is constructed in the mind as a container for imagined objects - which are deliberately connected to particular memories. The building can later be mentally navigated to re-encounter those objects and retrieve the memories with which they are associated. Da Vinci's memory cathedral functions in the narrative as a device through which he reviews his experiences as death approaches.

It was first published by Bantam Books in December 1995 and has been published in ten languages to date. It won the Australian Aurealis Award in 1997, was #1 on The Age bestseller list, and in 1996, a novella based on the novel, "Da Vinci Rising," was awarded the Nebula Award for Best Novella. The Memory Cathedral was also shortlisted for the Audio Book of the Year, which was part of the 1998 Braille & Talking Book Library Awards.

==== The Silent (1998) ====
Dann's second historical novel adopts a first person perspective, and is written in the form of a journal produced by Edmund "Mundy" McDowell, a teenager in 1862 during the American Civil War, who writes as a form of therapy later in life – or possibly as a restless spirit. After his home is razed, and his mother raped and murdered by looters, he embarks upon a journey across wartime Virginia. The trauma of his experiences has rendered him mute, hence the title of the piece. It also colours his journey – which depicts the battlefield horrors of the American Civil War and its impact graphically - with visions of ghosts, spirits and an omnipresent "spirit dog" with symbolic resonances of the essence of warfare.

==== Bad Medicine (2000; also known as Counting Coup) ====
This road trip novel relates the juvenile but revelatory antics of two men in their 60s, Charlie Sarris, an apartment supervisor and John Stone, a Native American medicine man, who meets Charlie when he moves into his apartment block. Both characters are deeply flawed, lamenting their lost youth and first discover kinship in their copious consumption of alcohol. After Charlie discovers that his teenage daughter is pregnant, and can little cope with the parental responsibilities this implies, he accompanies John on a trip to Florida, where John intends to confront his shamanistic rival, Whiteshirt. The journey is marked by indulgent, illegal and destructive behavior on the part of both men, apparently influenced by a curse placed upon John by Whiteshirt, which equally affects Charlie and leaves them acting ostensibly as caricatures of the worst aspects of their natures.

The novel was published several years after completion, after being delayed by the collapse of original publisher, Bluejay Books. A novelette version, a revised excerpt from the novel, was published by in Isaac Asimov's Science Fiction Magazine 8 in October 1984, and was shortlisted for Locus Award for Best Novelette, Nebula Award for Best Novelette and World Fantasy Award for Best Short Story in 1985.

==== The Rebel: An Imagined Life of James Dean (2004) ====
Following on from the secret history and alternate history approach used in The Memory Cathedral and The Silent, The Rebel supposes a version of the 1950s in which the actor James Dean survived his infamous fatal car crash, and goes on to become a major star, film director and later Governor of California. As with The Memory Cathedral, the novel includes encounters with a number of other iconic figures of the period, including Marilyn Monroe, the Kennedy family and Elvis Presley.

This novel is published by HarperCollins Flamingo in Australia and Morrow in the U.S. Locus wrote: "The Rebel is a significant and very gripping novel, a welcome addition to Jack Dann's growing oeuvre of speculative historical novels, sustaining further his long-standing contemplation of the modalities of myth and memory. This is alternate history with passion and difference." A companion volume, Promised Land, appeared from PS Publishing in 2007 and further explores, through short stories and novellas, both elements of the actual and alternative 1950s setting as presented in the novel.

==== The Economy of Light (2008) ====
Michael Swanwick provided an introduction to this short horror novel about a retired Nazi hunter, whose siblings were murdered by Nazi prison doctor, Josef Mengele. He is propelled into an arduous and confronting journey into the Amazon jungle, in search of a rumored miracle working physician. This is instigated by the discovery of the purported remains of the infamous doctor, and the apparent need to purge the effects of a spiritual ailment, which strikes him at Mengele's graveside, and may be the source of diseases with which he has become afflicted.

It was nominated for a 2008 Aurealis Award in the category of Best Horror Novel.

=== Poetry ===
He has published poetry in collections, magazines, in the form of poetry postcards and a chapbook Christs and Other Poems (1978). The greater number of publications have been in The Anthology of Speculative Poetry and Rod Serling Presents The Twilight Zone Magazine.

=== Fiction collaborations ===
Since his initial collaborations with George Zebrowski, also forming his first published work, Jack Dann has undertaken joint fiction projects with a number of authors, including Susan Caspar, Barry N. Malzberg, Gardner Dozois, Jack C. Haldeman II, Michael Swanwick and his wife, Janeen Webb. Dann and Webb's 1997 story, "Niagara Falling," won both the Aurealis Award and Ditmar Award for short fiction in 1998. Most collaborations have been in the short story form, and Dann published a collection of these in The Fiction Factory (2005). However, they have included novellas, and he has also written one novel with Jack C. Haldeman II, High Steel (1993). The majority of the book length publications with which he is associated are editorial collaborations.

== Writing ==
=== Style ===
His stories are sometimes reminiscent in style to the work of Franz Kafka or Jorge Luis Borges and can be complex and challenging to the reader, with a considerable sense of mystery. They have great variety and are typically highly unpredictable. They often have a surreal, dreamlike or hallucinatory quality, playing with different types of reality. They may blur the distinction between subjective and objective viewpoints, with shifting conceptual landscapes and there is often a sense of nothing quite being what it seems. The language and the images used often have a poetic quality but his choice of expression is typically precise and can equally have considerable humor or a sense of darkness.

=== Technique ===
He is known for his meticulous and extensive research of his subjects and their relevant setting, which has been a salient feature of his alternative history novels such as The Memory Cathedral, The Rebel: an Imagined Life of James Dean and The Silent. In the case of The Rebel, novel, he read over 100 books relating to the 1950s setting. In keeping with the approach traditionally taken by scholars of history, he has expressed a preference for consulting primary sources, wherever possible. He has also suggested that 'writer's block' is not necessarily a negative experience, but an invitation from the subconscious to conduct more research, either through study, or through gathering and processing further life experiences, thus refilling the subconscious pool of material to fuel further creative work.

He studied in Method acting in the 1960s, a technique which involves total immersion into a character's life, experiences, habits and outlook, and parallels this propensity for in depth research. He has made links between this training and his approach to developing his fictional characters. In the case of his novel Bad Medicine, which includes a character who is a Native American medicine man, he spent a year with the Sioux People, and participated in traditional ceremonies.

He advocates the development of writing technique through rigorous writing workshops, where emerging writers are guided by established writers, which he feels is a fast track to gaining a professional writing style. He attributes the emergence of a number of talented writers in the science fiction field to this process and also suggests that his own writing has been shaped by his participation these types of events, including the Milford Writer's Workshop. Since becoming an established writer, he has taught writing and run workshops on a regular basis.

=== Genre ===
He has written in multiple genres and has indicated that he enjoys and embraces the particular qualities and tropes of these genres, but does not see himself as confined to a particular genre when embarking on a writing project and may include aspects of a number of genres in a particular work. He views genres primarily as marketing categories, helping to guide readers towards fiction of interest to them and also useful in helping a writer to build up and sustain an audience for their work. His fiction typically challenges the divide between literary and speculative fiction and can show equal resonances of writers in both traditions.

=== Themes ===
Charisma, memory, myth, witnessing the reality of The Holocaust and transformation are all themes in Dann's work he has either identified himself or have been highlighted by reviewers and commentators. His stories often deal with achieving transcendent states, undertaking spiritual journeys or encountering confronting experiences that dramatically alter the psyche. Many involve young men who are liberated from naive origins by journeys marked by alien, revelatory or otherwise confrontational experiences which transform them, leaving them with a greater connection and awareness of their general environment or wider fields of consciousness. His first and second published novels, Starhiker and Junction and a significant number of his short stories are examples of this trend. He has linked this preoccupation with his experience of coming close to death as a young man, following his hospitalisation in 1965, which he claims had a similar transformational effect on his character.

Dann is also notable in the science fiction field for having written a number of stories with Jewish themes. Dann has a Jewish background, and although affirming an affinity with the cultural aspects of this, has distanced himself from the theological tenets of Judaism due to his atheist outlook.

=== Influences ===
Dann has acknowledged the influence of a range of writers, including Jorge Luis Borges, Gabriel García Márquez, J.D. Salinger and J.G. Ballard. He has suggested particular influence from Ernest Hemingway's memoir of his 'down and out' days in Paris in the early 1920s, A Moveable Feast. Dann read this book during his convalescence from life-threatening illness in 1965, a key character forming event in his personal history.

== Awards ==
Work	Year & Award	Category	Result	Ref.
"Junction"	1974 Nebula Award	Novella	Nominated	
"Junction"	1974 Locus Award	Novella	Nominated	
Wandering Stars: An Anthology of Jewish Fantasy and Science Fiction	1975 Locus Award	Original Anthology	Nominated	
"The Dybbuk Dolls"	1976 Nebula Award	Novelette	Nominated	
Future Power (with Gardner Dozois)	1977 Locus Award	Anthology	Nominated	
"A Quiet Revolution for Death"	1979 Nebula Award	Short Story	Nominated	
"A Quiet Revolution for Death"	1979 Locus Award	Short Story	Nominated	
Immortals (with Gardner Dozois)	1979 Locus Award	Anthology	Nominated	
"Camps"	1980 Nebula Award	Novelette	Nominated	
"Camps"	1980 Locus Award	Novelette	Nominated	
"Camps"	1980 BSFA Award	Short Fiction	Nominated	
"Going Under"	1982 Nebula Award	Short Story	Nominated	
"Going Under"	1982 Locus Award	Novelette	Nominated	
"Fairy Tale"	1982 World Fantasy Award	Short Fiction	Nominated	
"Amnesia"	1982 Nebula Award	Novella	Nominated	
"Amnesia"	1982 Locus Award	Novella	Nominated	
More Wandering Stars	1982 Locus Award	Anthology	Nominated	
"High Steel" (with Jack C. Haldeman II)	1983 Nebula Award	Short Story	Nominated	
"High Steel" (with Jack C. Haldeman II)	1983 Locus Award	Novelette	Nominated	
"Blind Shemmy"	1984 Nebula Award	Novelette	Nominated	
"Blind Shemmy"	1984 SF Chronicle Award	Novelette	Nominated	
"Blind Shemmy"	1984 Locus Award	Novelette	Nominated	
"Bad Medicine"	1985 World Fantasy Award	Short Fiction	Nominated	
"Bad Medicine"	1985 Nebula Award	Novelette	Nominated	
"Bad Medicine"	1985 Locus Award	Novelette	Nominated	
The Man Who Melted	1985 Nebula Award	Novel	Nominated	
The Man Who Melted	1985 Locus Award	SF Novel	Nominated	
"The Gods of Mars" (with Gardner Dozois & Michael Swanwick)	1986 Nebula Award	Short Story	Nominated	
"The Gods of Mars" (with Gardner Dozois & Michael Swanwick)	1986 Locus Award	Short Story	Nominated	
Bestiary! (with Gardner Dozois)	1986 Locus Award	Anthology	Nominated	
In the Field of Fire (with Jeanne Van Buren Dann)	1988 World Fantasy Award	Anthology	Nominated	
In the Field of Fire (with Jeanne Van Buren Dann)	1988 Locus Award	Anthology	Nominated	
"Tea"	1989 Locus Award	Novelette	Nominated	
"Kaddish"	1990 Locus Award	Short Story	Nominated	
"Voices"	1992 Locus Award	Short Story	Nominated	
"Jumping The Road"	1993 Locus Award	Novelette	Nominated	
The Memory Cathedral	1996 Aurealis Award	Fantasy Novel	Won	
The Memory Cathedral	1997 Ditmar Award	Australian Long Fiction	Nominated	
"Da Vinci Rising"	1996 Asimov's Readers' Poll	Novella	5th Place	
"Da Vinci Rising"	1997 Nebula Award	Novella	Won	
"Niagara Falling" (with Janeen Webb)	1997 Aurealis Award	Science Fiction Short Story	Won	
"Niagara Falling" (with Janeen Webb)	1998 Ditmar Award	Short Fiction	Won	
Nebula Awards 32	1999 Locus Award	Anthology	Nominated	
Nanotech (with Gardner Dozois)	1999 Locus Award	Anthology	Nominated	
Dreaming Down-Under (with Janeen Webb)	1999 Ditmar Award	Australian Magazine or Anthology	Won	
Dreaming Down-Under (with Janeen Webb)	1999 World Fantasy Award	Anthology	Won	
Dreaming Down-Under (with Janeen Webb)	1999 Locus Award	Anthology	Nominated	
"Marilyn"	2000 Aurealis Award	Horror Short Story	Nominated	
"The Diamond Pit"	2001 Aurealis Award	Science Fiction Short Story	Nominated	
"The Diamond Pit"	2001 Aurealis Award	Fantasy Short Story	Nominated	
"The Diamond Pit"	2002 Hugo Award	Novella	Nominated	
"The Diamond Pit"	2002 Ditmar Award	Australian Short Fiction	Won	
"The Diamond Pit"	2002 Nebula Award	Novella	Nominated	
"The Diamond Pit"	2002 Locus Award	Novella	Nominated	
Jubilee	2002 Ditmar Award	Australian Collected Work	Nominated	
Jubilee	2002 Locus Award	Collection	Nominated	
Gathering the Bones (with Ramsey Campbell and Dennis Etchison)	2003 International Horror Guild Award	Anthology	Nominated	
Gathering the Bones (with Ramsey Campbell and Dennis Etchison)	2003 Bram Stoker Award	Anthology	Nominated	
Gathering the Bones (with Ramsey Campbell and Dennis Etchison)	2004 World Fantasy Award	Anthology	Nominated	
Gathering the Bones (with Ramsey Campbell and Dennis Etchison)	2004 Locus Award	Anthology	Nominated	
The Rebel	2004 Aurealis Award	Science Fiction Novel	Nominated	
The Rebel	2005 John W. Campbell Memorial Award	Science Fiction Novel	Finalist	
Nebula Awards Showcase 2005	2006 Locus Award	Anthology	Nominated	
Futures Past (with Gardner Dozois)	2007 Locus Award	Anthology	Nominated	
Escape from Earth (with Gardner Dozois)	2007 Locus Award	Anthology	Nominated	
Wizards: Magical Tales from the Masters of Modern Fantasy (with Gardner Dozois)	2007 Shirley Jackson Award	Anthology	Nominated	
Wizards: Magical Tales from the Masters of Modern Fantasy (with Gardner Dozois)	2008 World Fantasy Award	Anthology	Nominated	
Wizards: Magical Tales from the Masters of Modern Fantasy (with Gardner Dozois)	2008 Locus Award	Anthology	Nominated	
The Economy of Light	2008 Aurealis Award	Horror Novel	Nominated	
Dreaming Again	2008 Aurealis Award	Anthology	Nominated	
Dreaming Again	2009 Ditmar Award	Collected Work	Won	
Dreaming Again	2009 Locus Award	Anthology	Nominated	
The Dragon Book (with Gardner Dozois)	2010 Locus Award	Anthology	Nominated	
Ghosts By Gaslight (with Nick Gevers)	2011 Bram Stoker Award	Anthology	Nominated	
Ghosts By Gaslight (with Nick Gevers)	2011 Aurealis Award	Anthology	Won	
Ghosts By Gaslight (with Nick Gevers)	2011 Shirley Jackson Award	Anthology	Won	
Ghosts By Gaslight (with Nick Gevers)	2012 Locus Award	Anthology	Nominated	
Concentration	2016 Australian Shadows Awards	Collected Works	Nominated	
Concentration	2016 Aurealis Award	Collection	Nominated	
"Trainspotting in Winesburg"	2016 Aurealis Award	Science Fiction Short Story	Nominated	
Dreaming in the Dark	2016 Australian Shadows Awards	Edited Work	Nominated	
Dreaming in the Dark	2016 Aurealis Award	Anthology	Nominated	
Dreaming in the Dark	2017 Ditmar Award	Collected Work	Won	
Dreaming in the Dark	2017 World Fantasy Award	Anthology	Won	
I’m Looking Right At You, HP Lovecraft	2021 Australian Shadows Awards	Rocky Wood Award for Non-Fiction and Criticism	Won	
The Fiction Writer's Guide to Alternate History	2024 Locus Award	Non-Fiction	Nominated	
	2008 Aurealis Award	Convenors' Award for Excellence	Won	
	Premios Gilgamés de Narrativa Fantastica award		Won	

Dann has also been honoured by the Mark Twain Society (Esteemed Knight). He has been shortlisted for major science fiction and fantasy awards on numerous occasions.

== Reference works ==
As part of its Bibliographies of Modern Authors Series, The Borgo Press has published an annotated bibliography & guide entitled The Work of Jack Dann. An updated second edition is in progress. Dann is also listed in Contemporary Authors and the Contemporary Authors Autobiography Series; The International Authors and Writers Who's Who; Personalities of America; Men of Achievement; Who's Who in Writers, Editors, and Poets, United States and Canada; Dictionary of International Biography; the Directory of Distinguished Americans; Outstanding Writers of the 20th Century; and Who's Who in the World.

== 'The Man Who Melted Jack Dann' ==
The Man Who Melted Jack Dann is a word game inspired by Jack Dann's book The Man Who Melted (1984). The aim is to place the writer's name in front or behind the title of one of the writer's books and see if it leads to a funny sentence.

== Bibliography ==
=== Novels ===
- Dann, Jack (1977). Starhiker : a novel. New York: Harper & Row.
- —. Bad medicine.
- —. Junction.
- — (1984). The man who melted. Bluejay Books. ISBN 9780312942939.
- — (1995). The memory cathedral. Bantam Books. ISBN 9780553096378.
- — (1998). The silent. Bantam Books. ISBN 9780553097160.

=== Short fiction ===
Stories

Title	Year	First published	Reprinted/collected	Notes
Marilyn	2000	Dann, Jack (Aug 2000). "Marilyn". F&SF. 99 (2): 44–56.		
Waiting for Medusa	2013	Dann, Jack (Oct–Nov 2013). "Waiting for Medusa". Asimov's Science Fiction. 37 (10–11): 82–94.		

Anthologies

- Dann, Jack, ed. (1998). Wandering Stars. Jewish Lights Pub. ISBN 9781580230056.
- —, ed. (1981). More Wandering Stars. Doubleday. ISBN 9780385170727.
- —, ed. (2008). Dreaming Again. Harper Collins. ISBN 9780061364082.
- Dann, Jack & Janeen Webb, eds. (2001). Dreaming Down-Under. ISBN 9780312878115.
- Dann, Jack & Gardner Dozois, eds. (2009). The Dragon Book. Ace Books. ISBN 9780441017645.
- Dann, Jack & Jonathan Strahan (eds.). Australian Legends.
- Dann, Jack & Nick Gevers (eds.). Ghosts by Gaslight.

=== Checklists and bibliographies ===
- Blackmore, Leigh (1996). Ellison/Dowling/Dann : a bibliographic checklist. R'lyeh Texts.

=== Further reading ===
- Blackmore, Leigh "Time and Memory: An Interview with Jack Dann" (2003)
