= Dave Wolverton bibliography =

This is complete bibliography of American science fiction and fantasy author Dave Wolverton, who also writes under the pseudonym David Farland.

== Bibliography ==
=== Original works ===
==== Essays and articles ====
1. The Writers of the Future Decade (1994) – Originally published in L. Ron Hubbard Presents Writers of the Future, Volume X
2. About the Writers and Illustrators of the Future (1995) – Originally published in L. Ron Hubbard Presents Writers of the Future, Volume XI

==== Novelettes ====
1. The Sky is an Open Highway (1988) – Originally published in the July edition of Isaac Asimov's Science Fiction Magazine
2. My Favorite Christmas (1993) – Originally published in Christmas Forever
3. We Blazed (1995) – Originally published in Peter S. Beagle's Immortal Unicorn
4. In the Teeth of Glory (1995) – Originally published in David Copperfield's Tales of the Impossible
5. The Stone Mother's Curse (1996) – Originally published in Return to Avalon
6. My Favorite Christmas (2001) – Published in Leading Edge issue No. 41

==== Novels ====
1. On My Way to Paradise (1989)
2. Wheatfields Beyond (1993)
3. A Very Strange Trip (1999), based on a story by L. Ron Hubbard
4. In the Company of Angels (2009)

==== Short stories ====
1. "The Sky is an Open Highway" (1985) – published in Leading Edge, issue No. 10
2. "On My Way to Paradise" (1989) – Originally published in L. Ron Hubbard Presents Writers of the Future, Vol. III
3. "After a Lean Winter" (1996) - Originally published in War of the Worlds: Global Dispatches
4. "A Rarefied View at Dawn" (2005) – published in Orson Scott Card's InterGalactic Medicine Show, issue No. 1
5. "The Mooncalfe" (2006) – published in Orson Scott Card's InterGalactic Medicine Show, issue No. 2
6. "Sweetly The Dragon Dreams" (2008) – published in Orson Scott Card's InterGalactic Medicine Show, cover story, issue No. 10
7. "Feeding the Feral Children" (2011)
8. "A Rarefield View at Dawn" (2011)
9. "No Bird" (2012)
10. "At the Virgin's Doorstep" (2012)
11. "Skyfish" (2012)
12. "Homo Perfectus" (2013) – published in The Mad Scientist's Guide to World Domination

==== Series ====
===== Serpent Catch =====
1. Spirit Walker (1991)
2. Serpent Catch (1991)
3. Blade Kin (1993)
4. Path of the Crushed Heart (1993)

===== Ravenspell =====
1. Of Mice And Magic (2005) Published by Covenant Communications
2. The Wizard of Ooze (2007) Published by Covenant Communications
3. Freaky Flyday (2009) Published by Covenant Communications

===== The Golden Queen =====
1. The Golden Queen (1994)
2. Beyond the Gate (1995)
3. Lords of the Seventh Swarm (1997)

===== The Runelords =====
(Published under the pseudonym David Farland)

1. The Sum of All Men (1998)
2. Brotherhood of the Wolf (1999)
3. Wizardborn (2001)
4. The Lair of Bones (2003)
5. Sons of the Oak (2006)
6. Worldbinder (2007)
7. The Wyrmling Horde (2008)
8. Chaosbound (2009)
9. A Tale of Tales (Forthcoming)

===== Mummy Chronicles =====
1. Revenge of the Scorpion King (2001)
2. Heart of the Pharaoh (2001)
3. The Curse of the Nile (2001)
4. Flight of the Phoenix (2001)

===== Nightingale =====
1. Nightingale (2011)
2. Dream Assassin (Forthcoming)
3. Draghoul (Forthcoming)
4. Shadow Lord (Forthcoming)

=== Pre-existing series ===
==== Star Wars ====
1. The Courtship of Princess Leia (1994)

==== Star Wars: Jedi Apprentice ====
1. The Rising Force (1999)

=== Gamebooks ===
==== Star Wars Episode I Adventures ====
1. The Ghostling Children (2000)
2. The Hunt for Anakin Skywalker (2000)
3. Capture Arawynne (2000)
4. Trouble on Tatooine (2000)

==== Star Wars Missions ====
1. The Search for Grubba the Hutt (1998)
2. The Hunt For Han Solo (1998)
3. Ithorian Invasion (1997)
