= Life, the Universe, & Everything (symposium) =

Annual conference in Provo, Utah, US

- Status: Active
- Genre: Fantasy, horror, science fiction
- Venue: Provo Marriott Hotel & Conference Center
- Locations: Provo, Utah
- Country: United States
- Inaugurated: 1982
- Attendance: 600–1700
- Organizer: Utah County Events, LLC
- Website: ltue.net

Life, the Universe, & Everything: The Marion K. "Doc" Smith Symposium on Science Fiction and Fantasy (usually referred to, in shorthand, as the Life, the Universe, & Everything Symposium; or by the associated acronym LTUE), is an academic conference held annually since 1983 in Provo, Utah. It is the longest-running science fiction and fantasy convention in Utah, and is one of the largest and longest-running academic science fiction conferences in the United States and the world at large. An annual proceedings volume, Deep Thoughts (named after the computer Deep Thought from The Hitchhiker's Guide to the Galaxy), publishes the academic papers and main addresses given at the event. The symposium was named, jokingly, after the Douglas Adams novel Life, the Universe and Everything.

== History ==
The roots of the Life, the Universe, & Everything (LTUE) and other science fiction efforts at Brigham Young University (BYU) began with a one-day symposium on science fiction held on January 20, 1976. Four years later, Orson Scott Card gave a speech in 1980 at the university about morality in writing, which showed some of the students and faculty that a serious, academic forum for discussion of science fiction writing was a possibility at BYU, but there weren't enough students interested in trying to make things work at that time.

This changed in February 1982 when Ben Bova was invited to speak at a university forum event. The English Department assigned Marion Smith, the professor whose name is now part of the title of the symposium, to take care of Bova while he wasn't speaking. He and a handful of his writing students (including M. Shayne Bell) got together and held a discussion with Bova. This inspired those students to try to create something like that the following year, when they invited Card back to be the first guest of honor. The first official symposium was held in 1983.

From 1982 through 2011, the symposium was held at BYU. In 2012, it was held at Utah Valley University, and in 2013, it moved to the Provo Marriott Hotel and Conference Center in downtown Provo.

The Leading Edge science fiction and fantasy magazine was started by these same students, all members of a 1980 creative writing class at BYU.

== Guests ==
This is a list of Guests of Honor (in bold) and notable Special Guests.

Year	#	Dates	Guests	References
1983	1	February 7–12	**Orson Scott Card**	
1984	2	February 16-18	**James C. Christensen**	
1985	3	February 6–9	**Elizabeth Boyer**, **C. J. Cherryh**, **Frederik Pohl**	
1986	4	February 5–8	**Orson Scott Card**, **Alan Dean Foster**, Madeleine L'Engle (Note: L'Engle was invited as a guest to the symposium, but came later in the spring.)	
1987	5	February 4–7	**Orson Scott Card**, **Stephen R. Donaldson**, **Jack Williamson**, Julius Schwartz	
1988	6	February 3–6	**Algis Budrys**, **Tim Powers**, Ray Bradbury, (Note: Bradbury was invited as a guest to the symposium, but came later in the spring.) Michael R. Collings, Michael Whelan	
1989	7	February 1–4	**Karen Anderson**, **Poul Anderson**, **David Brin**, **Octavia Butler**	
1990	8	February 7–10	**Hal Clement**, **Robin McKinley**, **Mike Resnick**, Tracy Hickman	
1991	9	February 6–9	**Forrest J Ackerman**, **Connie Willis**	
1992	10	February 5–8	Jane Yolen	
1993	11	February 10–13	**Kevin J. Anderson**, **Orson Scott Card**, **Barbara Hambly**, Chris Heimerdinger, Rebecca Moesta	
1994	12	February 16–19	**Robert L. Forward**, **Katherine Kurtz**, **Roger Zelazny** (Note: This was the last major public appearance of Zelazny before he died in 1995.)	
1995	13	February 1–4	**Lois McMaster Bujold**, **Patricia McKillip**, **Richard Garfield**, **Sam Longoria**, **Néné Thomas**	
1996	14	January 31 - February 3	**Tracy Hickman**, **Dave Wolverton**, **Patricia Wrede**, M. Shayne Bell, Michael R. Collings, Steve Jackson, Michaelene Pendleton, W. R. Thompson, Kristine Kathryn Rusch, (Note: Kristine Kathryn Rusch and Dean Wesley Smith put on the Kris & Dean Show, a writing workshop, as a fundraiser for the symposium on January 5–6. They did not attend the symposium itself.) Dean Wesley Smith,	
1997	15	February 27 - March 1	**Orson Scott Card**, **Judith Moffett**	
1998	16	March 12–14	**Elizabeth Moon**, **Sherwood Smith**, **Dave Wolverton**	
1999	17		Kevin J. Anderson, Marty Brenneis, Michael Liebman, Rebecca Moesta	
2000	18	March 23–25	**David Howard**, **L. E. Modesitt, Jr.**, **Margaret Weis**, **M. K. Wren**	
2001	19		**Jeanne Cavelos**, **Tracy Hickman**, **Sam Longoria**, **Harry Turtledove**	
2002	20	February 21–23	**Marty Brenneis**, **Michael R. Collings**, **Larry Niven**, **Christian Ready**	
2003	21	February 13–15	**Esther Friesner**, **Patricia Wrede**, Orson Scott Card	
2004	22	February 19–21	**Matthew Candelaria**, **Michael R. Collings**, **Jim Conley**, **Robert J Defendi**, **Brian C. Hailes**, **Sam Longoria**, **Norman R. Peercy**, **William J. Widder**	
2005	23	February 17–19	**Michael R. Collings**, **David Howard**, **L. E. Modesitt, Jr.**, **Jerry Pournelle**	
2006	24	February 16–18	**Kevin J. Anderson**, **Michael R. Collings**, **Rebecca Moesta**, **Theresa Mather**, **Norman Peercy**	
2007	25	February 15–17	**Julie E. Czerneda**, **Gloria Skurzynski**, **Howard Tayler**, **Stacy Whitman**	
2008	26		Orson Scott Card, Gail Carson Levine, Kevin Wasden	
2009	27		Laura Hickman, Tracy Hickman	
2010	28	February 11–13	**Marty Brenneis**, **Nathan Hale**, **Brandon Sanderson**	
2011	29	February 17–19	**James Dashner**, **Steven Keele**	
2012	30		Mary Robinette Kowal, James A. Owen, Brandon Sanderson, Howard Tayler, Dan Wells	
2013	31	February 14–16	**Megan Whalen Turner** (literary), David Farland, Tracy and Laura Hickman, James A. Owen, Eric James Stone, Brad R. Torgersen, L. E. Modesitt, Jr.	
2014	32	February 13–15	**Orson Scott Card** (literary), Michael R. Collings, Michaelbrent Collings, David Farland, Brian C. Hailes, L. E. Modesitt Jr., James A. Owen, Brandon Sanderson, Anne Sowards	
2015	33	February 12–14	**Toni Weisskopf** (editor), Steven L. Peck, Eric G. Swedin, Michaelbrent Collings, Maxwell Alexander Drake, James Ganiere, Tracy Hickman, L.E. Modesitt, Jr., James A. Owen, Dan Wells	
2016	34	February 11–13	**Kevin J. Anderson** (literary), **Shannon Hale** (literary), Rebecca Moesta, Brandon Sanderson, Howard Tayler, Dan Wells, Stacy Whitman, Michelle Witte	
2017	35	February 16–18	**Beth Meacham** (editor), **Dan Wells** (literary), Alan Bahr, Susan Chang, Michaelbrent Collings, M. Todd Gallowglas, David Powers King, Lisa Mangum, Dennis Packard, Charlie Pulsipher	
2018	36	February 15–17	**Todd McCaffrey** (literary), **Jo Walton** (literary, fandom), Alan Bahr, Susan Chang, Myke Cole, Larry Correia, Jessica Douglas, David Farland	
2019	37	February 14–16	**Kelly Barnhill** (literary), **Brett Helquist** (artist), Brian C. Hailes, Charlie N. Holmberg, Matthew J. Kirby, Dr. Nik Rao, Brennan Smith, Eric D. Snider, Stacy L. Whitman	
2020	38	February 13–15	**Bobby Cody** (actor), **Howard Lyon** (artist), **Brad R. Torgersen** (literary), Kevin J. Anderson, Larry Correia, Devon Dorrity, Natasha Ence, Diana Pavlac Glyer, Megan Lloyd, Logan Long	
2021	39	February 11–13	**Kaitlund Zupanic** (artist), **Melinda M. Snodgrass** (screenplays), **Alaya Dawn Johnson** (literary), Michaelbrent Collings, Tom Durham, Ravyn Evermore, Jessica Day George, Kristy S. Gilbert, Troy Lambert, Julie Wright	
2022	40	February 17–19	**Jody Lynn Nye** (writing), **Megan Lloyd** (theater & media arts), **Brian C. Hailes** (artist)	
2023	41	February 16–18	**Phil Foglio**, **Nina Kiriki Hoffman**, **Jess Smart Smiley**, Brandon Mull (toastmaster), Blake Casselman, Jessica Day George, Michael F. Haspil, Aaron Johnston, M. A. Nichols, Lehua Parker, and Talysa Sainz.	
2024	42	February 15–17	**Aaron Johnston**, **Rebecca Moesta**, **Kaela Rivera**, Michael F. Haspil (toastmaster), Kevin J. Anderson, Wulf Moon, Robert Hatch.	
2025	43	February 13–15	**Paul Durham**, **Jennifer A. Nielsen**, **Isaac Stewart**, Cameron Hopkin (toastmaster), C. David Belt, Rose Card-Faux, Adam Heesch, Benjamin K. Hewett, David Howard, Jennifer Hulet, Mari Murdock, Peter Orullian, Craig Nybo and Lehua Parker.	
2026	44	February 12–14	**Ron Clements**, **Matt Dinniman**, **Charlie N. Holmberg**, Emily Goodwin (toastmaster), Suzy Bills, Esther Candari, Orson Scott Card, Robert J Defendi, Max Florschutz, M. Todd Gallowglas, and Clint Johnson.	
