= The Fifth Doll =

2017 dark fantasy novel by Charlie N. Holmberg

- Author: Charlie N. Holmberg
- Language: English
- Genre: Dark fantasy
- Publisher: 47North
- Publication date: August 15, 2017
- Publication place: United States
- Pages: 241
- ISBN: 978-1-4778-06104
- OCLC: 1023234734

The Fifth Doll is a 2017 dark fantasy novel written by Charlie N. Holmberg and published by 47North. It follows a dairymaid named Matrona as she discovers a secret collection of Russian nested dolls that are linked to each inhabitant of her village. The novel was awarded the 2017 Whitney Award for Speculative Fiction.

== Development ==
Holmberg first developed her idea for The Fifth Doll while planning for her presentation at an LDStorymakers conference. The presentation was on creating magic systems, and Holmberg was gathering household objects to pass out to conference attendees, planning to task them with developing a magic system for a particular item, when she "came across her set of Russian nesting dolls." She then pitched the idea to her agent and outlined a plot involving the magic system she'd imagined surrounding these dolls. She wrote the novel in six months. Holmberg cited The Giver by Lois Lowry and Cruel Beauty by Rosamund Hodge as inspiration. It was released on August 15, 2017.

== Plot summary ==
Matrona Vitsin is a twenty-six-year-old woman who lives in a small village. Ever since her younger sister mysteriously vanished as a baby, Matrona has had to shoulder much of the responsibility in running the family dairy. Matrona's parents are overjoyed that Feodor, the local butcher, is willing to marry their daughter. Matrona, however, has feelings for Jaska, the village potter. She has never divulged this secret to anyone—not even her best friend, Roksana.

While out on an errand, Matrona ventures into the house of Slava, the local tradesman, who has a room full of Matryoshka dolls, each one painted to look just like a member of the village. When Slava discovers that Matrona has seen the dolls, he chooses her to be his successor as keeper of the dolls. She is tasked with opening the layers of her doll one by one. Upon opening the first doll, all of Matrona's secrets are divulged to the entire town, including her feelings for Jaska. The second doll offers an internal attack, conjuring up all of the negative thoughts Matrona's ever had about herself. Realizing she can't move forward with Slava's plan for her, she tries to escape the village, only to discover it's trapped in a loop. Confused and frustrated, Matrona turns to Jaska; she tells him about the dolls, and he believes her. Opening Matrona's third doll brings her visions of a city and snow, which she's never seen before. Jaska asks her to open his first doll, and she does so, exposing his secrets—including his feelings for Matrona. Slava finds out what she's done, and tells Matrona of the dangers of opening all of the dolls at once. Matrona then goes to find her friend Roksana, who has discovered the dolls and opened hers all at once, resulting in her losing her mind. Matrona mourns for her friend. She manages to open Jaska's second doll without Slava noticing; she goes to comfort him as he undergoes the same mental torment she did, and the two share a kiss.

Opening her fourth doll and noticing that a fifth does not lie inside reveals to Matrona the truth of her situation: she and the other villagers are trapped in their town via magic. They were all taken away from their homes in Russia at Czar Nicholas II's request and transformed into fifth dolls. After learning this grand secret, all of the villagers (except for Roksana and Jaska's mother, whose dolls are fully opened) transform into wooden dolls. She manages to get Jaska back by gradually opening the rest of his doll. They realize that Slava's house is what holds the spell intact, so they destroy it. The village they've known their entire lives melts away into the cold reality of Russia, and their families and friends are restored to them. Matrona is reunited with her long-lost sister, and she calls off her engagement with Feodor after all that's happened. The villagers are left to live life in reality.

== Critical reception ==
The critical reviews of The Fifth Doll were mostly positive. Publishers Weekly's review of the novel detailed how "the plot's unexpected detours are entertaining." San Francisco Book Review applauded The Fifth Doll's complexity, highlighting "the contrast of the small-town village atmosphere—full of simple townspeople with simple dreams and worries—set against the complex and eerie backdrop of the village that’s not what it seems." Sharon Clayton for The Eclectic Review called The Fifth Doll "a very unique tale indeed." The audiobook version of the novel was named one of the top 10 audiobooks on audible.com by The Associated Press in April 2018.

== Awards ==
- 2017 Whitney Award for Speculative Fiction
