= The Paper Magician =

2014 fantasy novel by Charlie N. Holmberg

- Author: Charlie N. Holmberg
- Cover artist: Ryan Hobson
- Language: English
- Series: The Paper Magician series
- Genre: Fantasy
- Publisher: 47North
- Publication date: September 1, 2014
- Publication place: United States
- Pages: 224
- ISBN: 978-1-4778-2383-5
- Followed by: The Glass Magician

The Paper Magician is a 2014 fantasy novel by American writer Charlie N. Holmberg, published by 47North. It is Holmberg's debut novel and the first book in The Paper Magician series, followed by The Glass Magician (2014), The Master Magician (2015), and The Plastic Magician (2018). It follows apprentice magician Ceony Twill as she learns how to become a "Folder": one who manipulates paper through magic.

== Development ==
Holmberg developed her idea for The Paper Magician after learning Japanese and being exposed to the art of origami. In an interview with the Association for Mormon Letters, Holmberg said: "I thought it would be fun to write about origami that came to life. I initially wanted that to be a side-magic to a larger system, but ultimately made it the focus of the story." Holmberg's idea was also influenced by the advice of author Brandon Sanderson to limit the magical powers of characters. She thus decided that the magicians in her book would only be able to manipulate man-made materials, and that they would be required to "bond to something specifically".

Holmberg wanted to avoid crafting her protagonist's love interest with a "semblance of perfection," opting instead to create flawed characters and focus on themes of forgiveness and self-love. The setting of The Paper Magician was originally otherworldly, but Holmberg's editor encouraged her to make it historical. This resulted in the finished product being quite different from the original manuscript. Holmberg was influenced by the British historical drama Downton Abbey in creating The Paper Magician's setting. She wrote the novel while living in Moscow, Idaho. The Paper Magician was the ninth novel Holmberg completed and her first one to be published. Both The Paper Magician and The Glass Magician were sold to 47North, Amazon's publishing arm for speculative fiction, in the summer of 2013. Holmberg did not originally plan for the novel to be expanded into a series.

== Plot summary ==
In the year 1902, nineteen-year-old Ceony Twill graduates from the Tagis Praff School for the Magically Inclined at the top of her class, but her dreams for the future are unexpectedly dashed. In a world where magicians can only manipulate one man-made element, Ceony is forced to study the art of "Folding"—paper magic—instead of learning how to magically smelt metal as she'd hoped. After receiving the money necessary to pay her tuition from an unknown party, she becomes an apprentice to Paper Magician Emery Thane. When she arrives at his quirky cottage, she's greeted by a paper skeleton. Paper magic turns out to be more complex and exciting than Ceony had originally thought; she is able to tell people's fortunes and make paper puppets perform. Emery even crafts her a paper dog to keep her company. He teaches Ceony the value of creating entertainment for people. Ceony also learns that Emery has participated in efforts to rid the land of those who practice blood magic (a forbidden, dark art) called "Excisioners."

One day, Ceony watches as Emery's ex-wife, Lira, attacks him by ripping his heart out of his chest using blood magic. Ceony saves him by crafting a replacement heart out of paper, but she must retrieve his old heart if he is to survive. As other Excisioners begin to appear along the journey, Ceony is swept into the investigation of blood magic. She faces Lira as a part of this quest. She becomes trapped inside Emery's heart and learns about his true nature in the process. When she emerges, she again confronts Lira.

== Critical reception ==
Valerie Laub, a reviewer for Drexel University's publication The Triangle, praised The Paper Magician for its vivid and intense scenes, but said that she felt that the ending was "incredibly rushed," resulting in the novel being "underdeveloped" overall. Laub concluded her review, however, by calling the novel "truly a fun and exciting summer read for anyone who needs a break from the real world." Christine Rappleye for Deseret News highlighted The Paper Magician for its "interesting twist on magic". In her review of the book for School Library Journal, Rebecca James identified spots of inconsistency in the storyline. Publishers Weekly compared the novel to those of Patricia Wrede. The Paper Magician was nominated for the 2014 AML Award for Young Adult Speculative Fiction.

== Film adaptation ==
In 2016, The Walt Disney Company secured the film rights to The Paper Magician series. Allison Shearmur, producer of Cinderella (2015) and Rogue One, was reported to be involved in the project. Screenwriter Ashleigh Powell has been identified as the writer of the script. Holmberg has said that the purchase "doesn’t mean they have to make a movie, just that they can". She does not expect to be involved very much in the project.

== Awards and nominations ==
- 2014 AML Award for Speculative Fiction finalist
- 2015 American Library Association Fantasy Reading Shortlist
