= The Year's Best Science Fiction: Twenty-Second Annual Collection =

2005 anthology edited by Gardner Dozois

- Editor: Gardner Dozois
- Language: English
- Series: The Year's Best Science Fiction
- Genre: Science fiction
- Publisher: St. Martin's Press
- Publication date: 2005
- Publication place: United States
- Media type: Print (hardcover & trade paperback)
- Pages: 822 pp
- ISBN: 9780312336592 (hardcover)
- Preceded by: The Year's Best Science Fiction: Twenty-First Annual Collection
- Followed by: The Year's Best Science Fiction: Twenty-Third Annual Collection

The Year's Best Science Fiction: Twenty-Second Annual Collection is a science fiction anthology edited by Gardner Dozois, published in 2005. It is the 22nd in The Year's Best Science Fiction series. The anthology was published in the UK as The Mammoth Book of Best New Science Fiction: 18th Annual Collection.

== Contents ==
The book includes a 40-page summation by Dozois; 28 stories, all that first appeared in 2004, and each with a two-paragraph introduction by Dozois; and a referenced list of honorable mentions for the year. The stories are as follows:

- Pat Murphy: "Inappropriate Behavior"
- Benjamin Rosenbaum: "Start the Clock"
- David Moles: "The Third Party"
- Christopher Rowe: "The Voluntary State"
- Nancy Kress: "Shiva in Shadow"
- Paolo Bacigalupi: "The People of Sand and Slag"
- Michael F. Flynn: "The Clapping Hands of God"
- M. John Harrison: "Tourism"
- Terry Bisson: "Scout's Honor"
- James Patrick Kelly: "Men Are Trouble"
- Kage Baker: "Mother Aegypt"
- Vernor Vinge: "Synthetic Serendipity"
- Mary Rosenblum: "Skin Deep"
- Vandana Singh: "Delhi"
- Albert E. Cowdrey: "The Tribes of Bela"
- William Sanders: "Sitka"
- Daniel Abraham: "Leviathan Wept"
- Colin P. Davies: "The Defenders"
- Stephen Baxter: "Mayflower II"
- Caitlin R. Kiernan: "Riding the White Bull"
- Brendan DuBois: "Falling Star"
- Robert Reed: "The Dragons of Summer Gulch"
- James Cambias: "The Ocean of the Blind"
- Eleanor Arnason: "The Garden: A Hwarhath Science Fictional Romance"
- Peter F. Hamilton: "Footvote"
- Paul Di Filippo: "Sisyphus and the Stranger"
- Paul Melko: "Ten Sigmas"
- Walter Jon Williams: "Investments"
