= Charlie N. Holmberg =

American fantasy author

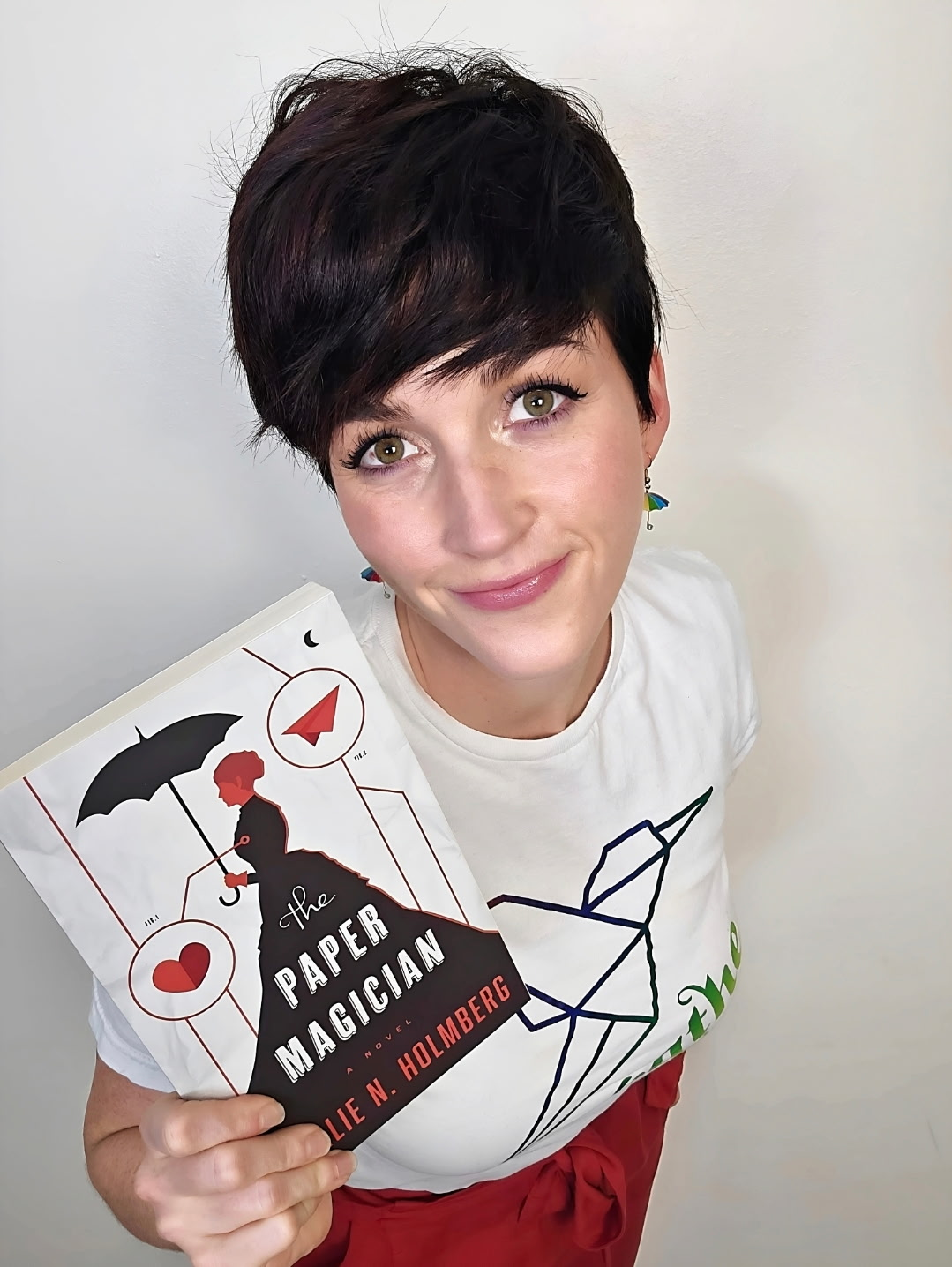
- Holmberg in 2024
- Born: April 4, 1988 (age 38); Salt Lake City, Utah, U.S.
- Education: Brigham Young University (BA)
- Occupation: Writer
- Children: 2
- Writing career
- Language: English
- Genres: Fantasy, romance, young adult
- Notable works: The Paper Magician series Spellbreaker series The Whimbrel House series The Shattered King series
- Notable awards: 2017 Whitney Award for Speculative Fiction 2020 Whitney Award for Speculative Fiction 2020 Whitney Award for Best Adult Novel 2022 Whitney Award for Speculative Fiction 2023 Whitney Award for Speculative Fiction 2024 Whitney Award for Speculative Fiction
- Website: charlienholmberg.com

Charlie Nicholes Holmberg (born April 4, 1988) is an American fantasy writer best known for The Paper Magician series. She is from Salt Lake City, Utah, and graduated from Brigham Young University with a bachelor's degree in English in 2010. Her first novel, The Paper Magician, was released in 2014. Holmberg expanded the book into a series, the film rights for which were purchased by Disney in 2016. In addition to her other book series (the Numina trilogy, Spellbreaker duology, Star Mother duology, and The Whimbrel House Series), Holmberg has published seven standalone novels. She is a multi-Whitney Award recipient for The Fifth Doll (2017), The Will and the Wilds (2020), Star Mother (2021), and Keeper of Enchanted Rooms (2022). The Hanging City was a 2023 Goodreads Choice Awards Finalist. Many of her other works have been nominated for literary awards as well. In addition to writing, Holmberg cohosts the podcast Your Mom Writes Books.

== Early life ==
Charlie Nicholes Holmberg was born in Salt Lake City, Utah, on April 4, 1988. She has three sisters. At a young age, she enjoyed watching Star Trek: The Next Generation and grew up a fan of Star Trek in general. After seeing an anime series entitled The Vision of Escaflowne when she was 13, Holmberg decided she wanted to write her own stories. She wrote fan fiction during her high school years. She played the French horn in her high school band, and first met her husband in band class.

She attended Brigham Young University (BYU), majoring in English (with a focus on creative writing) and minoring in editing. She took a class from fantasy author Brandon Sanderson while in college, and has cited that experience as helpful in her career. She graduated from BYU with a BA in English in 2010 and published a poem entitled "Aeos" in Leading Edge, BYU's science fiction and fantasy magazine, in December of that same year. Holmberg then worked as a technical editor and freelance editor for several years.

== Career ==
Holmberg chose to write fantasy over science fiction so that she wouldn't be bound by the limitations of technology in her world building or writing. Her debut novel, The Paper Magician, was published on September 1, 2014, by 47North, an imprint of Amazon. It was the ninth novel Holmberg completed and was listed on the American Library Association's 2015 shortlist for fantasy. The Paper Magician was also a finalist for the 2014 AML Award for Best Young Adult Speculative Fiction Novel. The book follows protagonist Ceony Twill as she becomes permanently bound to manipulating paper through magic. Holmberg decided to limit her characters in The Paper Magician to be able to manipulate only one man-made material after being taught by Brandon Sanderson that "limits are more interesting than the powers themselves". Holmberg was inspired, in part, by the art of origami in her idea for The Paper Magician. The novel was expanded into a series, including The Glass Magician (2014), The Master Magician (2015), and The Plastic Magician (2018). The Master Magician was featured as a Wall Street Journal Best-Selling Book (under fiction e-books) in June 2015. The complete series was optioned by Disney in 2016.

Holmberg has also written seven standalone novels, including The Hanging City, which was a finalist in the 2023 Goodreads Choice Awards in the romantasy category. She has described herself as "more of a standalone writer than ... a series writer". Her novel Followed by Frost was published in 2015, also by 47North. Followed by Frost originated as an idea Holmberg had while scraping snow off her car. The novel was nominated for a RITA Award for Best Young Adult Romance in 2016. Holmberg then came up with the concept for another standalone novel, The Fifth Doll (2017), while "preparing a class on magic systems for the LDStorymakers conference". The Fifth Doll won the 2017 Whitney Award for Speculative Fiction. Additionally, The Glass Magician, The Plastic Magician, Followed by Frost, Veins of Gold, and Smoke and Summons were all Whitney Award finalists. Veins of Gold made Barnes & Noble's list of "20 Favorite Indie Books of 2018" for its "hidden magic and ... historical western setting". It was called "a unique tale coupled with talented writing".

After being told by her agent that she needed to write another series, Holmberg published her Numina trilogy: Smoke and Summons, Myths and Mortals and Siege and Sacrifice. She pulled together different ideas she'd had previously to write the story. All three books were published in 2019, just months apart. Holmberg has called Smoke and Summons "the best book [she's] ever written". She has stated that "sometimes current pop culture trickles into [her] novels", and cited Downton Abbey and Stranger Things as examples. Her focus in writing is to enable the reader to "feel something". Holmberg has since added the Spellbreaker and Star Mother duologies to her published works and in 2024, released Boy of Chaotic Making, the third installment in the Whimbrel House series.

Holmberg was on the board of directors of Deep Magic, a quarterly science fiction and fantasy magazine. She interviewed Brandon Sanderson for issue 50 of Deep Magic, published in June 2016. She also hosts the podcast Your Mom Writes Books with author Caitlyn McFarland.

== Personal life ==
Holmberg currently lives in Utah County, Utah. In addition to the French horn, Holmberg plays the piano, flute, and ukulele. She and her husband have two children. She often writes in the mornings and takes care of her children in the afternoons. She enjoys reading fantasy novels by Brandon Sanderson, Juliet Marillier, Rosamund Hodge, Robert Jordan, and Martine Leavitt.

== Published books ==
=== The Paper Magician series ===
- The Paper Magician. 2014. ISBN 978-1-4778-2383-5.
- The Glass Magician. 2014. ISBN 978-1-4778-2594-5.
- The Master Magician. Amazon. 2015. ISBN 978-1-4778-2869-4.
- The Plastic Magician. 2018. ISBN 978-1-5039-5177-8.

=== Numina trilogy ===
- Smoke and Summons. 2019. ISBN 978-1-5039-0243-5.
- Myths and Mortals. 2019. ISBN 978-1-5420-4172-0.
- Siege and Sacrifice. 2019. ISBN 978-1-5420-9259-3.

=== Spellbreaker duology ===
- Spellbreaker. Amazon. 2020. ISBN 978-1-5420-2009-1.
- Spellmaker. Amazon. 2021. ISBN 978-1-5420-2257-6.

=== Star Mother duology ===
- Star Mother. Amazon. 2021. ISBN 978-1-5420-3046-5.
- Star Father. Amazon. 2022. ISBN 978-1-5420-3428-9.

=== Whimbrel House series ===
- Keeper of Enchanted Rooms. Amazon. 2022. ISBN 978-1-6625-0034-3.
- Heir of Uncertain Magic. Amazon. 2023. ISBN 978-1-6625-0869-1.
- Holmberg, Charlie N. (2024). Boy of Chaotic Making. Amazon. ISBN 978-1-6625-0873-8.
- Wizard of Most Wicked Ways. 2025.
- Lady of Uncanny Charms. 2026.

=== The Shattered King duology ===
- The Shattered King. 2025.
- The Half-Hearted Queen. 2026.

=== Standalones ===
- Holmberg, Charlie N. (2015). Followed by Frost. Amazon. ISBN 978-1-5039-4632-3.
- Holmberg, Charlie N. (2016). Magic Bitter, Magic Sweet. Amazon. ISBN 978-1-5039-3560-0.
- The Fifth Doll. 2017. ISBN 978-1-4778-0610-4.
- Veins of Gold. Mirror Press. 2018. ISBN 978-1-947152-22-9.
- The Will and the Wilds. 2020. ISBN 978-1-5420-0500-5.
- The Hanging City. 2023. ISBN 978-1-6625-0870-7.
- Still the Sun. 2024. ISBN 978-1-6625-1680-1.
- A Charm for Mythical Beasts. 2027. (Harper Voyager)
- Willow Vane. 2028. (Delacorte)

=== Non-fiction ===
- Charlie N. Holmberg's Book of Magic. November 12, 2024. (Oliver Heber Books)

=== Short stories ===
- "Salt and Water" (2015, reprinted 2016)
- "The War and the Riddle" (2018)
- "Illusions of Love" (2019)

== Awards and nominations ==
- Short-listed for the 2015 ALA Fantasy Reading List (The Paper Magician)
- Finalist for the 2015 Whitney Award for Young Adult Speculative Fiction (The Glass Magician)
- Finalist for the 2015 Whitney Award for Young Adult Speculative Fiction (Followed by Frost)
- Finalist for the 2016 RITA Award for Best Young Adult Romance (Followed by Frost)
- Winner of the 2017 Whitney Award for Speculative Fiction (The Fifth Doll)
- Winner of the 2020 Whitney Award for Speculative Fiction and Novel of the Year: Adult (The Will and the Wilds)
- Winner of the 2022 Whitney Award for Speculative Fiction (Star Mother)
- Finalist 2023 Goodreads Choice Award, Romantasy (The Hanging City)
- Winner of the 2024 Whitney Award for Adult Speculative Fiction (Keeper of Enchanted Rooms)
- Finalist 2026 Silver Falchion Awards
