= Randy Henderson =

Randy Henderson may refer to:

- Randy Henderson (writer)
- Randy Henderson (politician)
