= The Year's Best Science Fiction: Eighteenth Annual Collection =

2001 anthology edited by Gardner Dozois

- Editor: Gardner Dozois
- Language: English
- Series: The Year's Best Science Fiction
- Genre: Science fiction
- Publisher: St. Martin's Press
- Publication date: 2001
- Publication place: United States
- Media type: Print (hardcover & trade paperback)
- Pages: 617 pp
- ISBN: 9780312274658 (hardcover) ISBN 9780312274788 (trade paperback)
- Dewey Decimal: 354/.729/7250074
- LC Class: HV7685.B7 B76a
- Preceded by: The Year's Best Science Fiction: Seventeenth Annual Collection
- Followed by: The Year's Best Science Fiction: Nineteenth Annual Collection

The Year's Best Science Fiction: Eighteenth Annual Collection is a science fiction anthology edited by Gardner Dozois that was published in 2001. It is the 18th in The Year's Best Science Fiction series and won a 2002 Locus Award for best anthology.

== Contents ==
The book includes a 39-page summation of the year by Dozois, 23 stories that first appeared in 2000 (each with a two-paragraph introduction by the editor), and a seven-page referenced list of honorable mentions for the year.

The stories are as follows:

- John Kessel: "The Juniper Tree"
- Charles Stross: "Antibodies" (also collected in Toast: And Other Rusted Futures)
- Ursula K. Le Guin: "The Birthday Of the World" (also collected in The Birthday of the World and Other Stories)
- Nancy Kress: "Savior"
- Paul J. McAuley: "Reef"
- Susan Palwick: "Going After Bobo"
- Albert E. Cowdrey: "Crux"
- Severna Park: "The Cure For Everything"
- Peter F. Hamilton: "The Suspect Genome"
- Michael Swanwick: "The Raggle Taggle Gypsy-o"
- Lucius Shepard: "The Radiant Green Star"
- Alastair Reynolds: "Great Wall of Mars"
- Eliot Fintushel: "Milo and Sylvie"
- Brian Stableford: "Snowball In Hell"
- Stephen Baxter: "On the Orion Line"
- Greg Egan: "Oracle"
- Rick Cook and Ernest Hogan: "Obsidian Harvest"
- Tananarive Due: "Patient Zero"
- Charles Stross: "A Colder War"
- Steven Utley: "The Real World"
- M. Shayne Bell: "The Thing About Benny"
- Robert Charles Wilson: "The Great Goodbye"
- Ian McDonald: "Tendeléo's Story"
