= Fandemonium =

Fandemonium is a neologism coined by Van Miller. It may refer to:

- Fandemonium (publisher), a UK publishing company
- Fandemonium (comics), a story arc in the comic book series The Wicked + The Divine
- Fandemonium (convention), a convention that occurs in Nampa, Idaho
- Fandemonium (TV series), a reality-TV style program on MuchMusic
