= M. Shayne Bell =

American science fiction writer

- Born: Michael Shayne Bell; 1957 (age 68–69); Rexburg, Idaho, U.S.
- Education: Brigham Young University
- Occupations: Writer; editor; poet
- Writing career
- Years active: 1981-2003
- Genres: Science fiction; fantasy
- Notable awards: Writers of the Future (1986); AML Award (1993)
- Website: Official website

Michael Shayne Bell (born 1957 in Idaho) is an American science fiction writer, editor, and poet. He won the second quarter of the 1986 Writers of the Future contest with his story, "Jacob's Ladder". His short works have been nominated for the Hugo and the Nebula Awards. The Association for Mormon Letters awarded him for editorial excellence with his Washed by a Wave of Wind: Science Fiction from the Corridor anthology in 1994. Baen Books published Nicoji, a novel based on his short story of the same name, in 1991.

== Biography ==
Michael Shayne Bell was born in Rexburg, Idaho in 1957. He earned both a Bachelor's and a Master's degree (English Literature) from Brigham Young University. He served as a volunteer missionary in Brazil for the Church of Jesus Christ of Latter-day Saints. His first published work was "Earthlonging" in the first issue of The Leading Edge in April 1981. He published at least one story in each of the first fifteen issues of The Leading Edge, from 1981 until 1987. (Note: See the list of short fiction for specific stories and issues.) "Jacob's Ladder", won the first prize for the second quarter in the 1986 Writers of the Future contest. His 1989 poem, "One Hundred Years of Russian Revolution, 7 November 1917 to 7 November 2017: Novaya Moskva, Mars", was nominated for a Rhysling Award.

Baen Books published Nicoji in 1991, which remains his sole novel as of 2022. He was nominated for a Hugo Award for Best Short Story in 1995 for "Mrs. Lincoln's China", and nominated for a Nebula Award for Best Novelette in 2003 for "The Pagodas of Ciboure". He won an award for editorial excellence from the Association for Mormon Letters (AML) for Washed by a Wave of Wind: Science Fiction from the Corridor, a collection of science fiction short stories by people who lived or had lived in Utah. His 2000 story, "The Thing About Benny", was selected for The Year's Best Science Fiction: Eighteenth Annual Collection, and his 2003 story "Anomalous Structures Of My Dreams" was selected for The Year's Best Science Fiction: Twenty-First Annual Collection.

Bell worked for six years as the poetry editor for Sunstone Magazine. He holds a master's degree in English from Brigham Young University. He lives in Rexburg with his cats.

== Bibliography ==
- Nicoji (novel, January 1991, Baen, ISBN 0-671-72034-1)
- How We Play the Game in Salt Lake and Other Stories (collection, May 2001, iPublish, ISBN 0-7595-5006-9)
- Washed by a Wave of Wind as editor (anthology, February 1994, Signature Books, ISBN 1-56085-038-8)

=== Short fiction ===
- "Earthlonging" in The Leading Edge #1 (April 1981)
- "Deathwatch" in The Leading Edge #2 (November 1981)
- "Rachel" in The Leading Edge #3 (April 1982)
- "Hymrise" in The Leading Edge #4 (November 1982)
- "Incident at the Prancing Unicorn" in The Leading Edge #5 (1983)
- "Red Flowers & Ivy" in The Leading Edge #5 (1983)
- "A Witch's Christmas" in The Leading Edge #6 (January 1984)
- "Dark Between the Stars" in The Leading Edge #7 (1984)
- "Shadow Walker" (with Nancy Lynn Hayes, Jonathan Langford, and Lareena Smith) in The Leading Edge #7 (1984)
- "First Contact: A Play in One Act" in The Leading Edge #8 (Fall 1984)
- "Out of Azram" in The Leading Edge #9 (Winter 1985)
- "Jacob's Ladder" in The Leading Edge #10 (1985)
- "Road to Candarei" in The Leading Edge #11 (Winter 1986)
- "And the Stars Are Old" (Part 1 of 2) in The Leading Edge #12 (1986)
- "And the Stars Are Old" (Part 2 of 2) in The Leading Edge #13 (1987)
- "Lenin's Bones" in The Leading Edge #14 (Summer 1987)
- "Shaamek" in The Leading Edge #15 (1987)
- "Nicoji" in Asimov's Science Fiction (March 1988)
- "Bangkok" in Asimov's Science Fiction (July 1989)
- "Dry Niger" in Asimov's Science Fiction (August 1990)
- "Inuit" in Inuit (November 1991, Pulphouse Publishing, ISBN 1-56146-534-8)
- "Second Lives" in Asimov's Science Fiction (June 1992)
- "The Sound of the River" in Asimov's Science Fiction (December 1992)
- "Night Games" in Tomorrow Speculative Fiction (January 1993)
- "The King's Kiss" in Asimov's Science Fiction (March 1993)
- "The Shining Dream Road Out" in Simulations: 15 Tales of Virtual Reality, edited by Karie Jacobson (April 1993, Citadel Twilight, ISBN 0-8065-1406-X)
- "With Rain, and a Dog Barking" in Fantasy & Science Fiction (April 1993)
- "Soft in the World, and Bright" in Hotel Andromeda, edited by Jack L. Chalker (February 1994, Ace Books, ISBN 0-441-00010-X)
- "Naked Asylum" in Tomorrow Speculative Fiction (June 1994)
- "Mrs. Lincoln's China" in Asimov's Science Fiction (July 1994)
- "Drawing the Maps of Peace: The Moisture Farmer's Tale" in Tales from the Mos Eisley Cantina, edited by Kevin J. Anderson (August 1995)
- "Of the Day's Annoyances: Bib Fortuna's Tale" in Tales from Jabba's Palace, edited by Kevin J. Anderson (December 1995)
- "Of Possible Futures: The Tale of Zuckuss and 4-LOM" in Tales of the Bounty Hunters, edited by Kevin J. Anderson (1996, Bantam Books) ISBN 0-553-56816-7
- "Bright, New Skies" in Fantasy & Science Fiction (June 1997)
- "The Moon Girl" in Asimov's Science Fiction (June 1998)
- "Dogs, Stick People, Deer" in Between the Darkness and the Fire, edited by Jeffry Dwight (August 1998, Wildside Press, ISBN 1-880448-56-4)
- "Lock Down" in Starlight 2, edited by Patrick Nielsen Hayden (November 1998, Tor Books, ISBN 0-312-86184-2)
- "And All Our Banners Flying" in Fantasy & Science Fiction (April 1999)
- "How We Play the Game in Salt Lake" in Realms of Fantasy (April 1999)
- "Life Itself is Reason Enough" in Amazing Stories (September 1999)
- "At Bud Light Old Faithful" in Interzone (February 2000)
- "Homeless, with Aliens" in Science Fiction Age (March 2000)
- "The Thing About Benny" in Vanishing Acts, edited by Ellen Datlow (June 2000, Tor Books, ISBN 0-312-86962-2)
- "Balance Due" in Asimov's Science Fiction (December 2000)
- "Breaking Spells" in Realms of Fantasy (February 2001)
- "Refugees from Nulongwe" in Sci Fiction (April 2001)
- "Miss America at the Java Kayenko" in Fantasy & Science Fiction (July 2001)
- "Ragnarok of the Post-Humans: Final Transmissions, Sam 43 Unit 763" in Bones of the World, edited by Bruce Holland Rogers (September 2001, SFF Net, ISBN 0-9669698-4-7)
- "If On a Moonlit Night" in Realms of Fantasy (December 2001)
- "The Pagodas of Ciboure" in The Green Man: Tales from the Mythic Forest, edited by Ellen Datlow and Terri Windling (May 2002, Viking, ISBN 0-670-03526-2)
- "Flower Children of Mars" in Mars Probes, edited by Peter Crowther (June 2002, DAW Books, ISBN 0-7564-0088-0)
- "Anomalous Structures of My Dreams" in Fantasy & Science Fiction (January 2003)

=== Poetry ===
- "Dreamstone" in The Leading Edge #9 (Winter 1985)
- "Laundromat: Night" in The Leading Edge #11 (Winter 1986)
- "One Hundred Years of Russian Revolution, 7 November 1917 to 7 November 2017: Novaya Moskva, Mars" in Amazing Stories (September 1989)

== Reception ==
Chris Moriarty called Bell "one of the central figures in GLBT and AIDS-related science fiction", and Orson Scott Card called him "one of the most wise and decent human beings it's been my pleasure to know on this planet". Jonathan Langford, writing on the Association for Mormon Letters site, described Bell as "one of the best short fiction writers in the Mormon literary world" during the late 1980s and 1990s. He goes on to describe the writing as containing "deft craftsmanship, careful worlduilding, superb characterization, and heartwarming emotional impact".

=== Awards and honors ===
Bell has received the following awards and honors for his various works.

Year	Organization	Award title, Category	Work	Result	Refs
1986	Writers of the Future	2nd Quarter	"Jacob's Ladder"	Won	
1989	Readers of Asimov's Science Fiction	Asimov's Readers' Poll, Best Novelette	"Nicoji"	5	
1990	Science Fiction Poetry Association	Rhysling Award, Best Fantastic Short Poetry	"One Hundred Years of Russian Revolution"	Nominated	
1993	Association for Mormon Letters	AML Award, Editorial Excellence	Washed by a Wave of Wind	Won	
1993	Locus	Locus Award, Best Short Story	"The Sound of the River"	28	
1995	Readers of Asimov's Science Fiction	Asimov's Readers' Poll, Short Story	"Mrs. Lincoln's China"	6	
1995	Worldcon	Hugo Award, Best Short Story	"Mrs. Lincoln's China"	6	
1995	Locus	Locus Award, Best Short Story	"Mrs. Lincoln's China"	7	
2001	Gardner Dozois / St. Martin's Griffin	The Year's Best Science Fiction: Eighteenth Annual Collection	"The Thing About Benny"	Selected	
2003	Science Fiction Writers of America	Nebula Award, Best Novelette	"The Pagodas of Ciboure"	Nominated	
2004	Locus	Locus Award, Best Novelette	"Anomalous Structures of My Dreams"	30	
2004	Gardner Dozois / St. Martin's Griffin	The Year's Best Science Fiction: Twenty-First Annual Collection	"Anomalous Structures of My Dreams"	Selected	
