= Bram Stoker Award for Superior Achievement in a Middle Grade Novel =

Award for horror writing in novels

The Bram Stoker Award for Superior Achievement in a Middle Grade Novel is an award presented by the Horror Writers Association (HWA) for "superior achievement" in horror writing for middle grade novels. The HWA defines the category as being "intended for the age group 8-13, with word length beginning at 25,000 words". The award was first made in 2023, honouring works published in 2022.

== Winners and nominees ==
Bram Stoker Award for Superior Achievement in a Middle Grade Novel
| Year | Recipient | Title | Result | Citation |
|---|---|---|---|---|
| 2022 | Daniel Kraus | They Stole Our Hearts | Winner | |
| 2022 | Ally Malinenko | This Appearing House | Nominee | |
| 2022 | Delilah S. Dawson | Camp Scare | Nominee | |
| 2022 | Lora Senf | The Clackity | Nominee | |
| 2022 | Lisa Stringfellow | A Comb of Wishes | Nominee | |
| 2023 | Lora Senf | The Nighthouse Keeper | Winner | |
| 2023 | Sarah Henning | Monster Camp | Nominee | |
| 2023 | Diana López | Los Monstruos: Felice and the Wailing Woman | Nominee | |
| 2023 | Refe Tuma | Frances and the Werewolves of the Black Forest | Nominee | |
| 2023 | Suzanne Young | What Stays Buried | Nominee | |
| 2024 | Robert P. Ottone | There’s Something Sinister in Center Field | Winner (Tie) | |
| 2024 | Eden Royce | The Creepening of Dogwood House | Winner (Tie) | |
| 2024 | Mary Averling | The Curse of Eelgrass Bog | Nominee | |
| 2024 | Michaelbrent Collings | The Witch in the Woods | Nominee | |
| 2024 | Adrianna Cuevas | The No-Brainer’s Guide to Decomposition | Nominee | |
| 2025 | Delilah S. Dawson | Ride or Die | Winner | |
| 2025 | Meg Eden Kuyatt | The Girl in the Walls | Finalist | |
| 2025 | Ally Malinenko | Broken Dolls | Finalist | |
| 2025 | Ellen Oh | The House Next Door | Finalist | |
| 2025 | Ally Russell | Mystery James Digs Her Own Grave | Finalist | |
