= Wizardborn =

2001 novel by David Farland

- US hardcover edition
- Author: David Farland
- Cover artist: Darrell K. Sweet
- Language: English
- Series: The Runelords
- Genre: Epic fantasy
- Publisher: Tor Fantasy
- Publication date: March 14, 2001
- Publication place: United States
- Media type: Print (Hardback)
- Pages: 428
- ISBN: 0-312-86741-7
- OCLC: 45166656
- Dewey Decimal: 813/.54 21
- LC Class: PS3556.A71558 W59 2001
- Preceded by: Brotherhood of the Wolf
- Followed by: The Lair of Bones

Wizardborn is an epic fantasy novel by American writer David Farland, the third novel in his series The Runelords. It was published in 2001 by Tor Books.

== Plot introduction ==
Wizardborn is an epic fantasy novel set in a land where men can bestow to each other a number of endowments, granting the recipient of the endowment attributes such as increased strength, a more acute sense of hearing, or better eyesight. The novel combines traditional sword and sorcery elements of fantasy with its own unique magic system of endowments.

== Book divisions ==
- Book 9: Day 2 in the Month of Leaves - The Calm Between the Storms
- Book 10: Day 3 in the Month of Leaves - A Day of Mages

== Plot summary ==
After Raj Ahten attempts to murder the Earth King at the end of Brotherhood of the Wolf, his men turn on him and declare him a marked man in his own kingdom of Indhopal. Raj Ahten, fleeing the battlefield and struggling with wounds inflicted to him by Binnesman's wylde, encounters some of his flameweavers, who warn him that his earthly body is dying from the Earth's curse. However, Raj Ahten has no time to waste, as word reaches him that the Lord of the Underworld himself has arisen in Kartish, and he races off to defend his people.

Meanwhile, Gaborn and his companions rest in the nearby village of Balington until dawn, when they will give chase to the fleeing Reaver horde. Binnesman, sensing strong Earth powers within Averan, promptly begins to train her, as well as train his own wylde, Spring. Binnesman also does his best to heal the injured Sir Borenson, and Gaborn, upon learning of Averan's special powers, hatches a plan to track down and extract information from the Waymaker, the only Reaver that knows the underworld path to the One True Master of the Reavers.

While Erin Connal and Prince Celinor travel north to gain support for the Earth King, Gaborn and his company move south, attacking and harassing the Reavers whenever possible. Borenson and Myrrima travel south towards Inkarra, to seek out Daylan Hammer, the Sum of All Men, and to ask the Storm King Zandaros for aid.

In a final battle, Gaborn and his warriors defeat the remaining Reavers, sending the few remaining creatures scuttling back into the underworld. Averan finds the Waymaker and learns from him the path to the One True Master, afterwards agreeing to lead Gaborn to him. Raj Ahten, after a disastrous battle against the Reavers in his own nation of Indhopal, manages to slay the Reaver Fell Mage, but his own life fails him. In order to remain in the world of the living, he gives himself to the element fire, transforming into Scathain, Lord of Ash. Borenson and Myrrima are attacked by wights on their journey to Inkarra, and Myrrima apparently dies from her wounds. Stunningly though, she comes back from near death, and we learn that she is in fact a water wizard.

== Main characters ==
- Gaborn Val Orden
- Iome Sylvarresta
- Raj Ahten
- Averan
- Binnesman
- Spring
- Ivarian Borenson
- Myrrima Borenson
- Erin Connal
- Prince Celinor
- High Marshal Skalbairn
- Feykaald
- Jureem
- Waggitt
- Wuqaz Faharaqin
