= Barricade (2012 film) =

- Directed by: Andrew Currie
- Written by: Michaelbrent Collings
- Produced by: Michael Pavone
- Starring: Eric McCormack; Jody Thompson; Conner Dwelly; Ryan Grantham; Donnelly Rhodes; Dallas Blake
- Cinematography: Robert Aschmann
- Edited by: Peter Forslund
- Music by: Trevor Morris
- Production companies: WWE Studios (Barricade Productions, Inc.)
- Distributed by: WWE Studios
- Release date: September 25, 2012
- Running time: 82 minutes
- Country: Canada
- Language: English

Barricade is a 2012 Canadian psychological horror film directed by Andrew Currie. The film stars Eric McCormack. The film was released on September 9, 2012. It is the first film entirely produced by WWE Studios to not feature a wrestler in any way. It was widely panned by critics and audiences.

== Plot ==
Barricade tells the story of Terence Shade, a psychologist who doesn't have enough time in the day to spend with his kids. His wife wants them all to go to her old family cabin way, way, way up in the mountains to give the kids a white Christmas. The story jumps to a year later, and Shade's wife has died under mysterious circumstances, but he wants to honor her wishes and takes their two kids to the cabin. Once there, strange noises and shadows begin to terrorize the family ... or has madness overtaken them?

== Cast ==
- Eric McCormack as Terrance Shade
- Jody Thompson as Leah Slade
- Conner Dwelly as Cynthia Shade
- Ryan Grantham as Jack Shade
- Donnelly Rhodes as Sheriff Howes
- Dallas Blake as Deputy Dan
