= The Year's Best Science Fiction: Twenty-First Annual Collection =

2004 anthology edited by Gardner Dozois

- Editor: Gardner Dozois
- Language: English
- Series: The Year's Best Science Fiction
- Genre: Science fiction
- Publisher: St. Martin's Press
- Publication date: 2004
- Publication place: United States
- Media type: Print (hardback & paperback)
- Pages: 665 pp
- ISBN: 9780312324780 (hardcover) ISBN 9780312324797 (trade paperback)
- OCLC: 55801735
- Preceded by: The Year's Best Science Fiction: Twentieth Annual Collection
- Followed by: The Year's Best Science Fiction: Twenty-Second Annual Collection

The Year's Best Science Fiction: Twenty-First Annual Collection is a science fiction anthology edited by American writer Gardner Dozois, published in 2004. It is the 21st in The Year's Best Science Fiction series. The anthology was published in the UK as The Mammoth Book of Best New Science Fiction 17.

== Contents ==
The book includes a 28-page summation by Dozois; 29 stories, all that first appeared in 2003, and each with a two-paragraph introduction by Dozois; and an eleven-page referenced list of honorable mentions for the year. The stories are as follows:

- William Barton: "Off On A Starship"
- John Kessel: "It's All True"
- Charles Stross: "Rogue Farm"
- Steven Popkes: "The Ice"
- Nancy Kress: "Ej-Es"
- John Varley: "The Bellman"
- Judith Moffett: "The Bear's Baby"
- Howard Waldrop: "Calling Your Name"
- Kristine Kathryn Rusch: "June Sixteenth at Anna's"
- Walter Jon Williams: "The Green Leapard Plague"
- Paolo Bacigalupi: "The Fluted Girl"
- Jack Skillingstead: "Dead Worlds"
- Michael Swanwick: "King Dragon"
- Paul Melko: "Singletons In Love"
- M. Shayne Bell: "Anomalous Structures Of My Dreams"
- Vernor Vinge: "The Cookie Monster"
- Harry Turtledove: "Joe Steele"
- Geoff Ryman: "Birth Days"
- John C. Wright: "Awake In the Night"
- James Van Pelt: "The Long Way Home"
- Geoffrey A. Landis: "The Eyes Of America"
- Kage Baker: "Welcome To Olympus, Mr. Hearst"
- Robert Reed: "Night Of Time"
- William Shunn: "Strong Medicine"
- Dominic Green: "Send Me a Mentagram"
- Paul Di Filippo: "And the Dish Ran Away With the Spoon"
- Terry Dowling: "Flashmen"
- Nick DiChario: "Dragonhead"
- Terry Bisson: "Dear Abbey"
