= Scott Meyer (author) =

American novelist

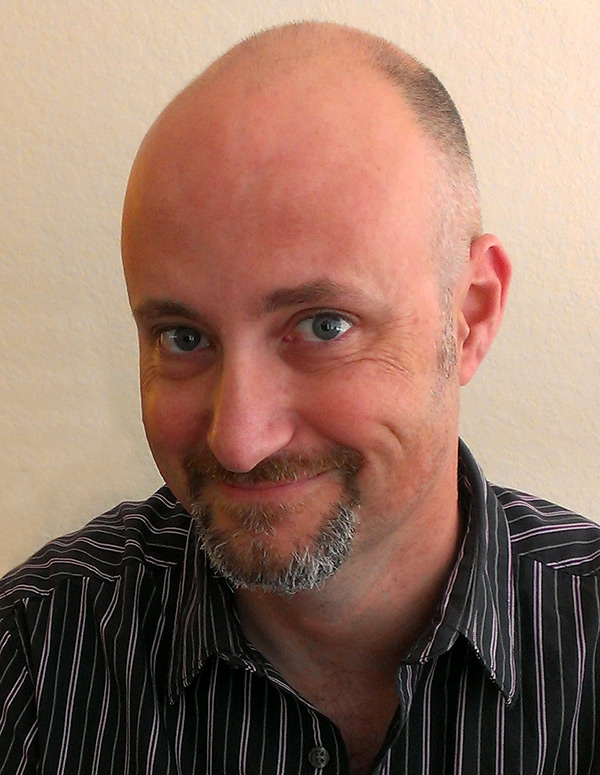
- Scott Meyer in 2014, taken by Missy Meyer
- Born: Scott Oscar Meyer; May 11, 1971 (age 55); Sunnyside, Washington, U.S.
- Occupation: Writer
- Writing career
- Period: 2003–present
- Genres: Science Fiction, Fantasy, Humor, Mystery
- Website: scottmeyer.rocks

Scott Oscar Meyer (born May 11, 1971) is an American author, comedian, and artist, known for his webcomic Basic Instructions and his comic fantasy series Magic 2.0.

== Basic Instructions ==
Meyer initially began posting Basic Instructions on his LiveJournal account in 2003, and on its own website basicinstructions.net in 2006. Strips were posted three times a week, Monday, Wednesday, and Friday. Each comic contained four panels in a grid, and each panel typically contains instructions as well as the standard comic drawings. In June 2015, Meyer announced that he would be stopping the production of Basic Instructions, and would start re-running older comics. On March 30, 2022, he posted a new, zombie-themed comic which teased his return and on April 1, 2022, he announced the comic's return and that it would update weekly.

The instructions were based on a "how to" topic seemingly taken from everyday life, such as "How to Lie for Recreational Purposes" or "How to Win at Monopoly Without Losing a Friend", and then dealt with the subject in a frequently perverse or unexpected manner. The characters in the comic were Scott Meyer himself and representations of the people he interacted with on a daily basis, such as his wife, his boss, and his best friend. The author has stated in interviews that many of the characters were based on real people.

Four books have been published, the first two by Dark Horse Comics, all containing compilations of strips with some new content, forewords written by the characters and commentary on the comics themselves. A page-a-day calendar featuring strips from the comic were printed from 2011 to 2014.

In August 2008 Dilbert creator Scott Adams covered Basic Instructions on his blog, where he discussed his interactions with Meyer and advice he had given him on possible syndication.

=== Basic Instructions Collections ===
- Help Is on the Way (2008, Dark Horse Books)
- Made with 90% Recycled Art (2010, Dark Horse Books)
- The Curse of the Masking-Tape Mummy (2011, Don't Eat Any Bugs Productions)
- Dignified Hedonism (2013, CreateSpace)

== Magic 2.0 ==
Magic 2.0 is a comic fantasy series of books written by Scott Meyer. The series so far consists of six novels, “Off to Be the Wizard”, “Spell or High Water”, “An Unwelcome Quest”, “Fight and Flight”, “Out of Spite, Out of Mind”, and "The Vexed Generation" which were published by publisher 47North. The series follows Martin Banks, a programmer from 2012, who uses a computer file that allows him to alter reality to time travel to medieval England where he joins a community of other computer programmers posing as wizards.

=== Novels ===
- Off to Be the Wizard (2013)
- Spell or High Water (2014)
- An Unwelcome Quest (2015)
- Fight and Flight (2017)
- Out of Spite, Out of Mind (2018)
- The Vexed Generation (2019)

The first 5 books are available in paperback, as kindle ebooks, as unabridged audiobooks, and on CD, performed by Luke Daniels, published by Brilliance Audio. Book 6 was initially exclusively released as an audible audiobook, with the paperback, ebook and audio book on CD released on 6 December 2019.

== Master of Formalities ==
2015 saw the release of a new series, the Science Fiction book Master of Formalities. It takes place in a distant future, where various planets are ruled by noble houses. The novel focuses on the planet Apios, which is ruled by the benevolent House Jakabitus, which is involved in a brutal war with the villainous Hahn Empire. Since planets have radically different cultures, masters of formalities are used to facilitate communications and keep things proper.

== The Authorities ==
The Authorities is the first novel in the series of the same name. it is a police procedural mystery novel series.

Novels

- The Authorities (2015)
- Destructive Reasoning (2022)

== Run Program ==
Run Program is about what can happen when artificial intelligence gets a mind of its own.

== Personal life ==
Scott lives and works near Phoenix, Arizona, with his wife Missy Meyer.
