= Michaelbrent Collings =

American novelist

- Education: University of Southern California Gould School of Law
- Occupations: Novelist, screenwriter, educator, speaker
- Relatives: Michael R. Collings
- Writing career
- Language: English
- Years active: 2010–present
- Genres: Horror, thriller, fantasy, science fiction, mystery, young adult literature, middle grade literature, humor, romance
- Website: writteninsomnia.com

Michaelbrent Collings is an American horror novelist. He wrote the screenplays for two horror films: Barricade (2012) and Darkroom (2013). He has self-published many novels, with three of his novels being finalists for the Bram Stoker Award in 2016 and 2025, three being finalists for the Whitney Awards in 2014 (Mystery/Suspense), 2017 (Young Adult Speculative), and 2024 (Middle Grade), and two being finalists for the Dragon Award, both for Best Horror, in 2020 and 2021.

== Writing ==
Collings grew up writing from an early age. His father, Michael R. Collings, taught creative writing professionally and taught Michaelbrent how to write creatively. He attended Pepperdine University, where his father taught. After being rejected by traditional publishers, Collings self-published Run on Amazon in 2010, where it became a bestselling e-book in multiple genres, despite Collings not marketing the book. His subsequent novels were not as successful, but Collings persisted and was able to support his family after publishing over twenty books. He started writing western romance novels under the pen name Angelica Hart in 2017. Collings used a pen name because friends and colleagues advised him that romance from a well-known horror writer who is a man would not be well-received. Collings later openly revealed that he was the author behind Angelica Hart.

Collings submitted multiple screenplays to the Nicholl Fellowships in Screenwriting, where four of his screenplays made it to the quarterfinals and semifinals. He had the most screenplays advance to the quarter and semifinals of any writer in the history of the competition. His success in the competition led to his screenplay for Barricade being produced into Barricade (2012). Working with the producers, he changed the original ending to be less dark. He also wrote the screenplay for Darkroom (2013).

He gave a workshop on writing horror and comedy at the 2018 St. George Literary Arts Festival. He spoke at the Winter 2019 Rexberg TEDx conference. He was a special guest at Idaho's Fandemonium in Nampa, Idaho in 2012.

In an interview with Joanna Penn, Collings discussed how he has major depressive disorder. He noted that not all writers are able to write something every day, but encouraged writers with depression to engage with stories during their depressive episodes to help them think about their writing, which is a process.

== Reception ==
Critical response to Collings' work has been generally positive, with his genre work receiving "Top 10 of the Year," 5-star and "A" ratings from various genre review magazines and websites. He has been featured in The Big Thrill, and his interview with The Creative Penn was named as one of “The 29 Best Self-Publishing Podcast Episodes of All Time.”

Ralph Peterson at the San Francisco Book Review gave Twisted four out of five stars, noting that "even the resolution does not lessen the creepiness." Publishers Weekly has also given excellent reviews of Collings' work, saying of Darkling Smiles, "These tense, unusual stories are as scary as they are satisfying" and of Stranger Still, "Collings delivers a gripping, visceral horror novel in this standalone sequel."

The Longest Con was a finalist for a Whitney Award in 2017, and was named as one of "9 Incredible Paranormal Mysteries & Thrillers" by Wiki.evid.com

The Deep was a finalist for the Bram Stoker Awards in the novel category in 2016; The Ridealong was also a finalist in the Young Adult Novel category the same year; the latter was the first time any indie novel was a finalist in that category. The books were published in 2015. In 2025, his novel Grimmworld: The Witch in the Woods was a finalist for the Bram Stoker Award, making him one of the few novelists to be a finalist for every age category for the Bram Stoker Award. His This Darkness Light was a finalist for a Whitney Award in the speculative fiction category in 2014, and he was nominated again for his novels Light-years From Home and Grimmworld: The Witch in the Woods. As with the Bram Stoker Award, Collings has been nominated in every age category for the Whitney Awards (General/Adult, Young Adult, and Middle Grade).

Scavenger Hunt was a finalist for the Dragon Award in the Best Horror Novel category in 2020 and Synchronicity was a finalist in the same category in 2021.

== Personal life ==
Collings is a member of the Church of Jesus Christ of Latter-day Saints. He served a mission in Paraguay from 1993 to 1995. Collings was a construction contract dispute litigator before becoming a writer. One of Michaelbrent's children died, which inspired some of his fiction. He and his wife had four children in 2015.

== Bibliography ==
Series information comes from the website "Book Series in Order."

=== The Stranger books ===
- Strangers (2014)
- Stranger Still (2020)
- Stranger Danger (2020)

=== Billy books ===
- Messenger of Powers (2010)
- Seeker of Powers (2012)
- Destroyer of Powers (2014)

=== Colony books ===
- Genesis (2013)
- Renegades (2013)
- Descent (2013)
- Velocity (2014)
- Shift (2014)
- Buried (2015)
- Reckoning (2015)

=== Fairy Tales books ===
- How Flowers Came to Be (2010)
- Leon (2010)
- The True Story of the Easter Bunny (2013)

=== Order of Sword Chronicles ===
- Child of the Empire (2015)
- Child of Sorrows (2016)
- Child of Ash (2019)

=== Baxter Homestead Romances (as Angelica Hart) ===
- Not All Cowboys Are Cruel (2017)
- Found in Flight (2017)
- The Mountain Man's Love (2017)
- The Lawman's Love (2017)
- For Love of the Brave (2019)

=== Standalone novels ===
- Run (2010)
- Rising Fears (2010)
- Mr. Gray (2011)
- The Loon (2011)
- Celestia (2011)
- Stolen (2011)
- The Stranger Inside (2011)
- Perdition (2011)
- The Haunted (2012)
- Apparition (2012)
- Hooked: A True Faerie Tale (2012)
- Blood Relations: A Good Mormon Girl Mystery (2013)
- Darkbound (2013)
- Strangers (2013)
- Killing Time (2013)
- Crime Seen (2014)
- The Darkness Light (2014)
- Twisted (2014)
- The Ridealong (2015)
- The Deep (2015)
- The House That Death Built (2016)
- The Longest Con (2016)
- The Darklights (2017)
- Peter and Wendy: A Tale of the Lost (2018)
- Predators (2018)
- Terminal (2019)
- Darkling Smiles (2019)
- Scavenger Hunt (2019)
- Stranger Still (2020)
- The Forest (2020)
- Synchronicity (2021)
- Malignant (2021)

=== Short story collections ===
- Darkling Smiles (2019)
- Future Tense: Tales of Apocalyptic Vision (2022)

=== Collaborations and collections ===
- Space Eldritch II (2013)
- The Black Fang Betrayal (2014)
- This is the End 3 (2014)

=== Short stories/novellas ===
- Kindled (2014)

=== Non-fiction ===
- California Construction Law and Public Contracting in California: A Primer in How Not to Get Screwed (2010)
- The Art of Teaching Martial Arts (2011)
- Mormons and Horror: Light Within Dark (2017)
