= On My Way to Paradise =

1989 novel by Dave Wolverton

- Author: Dave Wolverton
- Language: English
- Publication date: 1989

On My Way to Paradise is a science fiction novel by American writer Dave Wolverton, published in 1989 by Bantam Books. It is set in the far future (circa 2300AD) depicting a man, Angelo Osic, who is running from an ever-changing and frightening world of war and politics.

The novel was based on a short story with the same title, which was awarded the L. Ron Hubbard Gold Award at the 1987 Writers of the Future contest.

== Plot ==
Osic is a morphogenic pharmacologist who tended in a booth in a feria in Gatun city, Panama. He is approached by a stranger, the woman Tamara Marian de la Garza, who requires him to regrow her right hand. The bloody stump on the end of her arm, signifying a traumatic amputation. It transpires that she is on the run from powerful political forces, the assassins of which attempt to kill her and Osic.

He flees from the Earth with Tamara who is in an incapacitated state. On board the orbital shuttle, he attempts to get employment with a Japanese company, Motoki Corporation, as a Pharmacologist, but his application is rejected. Instead he is offered to fight as a mercenary for Motoki, who are attempting to gain control of the planet Baker, a satellite of the Delta Pavonis system. The story describes Osic's reaction to the intense battle training that takes place on board the starship Chaeron and his interaction with the mostly South American refugiados, and chimeras, genetically upgraded humans, who are also escaping their uncertain future on Earth.

Their arrival on Baker highlights the vast cultural differences between the mercenaries and their Japanese employers, who have trained them to fight a rival Japanese company of settlers, the Yabajin. These differences culminate in rebellion, with the mercenaries (now self described as Conquistadors) seizing the Motoki city, after a bloody battle and then setting out to attack the Yabajin settlement which lay 3,000 kilometers away. across forbidding deserts, encountering the wildlife of Baker.
