= 47North =

Imprint of Amazon Publishing for speculative fiction

- Parent company: Amazon Publishing
- Status: Active
- Founded: October 2011
- Country of origin: United States
- Headquarters location: Seattle, Washington
- Fiction genres: Fantasy, horror, science fiction
- Owner: Amazon
- Official website: amazonpublishing.amazon.com/47north.html

47North is a publishing imprint of Amazon Publishing, the publishing company of Amazon. It is the seventh imprint begun under the parent company Amazon Publishing, and publishes speculative fiction under three main genres: fantasy, science fiction, and horror. It launched in October 2011 with 15 initial books.

== History and publishing formats ==
In October 2011, Amazon Publishing announced its seventh imprint, 47North, named for the latitude of Seattle, where Amazon headquarters are. 47North is an imprint publishing novels and shorter stories in the fantasy, science fiction, and horror genres.

Some 47North works are released as Kindle Serials, a serial novel format where works are released in several episodes over a period of weeks. Readers purchase an ebook copy of the book once, and subsequent episodes are delivered at no additional cost. On the completion of the serial novel, it is re-released as a complete novel in ebook and print form.

== List of notable authors ==
Authors published via 47North include:

- Brett Battles
- Greg Bear
- Dana Cameron
- Dave Duncan
- Evan Currie
- Meg Elison
- Nicole Galland
- Lee Goldberg
- Charlie N Holmberg
- Kenneth Johnson (producer)
- Marko Kloos
- Mark Lawrence
- Seanan McGuire
- Scott Meyer
- William Rabkin
- Chris Roberson
- Ransom Stephens
- Neal Stephenson
- Mark Teppo
- Jeff Wheeler

== Submissions ==
Amazon Publishing does not accept unsolicited manuscripts.
