= Evan Currie =

Canadian writer

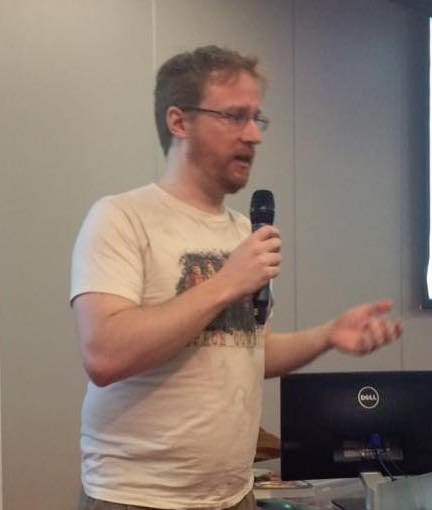
- Born: 3 June 1976 (age 50)
- Occupation: Writer
- Writing career
- Period: 2011–present
- Genre: Science fiction
- Notable work: Odyssey One

Evan C. Currie (born June 3, 1976) is a Canadian writer of space opera, military science fiction and techno-thriller novels. His books have been translated into Polish and German.

Currie has a post-secondary education in computer sciences and has worked in the local lobster industry steadily over the last decade.

== Works ==
=== Odyssey One series ===
Main series:

- Into the Black (2011)
- The Heart of Matter (2012)
- Homeworld (2013)
- Out of the Black (2014)
- Warrior King (2016)
- Odysseus Awakening (2017)
- Odysseus Ascendant (2018)
- King's Fall (2022)

After the Odyssey Sequel to the series

- The Seeds that were Sown (2023)
- Harvest (2025)

Odysseus Path Sequel to the series

- Once and Future (2026)

Star Rogue Tie in series

- King of Thieves (2015)

Archangel One Tie in series

- Archangel One (2019)
- Archangel Rising (2020)
- Imperial Gambit (2022)

Holy Ground Tie in series (prologue)

- Holy Ground (2021)
- Infamy(2024)

=== The Scourwind Legacy series ===
- Heirs of Empire (2015)
- An Empire Asunder (2016)

=== Hayden War series ===
- On Silver Wings (2011)
- Valkyrie Rising (2011)
- Valkyrie Burning (2012)
- The Valhalla Call (2013)
- By Other Means (2014)
- De Opresso Liber (2016)
- Open Arms (2017)
- Border Wars (2019)
- Among Enemies (2021)
- Storm Warning: Insurgent (2024)

=== Atlantis Rising series ===
- Knighthood (2017)
- The Demon City (2018)
- Risen (2021)

=== Superhuman series ===
- Superhuman (2018)
- Superhuman: Countdown to Apocalypse (2018)
- Superhuman: Semper Fi (2019)
- Heroic: The Golden Age (2021)

=== Imperium of Terra series ===
- I Was Legion (2020)
- Legion In Exile (2022)
- Legion Forever, Forever Legion (2025)

=== Other ===
- Thermals (2011)
- Steam Legion (2012)
- SEAL Team 13 (2013)
