= The Lair of Bones =

2003 novel by David Farl

- US Hardcover Edition
- Author: David Farland
- Cover artist: Darrell K. Sweet
- Language: English
- Series: The Runelords
- Genre: Epic fantasy
- Publisher: Tor Fantasy
- Publication date: November 2003
- Publication place: United States
- Media type: Print (Hardback)
- Pages: 464
- ISBN: 0-7653-0176-8
- OCLC: 52519086
- Dewey Decimal: 813/.54 21
- LC Class: PS3556.A71558 L35 2003
- Preceded by: Wizardborn
- Followed by: Sons of the Oak

The Lair of Bones is an epic fantasy novel by American writer David Farland, the fourth in his series The Runelords. It is the final book in the saga's original story arc.

== Plot introduction ==
The Lair of Bones is an epic fantasy novel set in a land where people can bestow to each other a number of endowments, granting the recipient of the endowment attributes such as increased strength, a more acute sense of hearing, or better eyesight. The novel combines traditional sword and sorcery elements of fantasy with its own unique magic system of endowments.

== Book divisions ==
- Book 11: Day 4 in the Month of Leaves - A Day of Descent
- Book 12: Day 5 in the Month of Leaves - The Darkness Deepens
- Book 13: When True Night Falls

== Plot summary ==
In order to save mankind and all life on Earth, Gaborn is charged by the Earth to descend into the underworld and confront the One True Master, ruler of the Reavers. Taking Binnesman, Averan, and Iome with him, he seeks the Lair of Bones in the heart of the Reavers' home. As he descends, Gaborn's powers grow as he takes many endowments, vectored through his dedicates. Gaborn and his companions follow the trail of the previous Earth King, Erden Geboren, to its furthest, and when attacked by Reavers, they are forced to leave Binnesman behind and press on without him.

Meanwhile, Borenson and Myrrima venture into Inkarra in search of Daylan Hammer, only to be captured and brought before King Zandaros. The forces of Raj Ahten, fresh off their victory over the Reavers, march north to Carris once more. Erin and Celinor meet Celinor's father, King Anders, who claims to be the new Earth King after Gaborn's loss of power, and they are forced to follow him south into Mystarria. During all this, mysterious earthquakes and countless falling stars herald the very world's shifting in the heavens, as the chaotic forces of destruction seek to unmake the Earth, as the One True Master attempts to bind the Rune of Desolation with the Runes of the Inferno and the Heavens.

When Averan is captured by a Reaver, Gaborn has no choice but to leave Iome behind and press forth on his own. Eventually, he reunites with Averan, Iome, and the wylde, and he begins slaying dedicate Reavers of the One True Master. Meanwhile, Borenson and Myrrima escape Inkarra with the help of a Days named Sarka Kaul. They race towards Carris, where they find the city fortified beyond belief in anticipation of another attack by Reavers, this horde making the last look small in comparison. Also near Carris are the massed armies of Raj Ahten, Queen Lowicker of Beldinook, and King Anders of South Crowden. Right before the Reaver attack, Binnesman arrives at Carris to aid his fellow men for one last time.

In the underworld, while Averan attempts to destroy the Rune of Desolation, Gaborn battles the One True Master. With the battle raging at Carris, Gaborn, with aid from the Earth, the wylde, and Glories and with Iome slaying dedicate vectors to the One True Master, is able to defeat the Reaver queen, and Averan, instead of destroying the Rune of Desolation combines it with the four other heavenly runes, creating a perfect rune to heal the Earth.

With the One True Master's host dead, the remaining Reavers at the Battle of Carris flee to the underworld, and the Earth transports Gaborn, Iome, and Averan to the battlefield. Raj Ahten, seeing his chance to finally kill Gaborn, rejects the Earth King's guidance and is subsequently struck by an ensorcelled arrow, shot by Myrrima. Before he can recover, Raj Ahten is attacked by dozens of Runelords, who hack his body to pieces and throw him in the river, killing the man and drowning the fire spirit within him. With the Earth no longer in danger, peace comes over the land. Iome births her and Gaborn's child, a son named Fallion, and Gaborn travels the land in service to the Earth. The year is now longer by one day, which Gaborn names Brotherhood Day.

== Main characters ==
- Gaborn Val Orden
- Iome Sylvarresta
- Raj Ahten
- Averan
- Binnesman
- Spring
- Ivarian Borenson
- Myrrima Borenson
- Erin Connal
- Prince Celinor
- King Anders
- Feykaald
- High Marshal Chondler
- Sarka Kaul

== Critical reception ==
According to Publishers Weekly, the book is "full of rich and brilliant descriptions, but not always making much sense", comparing it to a hallucination.
