= Sam Longoria =

American film director (born 1956)

Sam Longoria (born March 12, 1956, in Renton, Washington, United States) is a Hollywood producer-director and visual effects engineer. He produces independent feature movies, (digital and 35mm and 65mm film), and serves as writer, director, actor, editor and cinematographer.

Longoria began making movies in 1970 at the age of 14. He made a feature-length 35 mm film in Enumclaw, Washington, moved to Hollywood in 1978, with occasional film and theatre work in Portland, Oregon, New York, and Chicago.

Longoria's Hollywood work (frequently uncredited) begins in the 1980s, as a member of the technical crew on films such as Ghostbusters, 2010, Return to Oz, and Captain EO.

In 1985, he photographed President Ronald Reagan in the White House for a large-format film documentary. In 1992, he created 35 mm projected backgrounds from small-format film and video elements, for Peter Sellars's production of Paul Hindemith's Opera Mathis der Maler, at London's Royal Opera House, Covent Garden. In the 1990s, Longoria built camera electronics for the 1994 film Terminal Velocity, optically enlarged Charlie Sheen and Martin Sheen's Super 8 mm home movies for the 1999 film Five Aces, and performed hydraulic special effects on the 1997 film Dante's Peak, which had the largest water dump (650,000 gallons, weighing 5.4 million pounds) in cinema history.

From 1985 to 1994, Longoria Produced six live stage comedy shows a week, a Russian Drama, and two successful comedy radio shows, in Hollywood at The WILD SIDE Theatre. He loves Improv, and uses it in his shows and films.

In 1998–2001, he helped out in the studio with his friends' "The Firesign Theatre" comedy recordings, and attended the Grammy Awards in 1998 and 2002 to root for their nominated discs. He is credited as "Mascot," and "Nuts and Berries."

Since 2001, he splits his year, working both in Hollywood and Seattle. Longoria is a member of the Visual Effects Society and the Masquers Club in Hollywood, and focuses now on making his own films.
