= Leading Edge (magazine) =

Speculative fiction magazine

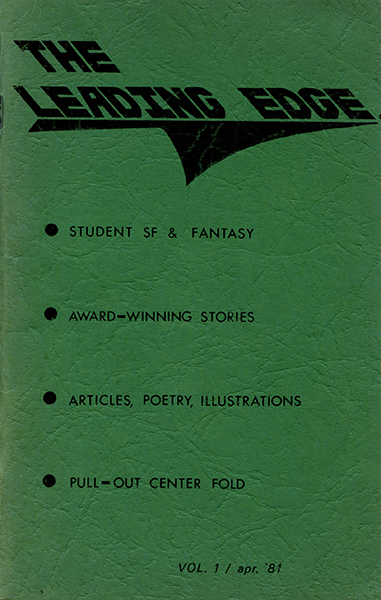
- Scan of the cover of the first issue of The Leading Edge from April 1981.
- Managing Editors: Hayley Brooks; Adam McLain; Heather White
- Former editors: Leah Welker
- Categories: fantasy, horror, poetry, science fiction, book reviews
- Frequency: Biannual
- Founded: April 1981
- Company: Brigham Young University
- Country: United States
- Based in: Provo, Utah
- Language: English
- Website: leadingedgemagazine.prod.brigham-young.psdops.com
- ISSN: 1049-5983

Leading Edge, formerly The Leading Edge Magazine of Science Fiction and Fantasy, is a semi-professional speculative fiction magazine first published in April 1981 and published at Brigham Young University in Provo, Utah. The magazine is known for its high quality fiction and has published stories by authors such as Dave Wolverton, M. Shayne Bell, Dan Wells, and Orson Scott Card, articles by Algis Budrys, as well as poetry and articles by poet and literary critic Michael R. Collings. Several former Leading Edge staff members (such as Brandon Sanderson) have become speculative fiction authors in their own right. Other notable former staff members include Anne Sowards, senior editor at Roc Books and Ace Books, and literary agent Michael Carr.

The magazine has also featured award-winning artwork, including the 2002 Chesley Award-winning cover artwork by James C. Christensen for issue 41.

It is published twice yearly and has an open submission policy. One of its goals is to aid new writers by providing substantially more detailed feedback than is common in the SF publishing industry.

== History ==
The roots of Leading Edge and other science fiction efforts at Brigham Young University (BYU) began with a one-day symposium on science fiction held on January 20, 1976. Four years later, Orson Scott Card gave a speech at the university about morality in writing, which showed some of the students and faculty that a serious, academic forum for discussion of science fiction writing was a possibility at BYU, but there weren't enough students interested in trying to make things work at that time.

This changed in February 1982 when Ben Bova was invited to speak at a university forum event. The department in charge assigned Marion Smith, the professor whose name is now part of the title of the Life, the Universe, & Everything symposium, to take care of Bova while he wasn't speaking. He and a handful of his writing students (including M. Shayne Bell) got together and held a discussion with Bova. This inspired those students to try to create something like that the following year, when they invited Card back to be the first guest of honor. The magazine was started by those same students, all members of a 1980 creative writing class at BYU.

By the late 1980s and early 1990s, a new crop of young writers and editors had taken the helm at The Leading Edge, many of whom would go on to professional success. These included several Writers of the Future winners such as Russell Asplund, Grant Avery Morgan, and Lee Allred, future editor at Ace Books, Anne Sowards, writer and literary agent Michael Carr, and fantasy writer Brandon Sanderson.

Since its beginnings, Leading Edge has published approximately twice a year (sometimes more, sometimes less), with one issue coming out in fall and one coming out in spring.

In 2000, Leading Edge published a story that turned out to have been plagiarized by a prison inmate submitting it as his own work. Geoffrey A. Landis' 1994 novella "The Singular Habits of Wasps", originally published in the April 1994 issue of Analog, was submitted by Phillip S. Barcia, purchased by Leading Edge, and published in issue 39. A correction notice was published in issue 40 indicating the actual author of the story.

As of January 2026, Leading Edge has published 87 issues.

== See also ==
- Inscape, a semiannual creative writing journal at BYU which publishes student submissions
