= Scott Nicholson =

American novelist

- Born: 1962 (age 63–64)
- Occupations: Writer, screenwriter
- Writing career
- Period: 2000–present
- Genres: Horror fiction, speculative fiction

Scott Nicholson (born June 24, 1962) is an American novelist specializing in horror or thrillers, often set in rural Appalachia. His debut, The Red Church, was a finalist for the Bram Stoker Award.

== Thank you for the Flowers ==
The anthology Thank you for the Flowers was a collection of 13 short stories in which Nicholson merges "the macabre with science fiction and fantasy tales loaded with everything from biting satire to fluffy sentamentalism." In a review in The Dispatch, some of Nicholson's work constituted "a seeming glorification of metaphor". This collection featured the award-winning short story Vampire Shortstop.

Nicholson wrote stories that were included in Eden Studios's zombie anthologies edited by James Lowder.

== The Farm ==
Nicholson's book The Farm was his fifth thriller, and was based around his experiences near his home in North Carolina. In an interview with The Times News, Nicholson noted that his fascination with Appalachian religions and goats influenced him in the writing of the book. In the article, Nicholson was quoted as saying:

"The core of the story is the relationship between the mother and daughter," Nicholson said. "Then these weird things start happening because she was into drugs. I kinda wanted her to be an outsider coming in to the little mountain community, being rebellious, going overboard, being really defiant so she could stand out. Because she's so weird she doesn't think anyone will believe her when things start happening with the goats. ... The situation is pulling them apart instead of drawing them together to deal with it."

== They Hunger ==
In an interview with The Times News Nicholson described the book as "Deliverance with vampires".

== After and Next ==
After is a post-apocalyptic series. A massive solar storm erases the world's technological infrastructure and kills billions. While the remaining humans are struggling to adapt and survive, they notice that some among them have changed. The Next series is a sequel in the same world, 5 years later.

== Prizes ==
- 1999 – Vampire Shortstop won the Writers of the Future L. Ron Hubbard Gold Award.

== Bibliography ==
=== Novels ===
- The Red Church, 2002
- The Harvest, 2003
- The Manor, 2004
- The Home, 2005
- The Farm, 2006
- They Hunger, 2007
- Disintegration, 2010
- Drummer Boy, sequel to Red Church, 2010
- After #1 : The Shock, 2014
- After #2 : The Echo, 2014
- After #3 : Milepost 291, 2014
- After #4 : Whiteout, 2014
- After #5 : Red Scare, 2015
- After #6 : Dying Light, 2015
- Next #1 : Afterburn, 2015
- Next #2 : Earth Zero, 2016
- Next #3 : Radiophobia, 2016
- Next #4 : Directive 17, 2016
- Next #5 : Crucible, 2016
- Next #6 : Half Life, 2017

=== Novellas ===
- After #0 : First Light, 2014

=== Short stories ===
- Scattered Ashes, 2008-Collection
- Thank You For the Flowers, 2000 – story collection
- "Heal Thyself" – appeared in the anthology Aegri Somnia
- "Unnatural Disasters", 2011-Collection

=== Comics ===
- Dirt, (forthcoming) 2009-Comic series
