= Randy Henderson (writer) =

American fantasy, urban fantasy writer

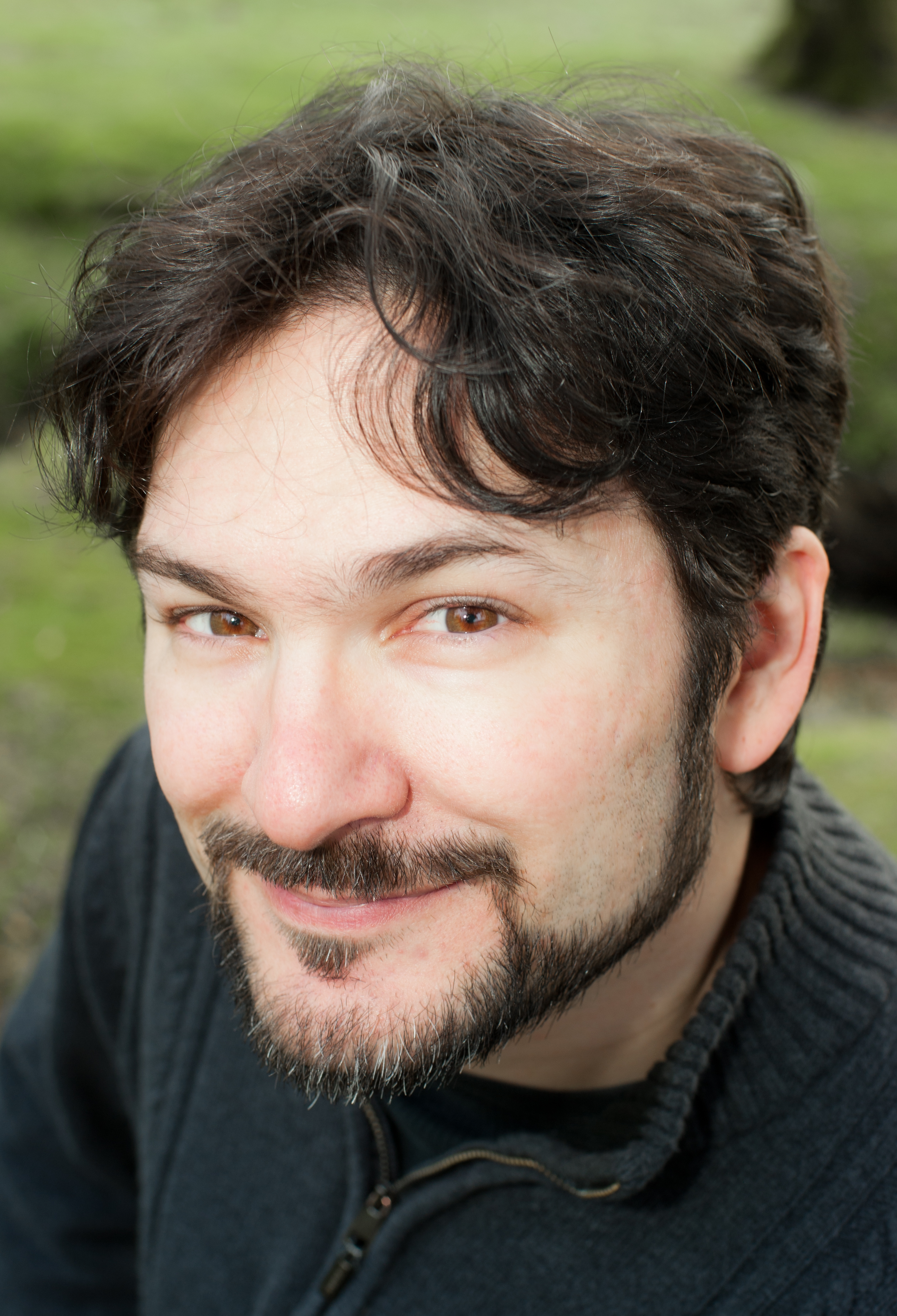
- Randy Henderson, February 2014
- Education: Clarion West Writers Workshop
- Occupation: Author
- Writing career
- Years active: 2009–present
- Genres: fantasy, urban fantasy
- Notable work: Finn Fancy Necromancy
- Notable awards: L. Ron Hubbard Writers of the Future Golden Pen, 2014
- Website: www.randy-henderson.com

Randy Henderson is an American fantasy, urban fantasy writer.

== Profile ==
Randy Henderson is a writer of the Future Golden Pen Award winner, and first place quarterly winner in 2014. He's an alumnus of Clarion West Writers Workshop, a member of SFWA and Codex, and has published short stories in Penumbra, Escape Pod, and Realms of Fantasy.

His urban fantasy series from TOR (US) and Titan (UK) includes Finn Fancy Necromancy, and Bigfootloose and Finn Fancy Free, and has been described as "dark and quirky".

== Bibliography ==
=== Novels ===
- Finn Fancy Necromancy (Tor) 2014
- Bigfootloose and Finn Fancy Free (Tor) 2015
- Smells Like Finn Spirit (Tor) 2017

=== Short stories, novellas and novelettes; short story collections ===
- A Witch’s Heart (short story, originally published in Realms of Fantasy) 2011
- Surviving the eBookalypse (short story, originally published in Escape Pod) 2012

=== Award nominations ===
- 2014 Memories Bleed Beneath the Mask" (short story) Writers of the Future 1st quarter: 2014 Hubbard
