= Albert E. Cowdrey =

American novelist (1933–2022)

- Born: December 8, 1933; New Orleans, Louisiana, U.S.
- Died: August 21, 2022 (aged 88)
- Education: Tulane University; Johns Hopkins University
- Occupations: Writer, historian
- Writing career
- Genres: Fantasy, science fiction, military history
- Notable awards: World Fantasy Award (2003)

Albert E. Cowdrey (December 8, 1933 in New Orleans, Louisiana – August 21, 2022) was an American author who wrote nonfictional historical studies and fantasy and science fiction literature. He was educated at Tulane University and Johns Hopkins University and worked for twenty-five years as a military historian, mostly in and around Washington, D.C. As a Chief of the Special History Branch in the U.S. Army, he wrote a number of books about the history of the medical branches of the army. He published the science fiction novel Crux and more than fifty short stories. Much of his short fiction appeared in Fantasy and Science Fiction and centered on his love for New Orleans, where he was born and raised. He is the only writer to receive awards from both the American Historical Association and the World Fantasy Convention.

In 2003 Cowdrey's short story "Queen for a Day" won the World Fantasy Award. His novella "The Overseer" received a nomination in the 2009 World Fantasy Awards. His novella "The Tribes of Bela" was a finalist for the 2005 Nebula Award.

== Bibliography ==
=== Short fiction ===
Stories

- The Familiar, (ss) F&SF Mar 1997
- White Magic, (nv) F&SF Mar 1998
- The Great Ancestor, (ss) F&SF Sep 1998
- Revenge, (ss) F&SF May 1999
- Tomorrow, (ss) F&SF Jun 2001
- Queen for a Day, (nv) F&SF Oct/Nov 2001
- Ransom [Crux], (na) F&SF Mar 2002
- The Posthumous Man, (ss) F&SF Jul 2002
- The Boy’s Got Talent, (nv) F&SF Sep 2002
- Grey Star, (ss) F&SF Jan 2003
- The Dog Movie, (ss) F&SF Apr 2003
- Danny’s Inferno, (ss) F&SF Dec 2003
- Rapper, (ss) F&SF Feb 2004
- Silent Echoes, (nv) F&SF Apr 2004
- A Balance of Terrors, (ss) F&SF Jul 2004
- The Tribes of Bela, (na) F&SF Aug 2004
- The Name of the Sphinx, (nv) F&SF Dec 2004
- The Amulet, (nv) F&SF Mar 2005
- Twilight States, (ss) F&SF Jul 2005
- The Housewarming, (ss) F&SF Sep 2005
- The Revivalist, (na) F&SF Mar 2006
- Imitation of Life, (ss) F&SF May 2006
- Animal Magnetism, (nv) F&SF Jun 2006
- Immortal Forms, (ss) F&SF Aug 2006
- Revelation, (ss) F&SF Oct/Nov 2006
- Murder in the Flying Vatican, (na) F&SF Aug 2007
- Envoy Extraordinary, (ss) F&SF Sep 2007
- The Recreation Room, (nv) F&SF Oct/Nov 2007
- The Overseer, (na) F&SF March 2008
- Thrilling Wonder Stories, (ss) F&SF May 2008
- Poison Victory, (nv) F&SF July 2008
- A Skeptical Spirit, (nv) F&SF Dec 2008
- Seafarer's Blood, (nv) F&SF Jan 2009
- The Visionaries, (ss) F&SF Jan/Feb 2016
- The Farmboy, (nv) F&SF Nov/Dec 2016
- The Legacy, (nv) F&SF July/Aug 2019
- Falling Angel, (nv) F&SF Jan/Feb 2020
- A Tale of Two Witches, (nv) F&SF Nov/Dec 2020
- This Land, This South: An Environmental History 1983

Title	Year	First published	Reprinted/collected	Notes
Crux	2000	Cowdrey, Albert E. (March 2000). "Crux". F&SF. 98 (3): 41–100.		Novella
Inside story	2008	Cowdrey, Albert E. (October–November 2008). "Inside story". F&SF. 115 (4&5): 7–28.		
The King of New Orleans	2001	Cowdrey, Albert E. (February 2001). "The King of New Orleans". F&SF. 100 (2): 103–116.		
Fighting For Life	1994	Cowdrey, Albert E. (1994). Fighting for life. Singapore: Free Press.		Nonfiction book about American military medicine during World War II
Mosh	2000	Cowdrey, Albert E. (December 2000). "Mosh". F&SF. 99 (6): 38–103.		Novella; see also Crux.
Nature 2000	2001	Cowdrey, Albert E. (April 2001). "Nature 2000". F&SF. 100 (4): 54–58.		
The stalker	2000	Cowdrey, Albert E. (August 2000). "The stalker". F&SF. 99 (2): 57–73.		
