= Writers and Illustrators of the Future =

Science fiction and fantasy story contest

- Sponsored by: Galaxy Press
- Date: 1985; 41 years ago
- Venue: Taglyan Grand Ballroom
- Country: United States
- Reward: Trophy + $5000
- First award: 1985
- Winners: List of winners

Highlights
- Golden Pen Award: Jack Nash (2024)
- Golden Brush Award: Tyler Vail (2024)
- Website: www.writersofthefuture.com

Writers and Illustrators of the Future is a science fiction and fantasy story and art contest that was established by L. Ron Hubbard in 1983 as Writers of the Future. A sister contest, Illustrators of the Future, was launched in 1988 and presents awards for science fiction art. Hubbard characterized the contest as a way of "giving back" to the field that had defined his professional writing life. The contest has no entry fee.

Notable past winners include Robert Reed, Dave Wolverton, Nancy Farmer, James Gardner, Scott Nicholson, Ian McHugh and Randy Henderson.

== Contest ==
=== Writers of the Future ===
In 1983, L. Ron Hubbard initiated the "Writers of the Future Writing Contest" with the first awards ceremony held in 1985. Since Hubbard's death in 1986 contests have been organized by the Scientologist organization Author Services Inc. under the trade name Galaxy Press.

The "Writers of the Future" contest is run quarterly and is open to authors who have no, or few, professional publications. The contest rules state that entrants cannot have had published "a novel or short novel, or more than one novelette, or more than three short stories, in any medium. Professional publication is deemed to be payment and at least 5,000 copies or 5,000 hits. Works that are less than 3,000 words and for which payment was less 6c/word do not count as "professional" publications. Stories of up to 17,000 words in length can be submitted to the contest. Poems, screenplays, non-fiction, etc., are not eligible.

Manuscripts are judged with the authors' names deleted and are separated out in quarterfinal and semifinal award rounds by the Coordinating Judge (previously K. D. Wentworth, Dave Wolverton in 2015, and originally Algis Budrys). Eight finalists are sent to a panel of professional science fiction writers, who determine the top three awards. Prizes are $1000 (first place), $750 (second) and $500 (third). The process is repeated quarterly. At the end of the contest year, the four quarterly first place stories compete for a separate annual grand prize, the "Gold Award," which includes an additional $5000. The first, second and third-place winners and often a selection of the other finalist stories are published annually, for which the writers receive additional compensation for publication rights. Thus, a grand prize-winning author can make over $6000 for a single story.

Some finalist stories not considered among the top three (in effect, the fourth or fifth placers) may be included in the annual anthology. These are called "published finalists." The writers were compensated for publication rights but are not considered winners and receive no prize money. They are eligible to re-enter the contest.

=== Illustrators of the Future ===
An artists' contest, the Illustrators of the Future, was added in 1988. Like the writers' contest, the illustrators contest is only open to amateurs/beginners. The rules state: "The Contest is open to those who have not previously published more than three black-and-white story illustrations, or more than one process-color painting, in media distributed nationally to the general public, such as magazines or books sold at newsstands, or books sold in stores merchandising to the general public. The submitted entry shall not have been previously published in professional media as exampled above."

Entrants submit a portfolio of three pieces of artwork, which are circulated among the judges. Up to three winners are selected every quarter, each given a prize of $500. Unlike the writers, the illustrators are not ranked. After the completion of the contest year, each of the twelve illustration winners is assigned one of the stories from among the twelve writer winners and given a month to return the finished illustration. A single grand prize, also called the Gold Award, is accompanied by a prize of $5000 - judging is based only on the final illustration, not the initial portfolio. While the art is judged according to standard artistic considerations (composition, draftsmanship, consistency of lighting, sense of wonder, facial expressions, etc.), a key consideration during the final judging is whether or not the art would make the viewer want to read the accompanying story. The art is also included in the annual anthology, and illustrators are additionally compensated.

=== Awards and workshop ===
No official tallies are given for the number of entrants in either contest, but it is believed that thousands enter the Writers contest every quarter, while only hundreds enter the illustration contest. Thus, the Illustration judges are sometimes often unable to find three deserving winners, and only pick one or two. Should the illustration winners number less than twelve in a year, each illustrator is - as usual - assigned a single story to illustrate for purposes of determining who wins the Gold Award. All winners and published finalists were invited to attend the annual week-long writers' and artists' workshops and awards gala at the invitation and expense of the contest administration. Various Hollywood actors are generally in attendance, in addition to prominent science fiction authors and artists. These include the present judges in addition to a famous and generally elderly writer given a Lifetime Achievement Award. While it is not required to attend the week-long festivities and seminars, it's thought by some that those in the running for the Gold Award may advance their cause by displaying professionalism and hard work at that time, judges for the contest, however, refute this.

== Judges ==
Many noted writers and artists have judged the awards or have won them themselves.

Notable writing judges have included: Kevin J. Anderson, Gregory Benford, Algis Budrys, Orson Scott Card, Brian Herbert, Nina Kiriki Hoffman, Anne McCaffrey, Larry Niven, Andre Norton, Frederik Pohl, Jerry Pournelle, Tim Powers, Brandon Sanderson, Robert J. Sawyer, K. D. Wentworth, and Jack Williamson.

Prominent art judges have included: Ciruelo Cabral, Edd Cartier, Echo Chernik, Leo and Diane Dillon, Bob Eggleton, Will Eisner, Frank Frazetta, Frank Kelly Freas, Stephen Hickman, and Stephen Youll.

== Winners ==
The following is a list of Grand Prize winners in each contest year. Stories by the grand prize winner, the quarterly top-three, and selected others ("published finalists"), are collected into an anthology each year. Winners and published finalists in the contest have included the writers Robert Reed, Dave Wolverton, Nancy Farmer, James Gardner, Scott Nicholson, Ian McHugh and Randy Henderson, and the artist Frank Wu.

Year	Author(s)	Work(s)	Illustrator(s)	Vol.	Anthology ISBN	Ref.
1985	Dennis Pimple	"Arcadus Arcane"		1	0-88404-170-0	
1986	Robert Reed	"Mudpuppies"		2	0-88404-254-5	
1987	Dave Wolverton	"On My Way to Paradise"		3	0-88404-245-6	
1988	Nancy Farmer	"The Mirror"		4	0-88404-314-2	
1989	Gary Shockley	"The Disambiguation of Captain Shroud"		5	0-88404-379-7	
1990	James Gardner	"The Children of Crèche"	Derek Hegsted	6	0-88404-504-8	
1991	James Glass	"Georgi"	Sergey Poyarkov	7	0-88404-641-9	
1992	Brian Burt	"The Last Indian War"	Evan T. Thomas	8	0-88404-772-5	
1993	Karawynn Long	"Adjusting the Moon"	Denis Martynec	9	0-88404-823-3	
1994	Alan Barclay	"Schrödinger’s Mousetrap"	Jana Komarek	10	0-88404-900-0	
1995	Julia H. West	"Sea of Chaos"	Dale Ziemianski	11	0-88404-999-X	
1996	Arlene C. Harris	"His Best Weapon"	Richard Moore	12	1-57318-027-0	
1997	Morgan Burke	"A Prayer for the Insect Gods"	Eric Williams	13	1-57318-064-5	
1998	Brian Wightman	"Nocturne’s Bride"	Paul Marquis	14	1-57318-154-4	
1999	Scott Nicholson	"The Vampire Shortstop"	Yuri Chari	15	1-57318-163-3	
2000	Gary Murphy	"Pulling Up Roots"	Frank Wu; Yana Yavdoshchook	16	1-57318-203-6	
2001	Meredith Simmons	"Magpie"	Andy B. Clarkson	17	1-57318-222-2	
2002	Dylan Otto Krider	"Eating, Drinking, Walking"	Irena Yankova Dimitrova	18	1-59212-052-0	
2003	Matthew Candelaria	"Trust Is a Child"	Mike Lawrence	19	1-59212-165-9	
2004	William T. Katz	"The Plastic Soul of a Note"	Laura Diehl	20	1-59212-177-2	
2005	John Schoffstall	"In the Flue"	Erik Valdez y Alanis	21	1-59212-217-5	
2006	Brandon Sigrist	"Life on the Voodoo Driving Range"	Eldar Zakirov	22	1-59212-345-7	
2007	Stephen Kotowych	"Saturn in G Minor"	Lorraine Schleter	23	978-1-59212-398-8	
2008	Ian McHugh	"Bitter Dreams"	Brittany J. Jackson	24	978-1-59212-374-2	
2009	Emery Huang	"Garden of Tian Zi"	Oleksandra Barysheva	25	978-1-59212-436-7	
2010	Laurie Tom	"Living Rooms"	Seth J. Rowanwood	26	978-1-59212-847-1	
2011	R. P. L. Johnson	"In Apprehension, How Like a God"	Irvin Rodriguez	27	978-1-59212-870-9	
2012	David Carani	"The Paradise Aperture"	Hunter Bonyun	28	978-1-61986-076-6	
2013	Tina Gower	"Twelve Seconds"	Aldo Katayanagi	29	978-1-61986-200-5	
2014	Randy Henderson	"Memories Bleed Beneath the Mask"	Trevor Smith	30	978-1-61986-263-0	
2015	Sharon Joss	"Stars That Make Dark Heaven Light"	Michelle Lockamy	31	978-1-61986-322-4	
2016	Matt Dovey	"Squalor and Sympathy"	Adrian Massaro	32	978-1-61986-502-0	
2017	Jake Marley	"Acquisition"	Michael Michera	33	978-1-61986-529-7	
2018	Darci Stone	"Mara's Shadow"	Kyna Tek	34	978-1-61986-575-4	
2019	Andrew Dykstal	"Thanatos Drive"	Aliya Chen	35	978-1-61986-604-1	
2020	C. Winspear	"The Trade"	Anh Le	36	978-1-61986-659-1	
2021	Barbara Lund	"Sixers"	Dan Watson	37	978-1-61986-701-7	
2022	Desmond Astaire	"Gallows"	Zaine Lodhi	38	978-1-61986-763-5	
2023	David K. Henrickson	"White Elephant"	Dao Vi	39		
2024	Jack Nash	"Son, Spirit, Snake"	Tyler Vail	40		
2025	Michael T. Kuester	"In Living Color"	Bafu	38	978-1-61986-900-4	

== Connections to Scientology ==
Cover of Volume 22 of the anthology series Writers of the Future, prominently featuring Hubbard's name

The original sponsor of the contest was Bridge Publications, Inc., the publishing arm of the Church of Scientology. Prior to the 2004 contest, the sponsorship moved to Author Services Inc. under the trade name Galaxy Press, which was spun off from Bridge to publish Hubbard's fiction and the contest anthologies.

The contest has also been characterized as a promotional vehicle for Hubbard himself, who returned to science fiction writing with Battlefield Earth at about the same time as he began the contest. On the covers of the annual WOTF anthologies, Hubbard's name appears prominently. The prominence of Hubbard's name and the lavish funding of the contest awards, publicity and ceremonies have led some to speculate that the contest is part of a campaign by the Church of Scientology to promote Hubbard's status in the science fiction and literary communities.

Entering or winning the contest does not appear to require or imply endorsement or membership in the Church of Scientology, and the contest itself has been endorsed by a wide range of well-known speculative fiction writers (see Judges and Winners above) who have no relationship to Scientology.

According to Director of the Writers and Illustrators Contests Joni Labaqui, the funds to underwrite the contest—including the cash prizes, the gala awards ceremony and the weeklong pre-awards festivities—come from the Hubbard estate. The Hubbard estate is separate from the Church of Scientology and earns royalties from sales of Hubbard's books, including his fiction. Labaqui also reports that staff of Author Services Inc. is entirely made up of Scientologists.

Records with the United States Patent and Trademark Office show that the rights to the Writers of the Future name were transferred from the L. Ron Hubbard estate ("Family Trust-B") to the Church of Spiritual Technology in 1989, and under the 1993 IRS closing agreement with the Church of Scientology, the L. Ron Hubbard estate became part of the Church of Spiritual Technology, a "Scientology-related entity".

== See also ==
- Author Services Inc.
- Bridge Publications (Scientology)
