= Dave Wolverton =

American speculative fiction writer (1957–2022)

- Wolverton in 2007
- Born: John David Wolverton; May 28, 1957; Springfield, Oregon, U.S.
- Died: January 14, 2022 (aged 64); St. George, Utah, U.S.
- Resting place: Tonaquint Cemetery, St. George, Utah
- Education: Brigham Young University
- Occupations: Writer, writing teacher
- Writing career
- Pen name: David Farland
- Period: 1985–2022
- Genres: Science fiction, fantasy, historical fiction
- Notable works: Runelords; The Courtship of Princess Leia; Nightingale; Ravenspell
- Website: www.davidfarland.com

John David Wolverton (May 28, 1957 – January 14, 2022), better known by his pen names Dave Wolverton and David Farland, was an American author, editor, and instructor of online writing workshops and groups. He wrote in several genres but was known best for his science fiction and fantasy works. He wrote 24 stories for the Star Wars franchise and 3 for the Mummy franchise. Books in his Runelords series were international bestsellers and hit the New York Times bestsellers list.

In 1987, he won the Writers of the Future contest. He was nominated for a Nebula Award in 1990. He died in the early morning of January 14, 2022. He lived in St. George, Utah, with his wife at the time of his death.

== Life and career ==
Wolverton was born May 28, 1957, (Note: Some sources give his birth date as May 15. His official obituary gives May 28.) in Springfield, Oregon to Jack and Lola Jean Wolverton. His family moved to a farm in Monroe when he was six years old, where he grew up and graduated from Monroe High School. Following graduation, he served a volunteer mission in Illinois for the Church of Jesus Christ of Latter-day Saints. Afterward, he attended Ricks College before transferring to Brigham Young University. He met his wife, Mary, there, and they married in the Provo Utah Temple on June 22, 1985. He and his wife had two daughters and three sons.

He began writing in 1985 during college, publishing the short story "The Sky Is an Open Highway" in the fall 1985 issue of The Leading Edge. Following that, he entered short stories into various contests, eventually winning first place in the 1987 Writers of the Future contest with the novella "On My Way to Paradise". The story was expanded into the novel of the same name, published in 1989 through Bantam Spectra. The novel was nominated for the Locus Award and Philip K. Dick Award.

He became a judge for the Writers of the Future contest in 1991 and was the Coordinating Judge and Editor at the time of his death. After co-editing volume 8 with Algis Budrys in 1992, he took over editing of the annual anthology from volume 9 until volume 14 before passing the role back to Algis Budrys. Wolverton again took over editing the anthology from K. D. Wentworth, beginning with volume 29 and continuing through volume 37.

His historical novel, In the Company of Angels, won the 2009 Whitney Award for best novel of the year, and was a finalist in the best historical novel category. Wolverton also received an outstanding achievement award at the 2009 Whitneys. In 2012, his young adult fantasy thriller Nightingale won the International Book Award for best Young Adult Novel of the Year, the Grand Prize at the Hollywood Book Festival, and the Southern California Book Festival for Best Young Adult Novel. It was also a finalist in the Global Ebook Awards. He has been nominated for other awards, including the Nebula Award in the Best Novelette category for his short story "After a Lean Winter".

In the summer of 1998, Dave Wolverton broke the world record for the largest single author book signing which he achieved with A Very Strange Trip, a book he wrote based on a story by L. Ron Hubbard. He wrote under his own name at the beginning of his career, changing to the pseudonym David Farland in the mid-1990s with the release of the first Runelords book. Wolverton chose the pseudonym in order to have a name more fitting for a Fantasy author and so his physical books would be shelved closer to customers' eye levels in bookstores, rather than on lower shelves as the last name Wolverton had.

Wolverton worked as an English professor of creative writing at Brigham Young University from 1999 to 2002, and held writing workshops for aspiring and established writers. The creative writing class he taught at BYU was taken over by one of his former students, Brandon Sanderson. He taught other writers such as Brandon Mull, Jessica Day George, Eric Flint, Stephenie Meyer, James Dashner, as well as others.

He worked in the gaming industry and greenlit screenplays in Hollywood. In 1998, Wolverton started working part-time at Saffire Studios, helping create video games. He was responsible for the concept of "lurkers" in the well-known RTS (Real-time strategy) game Starcraft: Brood War. In 2002, he began working as a movie producer and also greenlighted movies. He was working on a film adaptation of his Runelords series.

On January 13, 2022, Wolverton suffered from a fall, resulting in a severe head injury and a hemorrhagic stroke. He was on life support until he died early the next morning at the age of 64 in St. George, Utah. He was buried in the Tonaquint Cemetery in St. George, Utah. At the time of his death he was known to be working on three books: A rewrite of 2011's Nightingale, a new Runelords installment titled A Tale of Tales, and a fourth book in his Ravenspell series titled S.W.A.R.M.

== Bibliography ==
The Runelords

- The Sum of All Men (also released as The Runelords) (April 1998, Tor Books, ISBN 0-312-86653-4)
- Brotherhood of the Wolf (May 1999, Tor Books, ISBN 0-312-86742-5)
- Wizardborn (March 2001, Tor Books, ISBN 0-312-86741-7)
- The Lair of Bones (November 2003, Tor Books, ISBN 0-765-30176-8)
- Sons of the Oak (November 2006, Tor Books, ISBN 0-765-30177-6)
- Worldbinder (September 2007, Tor Books, ISBN 0-765-31665-X)
- The Wyrmling Horde (September 2008, Tor Books, ISBN 978-0-7653-1666-0)
- Chaosbound (October 2009, Tor Books, ISBN 978-0-7653-2168-8)
- A Tale of Tales (forthcoming)

Serpent Catch
Originally released as two books:

- Serpent Catch (May 1991, Bantam Spectra, ISBN 0-553-28983-7)
- Path of the Hero (April 1993, Bantam Spectra, ISBN 0-553-56129-4)

Rereleased as four books under his Farland pseudonym:

- Spirit Walker (March 2014, WordFire Press, ISBN 978-1-61475-157-1)
- Serpent Catch (April 2014, WordFire Press, ISBN 978-1-61475-159-5)
- Blade Kin (April 2014, WordFire Press, ISBN 978-1-61475-161-8)
- Path of the Crushed Heart (April 2014, WordFire Press, ISBN 978-1-61475-163-2)

The Golden Queen
Originally released as by Wolverton, later as by Farland:

- The Golden Queen (August 1994, Tor Books, ISBN 0-312-85656-3)
- Beyond the Gate (August 1995, Tor Books, ISBN 0-312-85770-5)
- Lords of the Seventh Swarm (February 1997, Tor Books, ISBN 0-312-85771-3)

An omnibus was also released as by Farland. A related short story was also released:

- Worlds of the Golden Queen (June 2005, Tor Books, ISBN 0-765-31315-4)
- "Saint Orick" in Raygun Chronicles: Space Opera for a New Age edited by Bryan Thomas Schmidt (December 2013, Every Day Publishing, ISBN 978-0-9881257-5-9)

Ravenspell
A middle-grade fantasy series.

- Of Mice and Magic (2005, Covenant, ISBN 1-57734-918-0)
- The Wizard of Ooze (2007, Covenant, ISBN 978-1-59811-354-9)
- Freaky Flyday (2015, David Farland Entertainment, ISBN 978-1-61475-810-5)

Star Wars

- The Courtship of Princess Leia (May 1994, Bantam Spectra, ISBN 0-553-08928-5)
- The Rising Force (June 1999, Scholastic, ISBN 0-590-51922-0)
- The Hunt for Anakin Skywalker (February 2000, Scholastic, ISBN 0-439-10143-3)
- Capture Arawynne (March 2000, Scholastic, ISBN 0-439-10144-1)
- Trouble on Tatooine (April 2000, Scholastic, ISBN 0-439-10145-X)
- The Ghostling Children (January 2001, Scholastic, ISBN 0-439-10142-5)

L. Ron Hubbard Presents Writers of the Future Wolverton edited the following anthologies:

- Volume VIII with Algis Budrys (1992, Bridge Publications, ISBN 0-88404-772-5)
- Volume IX (1993, Bridge Publications, ISBN 0-88404-823-3)
- Volume X (May 1994, Bridge Publications, ISBN 0-88404-900-0)
- Volume XI (June 1995, Bridge Publications, ISBN 0-88404-999-X)
- Volume XII (May 1996, Bridge Publications, ISBN 1-57318-027-0)
- Volume XIII (October 1997, Bridge Publications, ISBN 1-57318-064-5)
- Volume XIV (October 1998, Bridge Publications, ISBN 1-57318-154-4)
- Volume XXIX (June 2013, Galaxy Press, ISBN 978-1-61986-200-5)
- Volume 30 (February 2014, Galaxy Press, ISBN 978-1-61986-263-0)
- Volume 31 (May 2015, Galaxy Press, ISBN 978-1-61986-322-4)
- Volume 32 (May 2016, Galaxy Press, ISBN 978-1-61986-502-0)
- Volume 33 (April 2017, Galaxy Press, ISBN 978-1-61986-529-7)
- Volume 34 (April 2018, Galaxy Press, ISBN 978-1-61986-575-4)
- Volume 35 (April 2019, Galaxy Press, ISBN 978-1-61986-604-1)
- Volume 36 (April 2020, Galaxy Press, ISBN 978-1-61986-659-1)
- Volume 37 (November 2021, Galaxy Press, ISBN 978-1-61986-701-7)

== Selected awards and honors ==
Wolverton has been nominated for and won multiple awards for his various works.

Year	Organization	Award title, Category	Work	Result	Refs
1987	Writers of the Future	Fourth Quarter First Place	"On My Way to Paradise"	Won	
1987	Writers of the Future	Golden Pen Award	"On My Way to Paradise"	Won	
1990	Locus	Locus Award, Best First Novel	On My Way to Paradise	3	
1990	Locus	Locus Award, Best Science Fiction Novel	On My Way to Paradise	26	
1990	Philadelphia Science Fiction Society	Philip K. Dick Award	On My Way to Paradise	Honorable mention	
1997	Locus	Locus Award, Best Novelette	"After a Lean Winter"	14	
1997	Science Fiction and Fantasy Writers of America	Nebula Award, Best Novelette	"After a Lean Winter"	Nominated	
2005	Association for Mormon Letters	AML Award, Young Adult Literature	Of Mice and Magic	Honorable mention	
2008	LDStorymakers	Whitney Award, Best Speculative Fiction	The Wyrmling Horde	Finalist	
2009	LDStorymakers	Whitney Award, Best Historical Fiction	In the Company of Angels	Finalist	
2009	LDStorymakers	Whitney Award, Best Novel of the Year	In the Company of Angels	Won	
2009	LDStorymakers	Whitney Award, Outstanding Achievement	–	Won	
