= Crimson Bound =

Novel by Rosamund Hodge

First edition (publ. Balzer + Bray)

Crimson Bound is a fantasy novel inspired by Little Red Riding Hood and written by Rosamund Hodge. The book is set in a fae-dwelling land with Grimm-style magic and French names and inspired locations. "Crimson Bound" retells Little Red Riding Hood with a dark, magical twist.
