= The Runelords =

Fantasy book series by David Farland

The Sum of All Men, first novel of The Runelords series, featuring Prince Gaborn Val Orden and the spirit of the Earth King, Erden Geboren

The Runelords is a series of fantasy novels by American author David Farland, the first of which was published in 1997. In the universe of The Runelords, there exists a unique magical system which relies on the existence of distinct bodily attributes, such as brawn, grace, and wit. These attributes can be transferred from one individual (or animal) to another in a process known as "giving an endowment". Lords who have taken many endowments become extremely powerful, almost superhuman, and are known as Runelords.

== Novels of The Runelords ==
=== Earth King series ===
==== The Sum of All Men ====
Seeking the hand of the Princess Iome Sylvarresta, Prince Gaborn Val Orden is sidetracked when the Wolf Lord Raj Ahten invades the Kingdom of Heredon, seeking to rule all of Rofehavan.

==== Brotherhood of the Wolf ====
Raj Ahten and the forces of Rofehavan strike an uneasy alliance as they join forces to battle a Reaver invasion at the walled city of Carris.

==== Wizardborn ====
Following the Battle of Carris, Gaborn leads the troops of Rofehavan against the fleeing Reaver horde, while Raj Ahten returns to Indhopal to protect his own kingdom from a separate Reaver invasion.

==== The Lair of Bones ====
Gaborn Val Orden leads an expedition into the heart of the underworld to confront the One True Master of the Reavers, to decide in battle the fate of mankind and of the Earth itself.

=== Scions of the Earth series ===
==== Sons of the Oak ====
Nine years after the events of The Lair of Bones, Gaborn the Earth King finally succumbs to old age and passes on. In his wake, enemies of the Earth try to take control of the land, and Gaborn's eldest son Fallion, still only a child, must fight to protect his kingdom and his family.

==== Worldbinder ====
The sixth book of The Runelords was released in the US on 21 September 2007.

Fallion returns to Mystarria and is tricked into combining his world with another, when he tries to restore a sapling of the 'One True Tree' which has been cursed by Lady Despair. Areth Sul Urstone, the mirror world incarnation of Fallion's father, Gaborn val Orden, is being held captive in the wyrmling lair, with Lady Despair eventually taking human form by using Areth as her host.

Worldbinder was reviewed by Publishers Weekly, who praised its "dreamlike imagery", but noted that the plot was confusing and that the lack of details on its backstory may make new readers frustrated.

==== The Wyrmling Horde ====
The seventh book in the series was released on 16 September 2008.

Lord/Lady Despair tortures Fallion through many dedicates with a rune of compassion. Both sides vie for possession of the mountains of blood metal available on the combined world. Despair begins to accumulate new and evil accomplices from other worlds. Rhianna saves Fallion and the 'rescue party' by bypassing Despair's new found "Earth Sense", by not harming any wyrmlings during the rescue. Despair has 'Chosen' Fallion, and knows his whereabouts at all times. Vulgnash the death lord is sent by Despair to retrieve Fallion, and is confronted by the Wizard Sisel, who makes Vulgnash mortal and human rather than killing him. Fallion returns with Vulgnash to Despair in the wyrmling lair.

Publishers Weekly praised the landscapes and minor characters, while noting the violence and gloomy atmosphere of the book. Library Journal appreciated its storytelling, characters, and magic system.

==== Chaosbound ====
The eighth book in the series was released on 13 October 2009.

Borenson and Myrrima arrive back from Landesfallen following the binding of the worlds, at Ox Port, where they are hunted by the wyrmlings, but surreptitiously helped and protected by the local wyrmling leader, Crull-maldor, who hopes to aid Borenson/Aaath Ulber in his prophesied destruction of the emperor Zul-Torac, clearing the way for Crull-maldor to replace him as Lord Despair's side. The wight exacts vengeance on Borenson/Aaath Ulber after his successful, endowment aided, destruction of the wyrmling forces and lair, by murdering Myrrima.

== Legends and history ==
The universe of The Runelords is well fleshed out, populated by diverse beings, with rich backstories that assist the understanding of the events as described in the books.

=== Daylan Hammer – The Sum of All Men ===
There is a legend about the "Sum of All Men", a man with so many endowments and so beloved by the people that he became immortal and retained all of his endowments even after the deaths of his Dedicates. The strengths of the people supposedly flowed to him unrestrained, somehow without draining the dedicates themselves of the attributes. The books refer to Daylan of the Black Hammer as the Sum of All Men, although in the sixth novel it is revealed that Daylan is in fact a Bright One from the Netherworld, rather than a mortal man with many endowments. It is also revealed that Daylan has a mere four endowments of Brawn, in stark contrast to the legends which claim he has a huge number. Daylan himself claims to have started these legends, though his purpose for doing so has not been revealed.

=== The Earth King ===
Like the Sum of All Men, the Earth King is a legendary figure among all cultures. The first human Earth King, for there have been Earth Kings of many races, was a man named Erden Geboren, who united humanity using wizardly powers granted to him by the god-like force of Earth to protect his followers from the Toth and reavers. The Toth were eliminated, but the reavers survived. Geboren's nation was eventually split up after his death, and the royal families of most human nations are directly descended from his most trusted lieutenants and related to Geboren through intermarriage. It has become common for small, homemade dolls and icons of the Earth King to be placed at doorways during Hostenfest, an annual harvest festival, to invite the power and blessings of the Earth King into one's home.

The Earth King is commonly given immense power in magics wielded by the Earth Wardens, the common wizards of the Earth. He can sleep buried under soil and commune with the Earth in his dreams or may be granted the knowledge of previously unknown runes and spells. Earth Kings are also known to have the magical "Earth Sight," a gift which they can use to see across long distances or into the minds and souls of other people. Using this Earth Sight, they can judge who is worthy to save, and can Choose people. The Earth Kings sense danger approaching their Chosen, though do not know specifics, and can send telepathic warnings or other messages to their Chosen. The death of a Chosen is very painful to an Earth King. Legends say that Erden Geboren died without a single wound upon his body but with a heart broken from the swift deaths of many of his Chosen.

== Races and groups ==
The Runelords universe has a number of races and groups:

=== Duskin ===
Very little is revealed about the Duskin in the course of the series, though it is known they were great Earth-wizards and craftsmen. The Duskin were smaller than humans but bore a general resemblance to human shape, having the same number of limbs and being bipeds. Duskin dwelt beneath the surface of the earth, but in caverns much closer to the surface than their ancient rivals, the Reavers.

=== Humans ===
Humans are the dominant species of the surface world. They are identical to real humans, except they are not the first or only intelligent race to arise in the world. Humanity's survival has been placed at risk many times, just as other dominant species have been eliminated in the past.

Humans reside mainly upon one continent, though more exist throughout the world. They are divided principally into the Rofehavanish, the Indhopalese, and the Inkarrans. They have produced wizards of all kinds, while many other species only have one or two different kinds of wizards. Individually, a single human might have slim to no chance of standing against the monstrous might of creatures such as the Reavers. However, in numbers and through the magical granting of endowments, humans have learned to consolidate their strength and stand against other species that could otherwise destroy them. They are also the most technologically advanced of the extant species.

=== Reavers ===
Reavers are a massive species of subterranean creatures which bear no resemblance to any surface-dwelling creature. Reavers are somewhat like insects, communicating through scents and having various "castes" which perform different functions within their "hives", though they do not have a collective intelligence. They are unchallenged masters of the Underworld.

Reavers are incredibly hard to kill due to their vast size, armor-like skin and crystalline bones. The best way to slay a Reaver is to attack its brain through the mouth or the "sweet triangle", an area on the back of the Reaver's head where its bone-plates do not quite meet.

=== Toth ===
The Toth are an extinct race of sorcerers that were thought to be in some way related to the Reavers, though they were more vaguely humanoid and significantly smaller. The Toth were an expansionistic race and were slain by King Fallion of Mystarria when he led the massed armies of humanity across the Caroll Sea to the Toth homeland. The only surviving Toth take the form of wights, deadly ghost-like spirits which dwell in dangerous, wild places and bring icy death with their touch. Generally only Toth sorcerers remain as wights, their spirits presumably having been stronger than their non-magical fellows.

=== Nomen ===
Nomen are black-coated shaggy creatures that lumber on all fours in preference to an upright gait. They are crafty nocturnal hunters who prefer small packs to seeking prey alone. Their hands are clawed, and their eyes are red and seemingly glow in the dark. Nomen will drop on unwary travelers from a forest canopy rather than attempt a direct confrontation. They use basic weapons, favoring the spear most of all. Nomen can be found in the Dunwood and are said to inhabit the Hest Mountains beyond Inkarra in great numbers. In the distant past, they came north and invaded, but were slaughtered and their numbers greatly reduced.

=== Frowth Giants ===
Frowth giants are extremely large, standing roughly twenty feet tall and eight feet wide at the shoulders. They are covered in a matted yellow fur, and their faces are dominated by a long snout. Their huge size and strength makes them useful in labor and in combat. Frowth giants sometimes wear armor, and they carry huge iron-bound staves as weapons. With sharp teeth, they will kill or eat carrion if it is available. They have a limited ability for speech.

=== Ferrin ===
Ferrin are small, ratlike humanoids who live across the temperate world. Some live out in the wild, foraging for food and protecting their warrens, while many others live in human cities. Those who live in human cities often filch food and hunt rats. Most consider them a minor nuisance at best and vermin to be exterminated at worst. They are somewhat intelligent, though not as intelligent as humans. They have a very basic language and understand clothing and tools, including simple weapons.

=== The Days ===
The Days are an ancient order of historians whose goal is to follow and observe Kings and Runelords in order to record their actions for future generations. Each Days records the events of their charge via a mind link with another of their order, created by exchanging an endowment of Wit with another Days. The Days serve beings known simply as the Time Lords, although little has been discovered about these Time Lords as of yet.

While one Days follows their Lord, their counterpart lives in a monastery-type environment in the far north of Orwynne, kept away from anything other than their principal purpose, to compile the life journal of their chosen Runelord. The power of the Days order comes from knowing that at any given time they can find out what is happening to any particular noble at any place in the world. Therefore, should they wish to, the Days could influence events on a kingdom-wide scale. However, their service is completely focused upon observation, with a strict policy of noninterference – even in the face of cataclysmic war they would not act to save millions, nor would a Days stop to save a single drowning person. Rumors and legends abound, though, of some Days or another betraying his vows of noninterference and sharing knowledge with his lord. They also seem to use their knowledge to tear down lords who attempt to drive them away, sharing the lord's plans and secrets with his enemies.

The Days are easily identifiable by their simple brown robes.

Myrrima and the Wizard Binnesman are seen fighting a Darkling Glory on the cover of Brotherhood of the Wolf.

=== Knights Equitable ===
The Knights Equitable are an order of knights and force soldiers who have forsworn their loyalties to their kings and lords. Instead, they organize in a loose brotherhood under a High Marshal, and hold themselves to a general devotion to eliminate Wolf Lords and evil from the world. No man in the Knights Equitable is a "lord" to another in the order, though they do have ranks, which anyone may advance through by merit, not birth. Skalbairn was the High Marshal of the Knights Equitable through the Earth King series, and as their leader holds as much military power as some kings. They are also known as the Righteous Horde.

=== Wights ===
Wights are the spirits of the dead, often human, Duskin, or Toth. Many hide in wild, out-of-the-way places away from the sight of humans. Some, such as the Duskin and human wights of the Dunnwood, are largely harmless. Others, like the Toth wights in the bogs in the south of Mystarria, loathe humans and do not hesitate to attack them. The chill touch of a wight is a slow and painful death.

Existence as a wight provides something of a "living" afterlife upon the world. Many people of Rofehavan, as long as they love the land, may become one of the wights of the Dunnwood upon their death, reunited with lost loved ones.

=== Netherworld creatures ===
Several important creatures come from the Netherworld. They are intensely magical beings, of great power far surpassing anything in the normal world. Bright Ones are inhabitants of the Netherworld and are much mightier and wiser than mortal men. Glories are angelic beings of light, air, and fire that occasionally fight alongside humans, whereas Darkling Glories are Glories that serve destruction and evil. Loci are malevolent spirits which can possess the bodies of other beings.

== Countries ==
The human world of the Runelords is divided up into the three realms of Rofehavan, Inkarra, and Indhopal. Rofehavan, which dominates the northern half of the continent, is most like medieval Europe in culture. Indhopal, which takes up most of the southern half of the continent, is much like the historical Middle East, though with a wide variety of societies in the region. Readers see the least of Inkarra, a land hidden behind the Alcair Mountains to the east of Indhopal and south of Rofehavan. Inkarra is most similar to the Congo region of Africa, with jungles, exotic creatures, and humans that are seen as separate from the others (just as Africans were viewed as separate by both Middle Easterns and Europeans)

=== Rofehavan ===
The nations of Rofehavan are as follows:

- Alnick
- Ashoven
- Beldinook – ruled by King Lowicker
- Eyremoth
- Fleeds – a nation of plains, known for its fine, fast horses and nomadic clans, though perhaps the poorest nation of Rofehavan
- Haversind-by-the-Sea – an island nation off the east coast of the mainland, in the Caroll Sea
- Heredon – ruled by King Jas Laren Sylvarresta and Queen Venetta Moshan Sylvarresta; Heredon steel is some of the best in Rofehavan
- Internook – an island nation off the north coast of the mainland
- Lonnock
- Lysle – ruled by an upper class of merchant princes who win their station as much through wealth as anything else
- Mystarria – one of the richest and largest nations of Rofehavan, ruled by King Mandellas Draken Orden; known for its many Water Wizards and for the House of Understanding.
- North Crowthen
- Orwynne
- Seward
- South Crowthen – ruled by King Anders
- Toom

=== Indhopal ===
Indhopal dominates the southwest third of the continent, and much of it is known for its arid deserts. Other parts of Indhopal are rich and lush, covered in tropical rainforests. Raj Ahten has conquered all of Indhopal by the time the Runelords begins. The nations of Indhopal are as follows:

- Aven
- Bina
- Deyazz
- Dharmad
- Hawat
- Kartish – the farthest southern nation of Indhopal, known for its extremely rich blood metal mines
- Khuram
- Linah
- Muttaya
- Muyyatin
- Old Indhopal – the mightiest nation of the region, after which the region was named; the first nation Raj Ahten took rulership of
- Taif
- Tuulistan
- Umarish

=== Inkarra ===
On maps, a united realm, Inkarra is rife with kings great and small who constantly scheme for power and place. The greatest is the Storm King Zandaros, both the High King of Inkarra and perhaps the mightiest human Air Wizard. As High King, all other kings of Inkarra must pay tribute to Zandaros. The Inkarrans despise the Rofehavanish, who they call the Dayborn, considering them to be utter barbarians.

The border between Mystarria and Inkarra is a closed one, as some sixty years before, criminals and assassins crept across the border. Three such assassins were captured and executed outright, their bodies sent home as warning. Zandaros protested the executions and insulted the Mystarrians, and so a response was sent by skyrider that if the Inkarrans would not patrol the border and catch their own criminals, Mystarria could not be blamed for doing so themselves. Zandaros's own response to this message was to send the child skyrider's head back in a sack. Ever since, Rofehavanish from Mystarria have been forbidden to enter Inkarra on penalty of death, and Mystarria has forbidden any Inkarrans from ever entering the nation. Most other nations of Rofehavan tolerate Inkarran traders and traveling performers.

The Inkarrans call themselves the "Night Children" in their own language. They are a closely related offshoot of humanity, one that has become nocturnal. Skin and hair is often solid white, as are their "ice white" eyes, which can see perfectly in near total darkness. There are more than a few halfbreeds amongst the Inkarrans, called kutasarri in their language, who are often shunned because of their "Dayborn" appearance and night-blind eyes.

== Characters ==
=== Major characters ===
Darrell K. Sweet's illustration of Gaborn Val Orden, Iome Sylvarresta, and the young Averan, from the cover of The Lair of Bones

- Gaborn Val Orden – Prince of the Kingdom of Mystarria and the main character of the series.
- Raj Ahten – Often referred to as the Wolf Lord, King of all Indhopal. Raj Ahten has taken thousands of endowments making him an exceptionally powerful Runelord.
- Iome Sylvarresta – Princess of Heredon. Iome is Gaborn's love interest, is ever at Gaborn's side, and helps him in whatever ways possible throughout the novels.
- Ivarian Borenson – A powerful, skilled, and fierce warrior with red hair, bodyguard to Prince Gaborn Val Orden.
- Binnesman – An herbalist, wizard, and Earth Warden, Binnesman is first an advisor to King Sylvarresta and later to Gaborn Val Orden. Binnesman's goal is to protect mankind from extinction.
- Myrrima – A young woman who serves Gaborn Val Orden, wife of Ivarian Borenson.
- Averan – A young messenger and skyrider.
- Erin Connall – A young horsewoman of Fleeds, a powerful warrior.
- Prince Celinor – Son of King Anders of South Crowthen.

=== Second series characters ===
- Fallion Orden – Oldest son of Gaborn Val Orden.
- Jaz Orden – Youngest son of Gaborn Val Orden.
- Rhianna Connall – Daughter of Erin Connall.
- Talon Borenson – Daughter of Ivarian Borenson.

=== Minor characters ===
- King Jas Laren Sylvarresta – King of Heredon at the beginning of The Runelords.
- King Mendellas Draken Orden – King of Mystarria at the beginning of The Runelords.
- King Anders – King of South Crowthen.
- Feykaald – An advisor of Raj Ahten's.
- Jureem – An advisor of Raj Ahten's, devoted to serving.
- Roland Borenson – Father of Ivarian Borenson, who gave an endowment of metabolism to King Mendellas Draken Orden.
- Baron Poll – A fat lord forbidden from knowingly being within fifty leagues of Ivarian Borenson, due to a great feud between them in their youth.
- Spring – Binnesman's wylde, mighty and born in the shape of a beautiful woman.
- Saffira – Raj Ahten's favored consort in his harem, endowed with a glamour for each time Raj Ahten had lain with her, making her devastatingly beautiful.
- Skalbairn – High Marshal of the Knights Equitable.
- Duke Paldane – "The Huntsman," part of the Orden royal family and right-hand man to King Mendellas Orden, master of Carris and most of Mystarria's armies, Gaborn's uncle.
- Chemoise Solette – Iome's Maid of Honor; her father was a Knight Equitable who was captured by one of Raj Ahten's guards and forced to grant an endowment of grace.
- Storm King Aelgyr coly Zandaros – The High King of Inkarra and a mighty Air Wizard.
- Waggitt – A simpleton who slew a number of reavers at the great battle at Carris and was rewarded with an endowment of wit for his deeds, to make him the equal of any other man.
- Wuqaz Faharaqin – Leader of the Ah’kellah, he is a great warrior who was once in Raj Ahten's service. After Raj Ahten kills his nephew at Carris, Wuqaz swears revenge.
- Sarka Kaul – Days to the petty Inkarran king Criomethes, increasingly dissatisfied with his order's unbending policy of noninterference.

== Magic ==
The world of the Runelords has two major forms of magic, both based upon runes of power: elemental magic, and endowments. Wizards wield the elemental magics (air, earth, fire, and water), while anyone who knows the proper chants and songs (and uses them along with a rod called a "forcible", made of a particular special metal called "blood metal") can use the magic required to grant endowments.

=== Runes ===
Most works of magic require the use of runes. These symbols each carry power, some greater than others. Common people can use some of them to minor effect, though they are most powerful when created by wizards. For instance, anyone may draw runes of strength to make a stone keep durable, but those same runes drawn by a wizard will protect a fortress's walls for centuries.

=== Endowments ===
The main magical system of the series relies on a system of "endowments"—transferring attributes which are inherent to every living creature. These attributes are transferable to and from both man and animal. (Attributes can even be transferred between members of different species; so, for example, brawn or the sense of smell from a dog can be transferred to a man.) Once an individual gives an attribute to another, the giver (called a "dedicate") loses that particular attribute until the death of the recipient; and if the recipient dies, the attribute returns to the giver once again. Each person can only give one endowment in their lifetime. Attributes which can be endowed upon another include brawn (physical strength), grace (physical dexterity), wit (memory and clearness of thought), metabolism (speed at which the body's processes operate), glamour (physical beauty), voice (both volume and persuasiveness), stamina, sight, hearing, smell, touch, taste, talent, will (strength of will), bloodlust, and pain. Talent and will are more difficult to transfer and the means to do so are only known by the Inkarrans. Endowments of bloodlust and pain are perverse in nature and were devised by the one true master of evil to strengthen her troops and torture the humans, specifically Fallion.

==== How Endowment works ====
Endowments are transferred with special tools, called forcibles. A forcible is a rod cast of a rare material called blood metal, with its tip shaped with the rune corresponding to the endowment to be transferred. Files and other tools can be used to refine the shape of the cast rune any time after casting. The finished forcible resembles more than anything a small branding iron. The method of creating forcibles, and the supervision of their creation, is part of the duties of a special class of magician called a facilitator. When the forcible is ready, the facilitator invokes its power, which causes the instrument to glow. The facilitator touches the forcible to the dedicate, who experiences a brief burst of excruciating pain as they are branded. The instrument glows more brightly, and leaves trails of light when moved through the air. An expert facilitator can tell whether the endowment worked properly by examining the forcible and the light trails. If satisfied, he touches the instrument to the recipient, who receives the attribute along with a feeling of ecstasy and is also branded with the rune. The dedicate experiences the corresponding loss of that attribute. The forcible's virtue is expended by this process, and the forcible and its metal may not be reused.

==== Dedicates ====
A dedicate must give up his attribute willingly; the simple act of touching him with a forcible is not enough. However, unscrupulous Runelords can threaten a potential dedicate's friends and family to force cooperation. Some also purchase endowments; poor folk will sometimes become dedicates to gain that money for themselves or their families. Dedicates are normally selected from individuals whose attributes are strong; one selects a strong man to dedicate his brawn, a person with excellent vision to dedicate sight, and so forth.

==== Special characteristics of certain Endowments ====
- Not all attributes are alike; five are known as "greater endowments" which, with the exception of metabolism, can be deadly to give. They include brawn, grace, stamina, and wit. A man who gives strength might die because his heart no longer has the strength to beat, a man who gives "wit" in fact only gives the use of his memory, not his less tangible cerebral qualities such as reasoning or intuition. Despite this, a person who gives wit loses more than just their memory, they can die because they "forget" (how?) to breathe. Deaths after giving grace and stamina are less abrupt but all the more disturbing for that reason. A dancer who gives grace can find it difficult to even breathe and will likely be unable to eat anything but weak broth until either they or the recipient of their grace lives. With stamina any illness or injury they have when they give their stamina will never heal. They are like immuno-compromised chemotherapy patients and are liable to die from the slightest illness or injury. Metabolism is one of the least onerous endowments to give and the only greater endowment that will not risk the a pregnant woman's unborn child. The giver will generally fall in to a kind of suspended animation, no longer aging and needing only the barest of attention (perhaps none save a little water) to care for
- Individuals must be careful that their physical endowments, such as brawn and stamina, are balanced. For example a warrior can't take more than a handful of endowments of metabolism as the increased speed of movement and thought is not always matched by an increase in the speed of the liver and kidneys. To give many endowments of metabolism two endowments of stamina must be given for each one of metabolism. It should also be noted that while strength and stamina may increase the strength of bones and toughness of the skin is unchanged and so a man with many endowments of brawn may be strong enough to lift a horse but it might tear his body apart to try. Stamina is also required for those who have many endowments of sight (far seer's) lest the sun blind them in the day.

A balance of endowments will usually make for a better (more deadly) force soldier. A warrior with 10 endowments each of brawn, grace, stamina, and wit but no metabolism will be helpless against an opponent who has just 3 each of the greater endowments, including metabolism, as they will be unable to react to a lethal strike in time to defend themselves. The most cause of imbalance is the death of one or more dedicates, resulting in the loss of their attributes. Such individuals are sometimes referred to as "warriors of unfortunate proportion."

- Individuals endowed with metabolism move faster than ordinary men, but they pay a price: they age at the same proportion. A dedicate who provides metabolism sleeps until his lord dies, not aging at all. A dedicate who gives up metabolism requires virtually no caring for at all, other than a cat or rat terrier in the vicinity to ensure that the mice don't eat the flesh of the comatose dedicate.
- Individuals with large numbers of glamour and voice endowments can become so beautiful and so persuasive that men will obey them even when they know rationally that it is a poor idea.
- Two individuals who endow each other with wit become mentally linked. This is the basis of the Days' power. An individual endowed with wit learns much faster and remembers more than other men, but if his dedicates of wit die, then much of this knowledge disappears, as those memories are in fact stored in the others' brain(s). If he later receives additional endowments of wit, he must relearn what he once knew.

==== Vectoring Endowments ====
A dedicate can "vector" endowments, and is also thereafter referred to as "a vector" themselves. That is, they can receive one or more endowments of one particular attribute, and then dedicate that same attribute to another, who benefits from the endowment supplied by the vector and those supplied by all of that individual's dedicates. Each endowment requires space on the skin for the rune branded by the forcible; runelords who intend to acquire hundreds of endowments (such as Raj Ahten) must have them vectored from others because there isn't sufficient room on their bodies otherwise. There is also one other benefit to using a vector to gain endowments through them. A person with a dedicate also receives all endowments of the type vectored to them which are given to that same dedicate later; and, this happens regardless of the distance between the vector and the runelord. So, a runelord can receive an endowment from a person, leave, and at any time and distance, receive more endowments through that dedicate. In this way, facilitators can continue to vector endowments to a traveling runelord, without requiring their presence; facilitators, dedicates, and forcibles need not travel with the runelord or be found elsewhere during their travel. One disadvantage to using a vector, for the runelord, is that with that one vector's death, the runelord is suddenly deprived of all of the vector's collected endowments as they return to their original dedicates. With attempted assassination of dedicates being a common and expected tactic in conflict, this makes it all the more important to protect vectors well.
