= Fandemonium (convention) =

Multi-genre convention in Nampa, Idaho

- Status: Defunct
- Genre: Gaming, role playing, anime, general fandom
- Venue: The Grove Hotel
- Location: Boise, Idaho
- Country: United States
- Inaugurated: August 2004
- Attendance: 808 in 2012
- Organizer: Fandemonium Entertainment Group LLC
- Website: http://www.fandemonium.org/

Fandemonium Entertainment Group LLC
- Founded: October 2003
- Headquarters: Boise, Idaho
- Key people: Daniel "Borneo" Armstrong, Jamie Parker, Robert Wright
- Website: http://www.fandemonium.org

Fandemonium is one of southwest Idaho's sci-fi, anime, and gaming conventions, created to bring multi-genre conventions to Idaho. Held annually in Nampa, Idaho at the Nampa Civic Center, the convention takes place during the first full weekend of August. The convention has featured role-playing games such as Dungeons & Dragons and HârnMaster, cosplay groups and competitive contests for costume designs, collectible card games like Magic, the Gathering, computer games, and more.

== Events ==
Events held at the convention are produced by the attendees at the event. Attendees create events by requesting space and time slots months before the convention, and then they are given a space to run their panel, event, competition, and other activities.

- Cosplay and costume contests are common as photographers attend to take action shots and different cosplay group photos for their organizations.
- Dances and mini-events occur often at the will of the Random Games Staff at Fandemonium, where they have been known to throw in different events for audience pleasure.
- Stage performers and cosplay groups create productions just for Fandemonium each year and perform for audiences on stage.
- Concerts where local bands can come out and play for the attendees during the evenings.
- One of the largest boffer sword melees in the Treasure Valley occur at Fandemonium each year, as the Convention Chairman, Borneo, produces a class on creation and use of boffer swords and then holds a contest with anyone with safe weapons.

== Timeline ==
Event	Date	Location	Attendance
Fandemonium '04 - Behold the Power of Fandom	August 13–15, 2004	Red Lion Hotel Boise Downtown; Boise, Idaho	256
Fandemonium '05 - Never Give Up, Never Surrender	August 5–7, 2005	Nampa Civic Center; Nampa, Idaho	179
Fandemonium '06 - The World is Not Enough	August 4–6, 2006	Nampa Civic Center; Nampa, Idaho	320
Fandemonium '07 - Changing the World One Fan at a Time	August 3–5, 2007	Nampa Civic Center; Nampa, Idaho	478
Fandemonium '08 - Farewell to Mundane	August 1–3, 2008	Nampa Civic Center; Nampa, Idaho	680
Fandemonium '09 - We are Greater than Our Dreams	August 7–9, 2009	Nampa Civic Center; Nampa, Idaho	778
Fandemonium '10 - No Boundaries	August 7–9, 2010	Nampa Civic Center; Nampa, Idaho	771
Fandemonium '11 - Rise of the Fans	August 5–7, 2011	Nampa Civic Center; Nampa, Idaho	763
Fandemonium '12 - The World Ends at Fandemonium	August 3–5, 2012	Nampa Civic Center; Nampa, Idaho	808
Fandemonium '13 - A New Beginning	August 2-4, 2013	Nampa Civic Center; Nampa, Idaho	1030
Fandemonium '14 - Together We are Stronger	August 1-3, 2014	The Grove Hotel; Boise, Idaho	1302
Fandemonium '15 - Hope Reborn	August 14-16, 2015	The Grove Hotel; Boise, Idaho	931
Fandemonium '16 - The Fandom Family Picnic	August 21, 2016	Municipal Park; Boise, Idaho	420
Fandemonium '17 - Fight for the Future	August 14-16, 2017	Wyndham Boise Garden Airport Hotel; Boise, Idaho	TBA
