= 1987 in science fiction =

The year 1987 was marked, in science fiction, by the following events.

== Births and Deaths ==
=== Deaths ===
- Alfred Bester
- James Tiptree, Jr.

== Literary Releases ==
=== Novels ===
- 2061: Odyssey Three, by Arthur C. Clarke
- Consider Phlebas, by Iain M. Banks
- Dirk Gently's Holistic Detective Agency, by Douglas Adams
- Sphere (novel), by Michael Crichton

=== Comics ===
- Xenozoic Tales, aka Cadillacs and Dinosaurs, begins publication with Kitchen Sink Press

== Movies ==
- Predator, dir. by John McTiernan
- RoboCop, dir. by Paul Verhoeven
- The Running Man, dir. by Paul Michael Glaser
- Spaceballs, dir. by Mel Brooks

== Television ==
- Star Cops
- Star Trek: The Next Generation

== Video games ==
- Mega Man
- R-Type

== Awards ==
=== Hugos ===
- Best novel: Speaker for the Dead by Orson Scott Card
- Best novella: Gilgamesh in the Outback by Robert Silverberg
- Best novelette: "Permafrost" by Roger Zelazny
- Best short story: "Tangents" by Greg Bear
- Best related work: Trillion Year Spree by Brian W. Aldiss and David Wingrove
- Best dramatic presentation: Aliens, dir. by James Cameron; screenplay by James Cameron; Story by James Cameron and David Giler & Walter Hill; Based on characters created by Dan O'Bannon and Ronald Shusett
- Best professional editor: Terry Carr
- Best professional artist: Jim Burns
- Best semiprozine: Locus, ed. by Charles N. Brown
- Best fanzine: Ansible, ed. by David Langford
- Best fan writer: David Langford
- Best fan artist: Brad W. Foster

=== Nebulas ===
- Best novel: The Falling Woman by Pat Murphy
- Best novella: The Blind Geometer by Kim Stanley Robinson
- Best novelette: "Rachel in Love" by Pat Murphy
- Best short story: "Forever Yours, Anna" by Kate Wilhelm

=== Other awards ===
- Arthur C. Clarke Award: The Handmaid's Tale by Margaret Atwood
- BSFA Award for Best Novel: Grainne by Keith Roberts
- Locus Award for Best Science Fiction Novel: Speaker for the Dead by Orson Scott Card
- Saturn Award for Best Science Fiction Film: Robocop

== Other events ==
- 45th World Science Fiction Convention, held in Brighton, United Kkingdom
