= A Woman's Liberation =

2001 collection of stories edited by Connie Willis and Sheila Williams

- Cover
- Author: Connie Willis and Sheila Williams, editors
- Cover artist: Franco Accornero
- Language: English
- Genre: Science fiction
- Publisher: Warner Aspect
- Publication date: 2001
- Publication place: United States
- Media type: Print (paperback)
- Pages: 302 pp
- ISBN: 0-446-67742-6
- OCLC: 45917055
- Dewey Decimal: 813/.0876208352042 21
- LC Class: PS648.F4 W65 2001

A Woman's Liberation: A Choice of Futures By and About Women is a collection of science fiction stories edited by the author Connie Willis and Sheila Williams. Each story was originally published in Asimov's Science Fiction and/or Analog Science Fiction and Fact magazines.

== Stories ==
- Nancy Kress, Inertia
- Connie Willis, Even the Queen -- Won the Nebula Award in 1993
- Sarah Zettel, Fool's Errand
- Pat Murphy, Rachel in Love -- Won the Nebula Award in 1988
- Vonda N. McIntyre, Of Mist, and Grass, and Sand -- Won the Nebula Award in 1974
- S. N. Dyer, The July Ward
- Katherine MacLean, The Kidnapping of Baroness 5
- Octavia E. Butler, Speech Sounds -- Won the Hugo in 1984
- Anne McCaffrey, The Ship Who Mourned
- Ursula K. Le Guin, A Woman's Liberation

== Reception ==
Critical reception has been positive. Strange Horizons gave the anthology a positive review, writing "Generally, when I review anthologies, I find a few outstanding stories, a large number of good stories, and one or two clinkers. This anthology delivered ten outstanding stories -- not a clinker in the bunch." Publishers Weekly gave a more mixed but ultimately positive review, commenting that it "brings little new to the table, but it does assemble excellent work by sci-fi luminaries" and that it could be that the "familiarity of the stories in this anthology signals women's entrenchment in the genre."

The Women's Review of Books was also mixed, and stated that they felt that the pieces chosen were fairly random "as though any old works by women would do if they happened to be set on other planets. Stories that really tackle "liberation" are few and far between. Not many of the pieces go beyond the superficial." They also felt that it was rather tame in comparison to Maureen McHugh's Nekropolis, which had released around the same time.
