= Sheila Williams =

American science fiction editor (born 1956)

- Williams in the Asimov's Science Fiction offices, January 7, 2020
- Born: 1956 (age 69–70); Springfield, Massachusetts, U.S.
- Education: Elmira College (BPhil) Washington University in St. Louis (MPhil)
- Occupation: Editor
- Children: 2

Sheila Williams (born 1956) is an American science fiction editor who is the editor of Asimov's Science Fiction magazine.

== Early life and education ==
Sheila Williams grew up in a family of five in western Massachusetts. Her mother had a master's degree in microbiology. Williams’ interest in science fiction came from her father, who read Edgar Rice Burroughs books to her as a child. After studying at the London School of Economics in her junior year, she studied at and received a bachelor's degree from Elmira College in Elmira, New York. Williams received her Master's degree in philosophy from Washington University in St. Louis.

== Career ==
She became interested in Isaac Asimov's Science Fiction Magazine (as it was then titled) while in graduate school at Washington University. In 1982, Williams was hired at the magazine, and worked with Isaac Asimov for ten years. While working there, she co-founded the Dell Magazines Award for Undergraduate Excellence in Science Fiction and Fantasy Writing (at one time called the Isaac Asimov Award for Undergraduate Excellence in Science Fiction and Fantasy writing). In 2004, with the retirement of Gardner Dozois, she became the editor of the magazine.

Along with Gardner Dozois, Williams also edited the "Isaac Asimov's" anthology series. She also co-edited A Woman's Liberation: A Choice of Futures by and About Women (2001) with Connie Willis. Williams has edited a retrospective anthology of fiction published by Asimov's: Asimov's Science Fiction: 30th Anniversary Anthology. Booklist called the book "A gem, and a credit to editor Williams." Most recently, she edited Enter a Future: Fantastic Tales from Asimov's Science Fiction.

Williams won the Hugo Award for Best Professional Editor, Short Form in 2011 and 2012.

She was awarded a 2017 Kate Wilhelm Solstice Award by the SFWA.

Williams was a finalist for the Hugo Award for Best Professional Editor, Short Form in 2026.

== Personal life ==
Williams is married to David Bruce and has two daughters.

Williams was hospitalized after suffering a brain aneurysm in early January, 2026. Senior Managing Editor Emily Hockaday will act as interim editor as Williams recovers.

== Bibliography ==
=== Anthologies ===
- Williams, Sheila & Cynthia Manson, eds. (1986). Tales from Isaac Asimov's Science Fiction Magazine. New York: Harcourt Brace Jovanovich.
- Williams, Sheila, ed. (1990). Robots from Asimov's. Davis Publications.
- Williams, Sheila & Charles Ardai, eds. (1990). Why I left Harry's All-Night Hamburgers and other stories from Isaac Asimov's Science Fiction Magazine. New York: Delacorte Press.
- Dozois, Gardner & Sheila Williams, eds. (1991). Isaac Asimov's Robots. New York: Ace Books.
- — & —, eds. (1992). Isaac Asimov's Earth. New York: Ace Books.
- Williams, Sheila, ed. (1993). The Loch Moose Monster : more stories from Isaac Asimov's Science Fiction Magazine. Delacorte Press.
- Dozois, Gardner & Sheila Williams, eds. (1994). Isaac Asimov's cyberdreams. New York: Ace Books.
- — & —, eds. (1995). Isaac Asimov's ghosts. New York: Ace Books.
- — & —, eds. (1995). Isaac Asimov's skin deep. New York: Ace Books.
- Williams, Sheila, ed. (1995). Hugo and Nebula award winners from Asimov's Science Fiction. New York: WingsBooks.
- Williams, Sheila & Cynthia Manson, eds. (1996). Intergalactic mercenaries. New York: Penguin.
- Dozois, Gardner & Sheila Williams, eds. (1996). Isaac Asimov's vampires. New York: Ace Books.
- — & —, eds. (1997). Isaac Asimov's moons. New York: Ace Books.
- — & —, eds. (1997). Isaac Asimov's Christmas. New York: Ace Books.
- — & —, eds. (1998). Isaac Asimov's Camelot. New York: Ace Books.
- — & —, eds. (1998). Isaac Asimov's detectives. New York: Ace Books.
- — & —, eds. (1999). Isaac Asimov's Solar System. New York: Ace Books.
- — & —, eds. (1999). Isaac Asimov's Valentines. New York: Ace Books.
- — & —, eds. (1999). Isaac Asimov's werewolves. New York: Ace Books.
- — & —, eds. (2000). Isaac Asimov's Mother's Day. New York: Ace Books.
- — & —, eds. (2000). Isaac Asimov's utopias. New York: Ace Books.
- — & —, eds. (2001). Isaac Asimov's Father's Day. New York: Ace Books.
- — & —, eds. (2001). Isaac Asimov's Halloween. New York: Ace Books.
- Willis, Connie & Sheila Williams, eds. (2001). A Woman's Liberation : A Choice of Futures by and About Women. New York: Warner Books.
- Williams, Sheila, ed. (2007). Asimov's Science Fiction : 30th Anniversary Anthology. Tachyon Publications.
- —, ed. (2010). Enter a future : Fantastic Tales from Asimov's Science Fiction (ebook). Dell Magazines.
- —, ed. (2020). Entanglements: Tomorrow's Lovers, Families, and Friends. The MIT Press.

=== Essays and reporting ===
- Williams, Sheila (July 2013). "In memoriam : Steven Utley, 1948-2013". Asimov's Science Fiction. 37 (7): 5.
