= Yummly =

American recipe website and mobile app

Yummly, Inc.
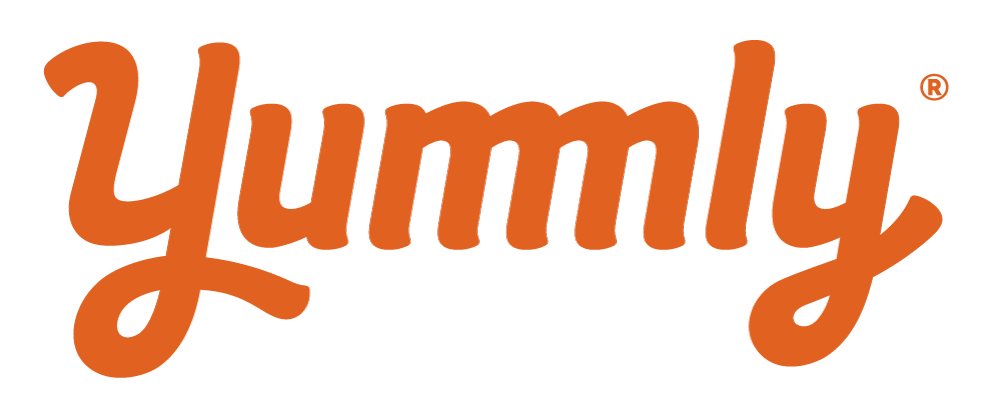
- Type: Subsidiary
- Industry: Software; Internet; Kitchen Appliances
- Founded: October 2008
- Founder: David Feller; Vadim Geshel
- Headquarters: San Carlos, California,
- Key people: Andrew Grose (Chief Operating Officer 2019-present); David Feller (Chief Executive Officer 2008-2017); Vadim Geshel (CTO 2008-2021); Brian Witlin (Chief Executive Officer 2017-2021)
- Products: Search
- Parent: Whirlpool Corporation
- Website: yummly.com

Yummly was an American website and mobile app that provided users recipes via recommendations and a search engine. Yummly used a knowledge graph to offer a semantic web search engine for food, cooking and recipes.

== History ==
The company was founded by David Feller and Vadim Geshel in early 2008. Feller was with Half.com, eBay and StumbleUpon. Yummly raised 7.8 million in venture capital and was backed by First Round Capital, Harrison Metal Capital, Intel Capital, and Unilever Ventures.

In March 2013, Yummly opened access to its application programming interface to other companies as a paid service. The API allows searching for ingredients, cooking methods, and nutritional data.

In 2014, Yummly had 15 million active users in the US and launched international websites in the UK, Germany and The Netherlands.

In May 2017, the company was acquired by appliance maker Whirlpool Corporation and allowed to operate as a subsidiary, keeping its current head office.

On 3rd April 2024, website TheSpoon reported that the entire Yummly team had been made redundant. The app and website were taken offline in December 2024, with the latter pointing to KitchenAid's US website.

== Reception ==
In December 2014, Yummly was named by Apple as one of the "Best of 2014" apps in the App Store.

In March 2022, PCMag gave Yummly a rating of 3.0 out of 5, praising the app for its "useful recipe-collecting and grocery-shopping tools, as well as cool video lessons," but noting that the app had "numerous issues, including the inability to edit recipes, the absence of a digital pantry, and poor grocery data consolidation," comparing it negatively with rival meal-planning app Paprika.

== See also ==
- List of websites about food and drink
