= Her Furry Face =

1983 short story by Leigh Kennedy

"Her Furry Face" is a 1983 science fiction short story by American writer Leigh Kennedy. It was first published in Asimov's Science Fiction.

== Synopsis ==
Douglas is a primatologist who becomes infatuated with his student Annie, an orangutan whose language skills are so developed that she is able to read and write — and to not only understand, but reject, his romantic overtures.

== Reception ==
"Her Furry Face" was a finalist for the Nebula Award for Best Short Story of 1983.

Publishers Weekly, reviewing Kennedy's collection Faces, noted that the story exemplifies Kennedy's "gift for the comic grotesque". The 1988 Science Fiction & Fantasy Book Review Annual, also reviewing Faces, called the story "bizarre" and "beautifully done" (while misidentifying Annie as a chimpanzee). Gwyneth Jones considered it to be a "maybe more disturbing version of" Connie Willis's "All My Darling Daughters", observing that it "equat(es) woman and animal" and "damn(s) the insensitive, self-obsessed human male". Michael Swanwick called it "excellent and disturbing".

Shawna McCarthy, who was editor of Asimov's at the time "Her Furry Face" was published, reported that the story caused "hundreds of complaints and many subscription cancellations", and noted that it served as a "glaring red line of demarcation" between George Scithers' tenure as editor, and her own.

Pat Murphy has stated that the story "lacks many of the overt trappings of science fiction", but emphasizes that she considers it "excellent".
