= Keith Schacht =

American businessperson (born 1979)

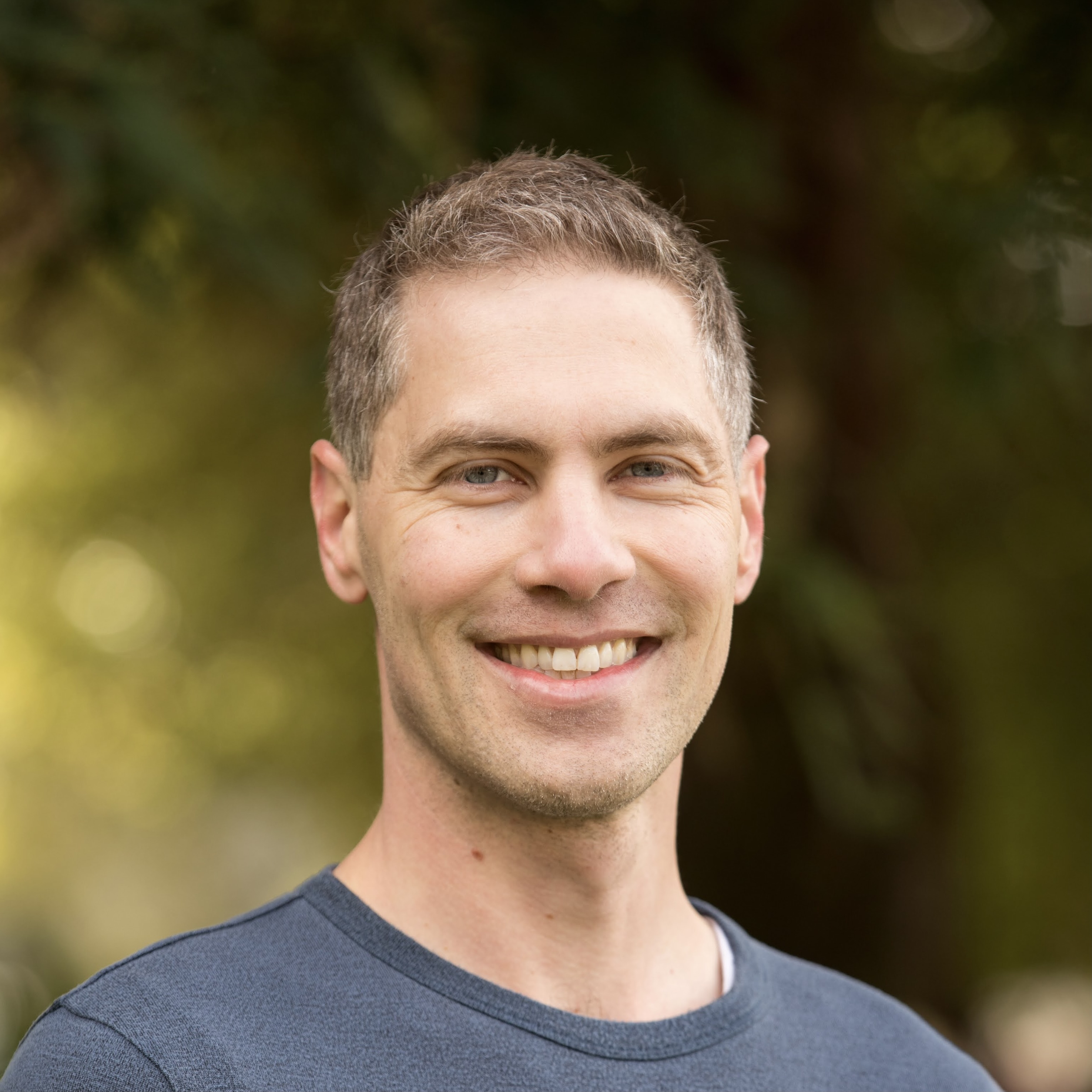
- Born: 9 December 1979 (age 46); United States
- Education: University of Illinois at Urbana–Champaign
- Known for: Mystery Science; TED Conference; Facebook
- Spouse: Pari Schacht

Keith Schacht (born 9 December 1979) is an American entrepreneur and angel investor. He is the CEO and co-founder of Mystery Science and is on the board of directors for eSpark Learning. Schacht is a named inventor on 9 patents. Early in his career he was named one of the top 20 entrepreneurs under 25 by BusinessWeek. He has been a speaker at the TED Conference and has been featured in The Wall Street Journal, Forbes, Fortune, and Wired.

== Career ==
Schacht's first company, founded while in college, was Lever Works, a custom software development shop. It was co-founded with Brian Witlin and Zach Kaplan. In December 2001 Lever Works was sold to Leo Media for an undisclosed sum.

In 2002, Schacht co-founded Inventables, a company that educates companies about new materials and technologies. The company was featured in numerous publications including Forbes in 2006 and Wired in 2007. He also gave a talk on "Toys from the Future" at the TED Conference in 2005.

In 2007, Schacht founded Crafted Fun, an early company building applications on the Facebook platform. Crafted Fun raised funding from Apex Ventures and Naval Ravikant. The company developed a range of Facebook applications including Grow-a-Gift which was cited as a top application used by millions of people.

In 2010, Schacht joined Facebook as a product manager and launched an updated version of News Feed in 2011. He left the company in 2012. During his time at Facebook he was a named inventor on 9 patents.

In 2013, Schacht co-founded Mystery Science with Doug Peltz. Mystery Science creates open-and-go lessons for elementary teachers and helps them teach science without requiring a background in science. A couple notable interviews with Y Combinator, one of their investors, detailed an unconventional business model in which the company sold to schools and districts across the United States without a sales team. Mystery Science has grown to be the most widely used science resource in American elementary schools; it is used by more than 50% of elementary schools reaching more than four million children each month. In 2020 Mystery Science was acquired by Discovery Education for $140 million. Schacht is listed as the majority shareholder at the time of acquisition.

=== Investments ===
Schacht is an investor in at least 25 private companies and numerous public companies. Notable investments include investing in Boom Supersonic, Credit Karma, Canva, Epic!, AngelList, OpenGov, Square (pre-IPO), Tesla (pre-IPO), and Facebook (pre-IPO).
