= There and Back Again (novel) =

1999 novel by Pat Murphy

There and Back Again, by Max Merriwell
- First edition cover
- Author: Pat Murphy
- Language: English
- Publisher: Tor Books
- Publication date: 1999
- ISBN: 0-312-86644-5 (first edition)
- Dewey Decimal: 813.54
- LC Class: PS3563.U748 T48

There and Back Again, by Max Merriwell is a 1999 science fiction novel by Pat Murphy, retelling J.R.R. Tolkien's The Hobbit as a space opera, combined with Lewis Carroll's The Hunting of the Snark. It was published by Tor Books.

Murphy has described it as "both an enormous joke and a serious meta-fictional experiment", with "Max Merriwell" being a science-fiction author who exists in an alternate reality, and whose writing is different from Murphy's own; the book is the first in a series of three novels which are all purportedly written by "Merriwell" under various pseudonyms.

== Synopsis ==
When asteroid-dwelling "norbit" Bailey Beldon discovers a lost message beacon, it leads Gitana the pataphysicist to recruit him for a grand adventure that takes him far from home.

== Reception ==
The Japanese-language version of There and Back Again won the 2002 Seiun Award for Best Translated Novel.

The New York Times described it as a "delight", lauding Murphy's "deceptively casual Tolkienesque prose" and noting her allusions to Alfred Jarry, and proposed that it would serve as an "entertaining romp" even for readers unfamiliar with the source material. Publishers Weekly was less favorable, calling it "disappointing", with insufficient divergence from the source material to compensate for its "recognizability — and thus predictability", and ultimately judging it as "what it purports to be: a second-rate space opera".

John Clute critiqued the book's overall positivity, observing that Murphy's equivalent to the One Ring has no moral cost, and stating that although "The Hobbit is both sombre and hilarious (...) There and Back Again is neither;" he also questioned her choice to integrate elements of Lewis Carroll, which he described as thematically incompatible with Tolkien. James Nicoll, conversely, observed that "Bailey lives (in) a brighter universe than Bilbo, one where the idea of a happy ending is not a sad joke", and emphasized that the text is not a "thumb-fingered one-to-one mapping of a fantasy onto a science fiction setting".

== Legal issues ==
The literary estate of J.R.R. Tolkien declared in 2016 that There and Back Again is an infringement upon their rights to The Hobbit; Murphy has stated that, although she disagrees, and considers it to be a transformative work of feminist commentary, the book's publication has been discontinued so as to obviate further dispute.
