= The Wild Girls =

Children's novel by Pat Murphy

- First edition cover
- Author: Pat Murphy
- Language: English
- Genre: Children's novel
- Publisher: Viking
- Publication date: 2008
- Publication place: United States of America
- Media type: Print
- Pages: 288
- ISBN: 978-0-670-06226-3

The Wild Girls is a children's novel written by Pat Murphy. It won the Christopher Award, as well as the children's category of the 2008 Northern California Independent Booksellers Association Book of the Year Awards.

== Plot ==
The novel centers around a twelve-year-old girl by the name of Joan who has just moved from Connecticut to a town in California. She figures her time will be miserable until she meets a girl named Sarah, who prefers to be called "Fox" and who lives with her writer father in a rundown house in the middle of the woods.

Joan and Sarah—Newt and Fox—spend all their spare time outside, talking and fooling around, and soon start writing stories together. When they win first place in a student fiction writing contest, they are recruited for a prestigious summer writing class taught by a free spirit named Verla Volante.
