= Zach Kaplan =

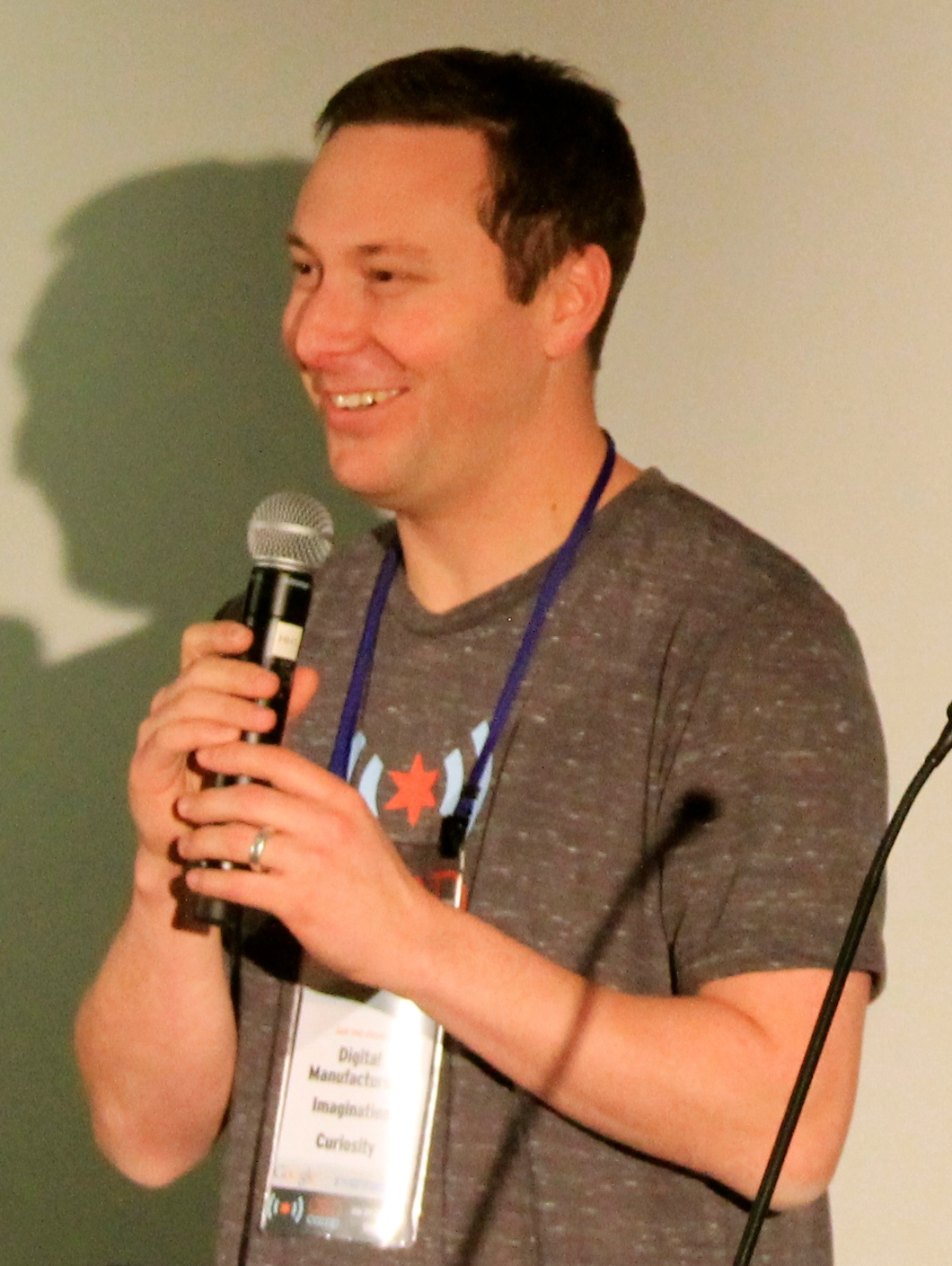
Zach Kaplan in 2014

Zach Kaplan (born in 1979) is an American entrepreneur and the CEO of Inventables.

== Early life and education ==
Kaplan was raised near Chicago, Illinois. He attended Glenbrook North High School. In his senior year, he built a working model roller coaster. Kaplan graduated from the University of Illinois with a bachelor's degree in Mechanical Engineering.

== Career ==
Kaplan's career began while a senior at the University of Illinois. He co-founded a custom software development company called Lever Works with Keith Schacht and Brian Witlin. In December 2001 Lever Works was sold to Leo Media.

In 2002, Kaplan co-founded Inventables, a company that connects product developers with novel materials. The company's success garnered media attention for Kaplan. He was featured on National Public Radio in 2007 and presented a talk on "Toys from the Future" at the TED Conference in 2005. The company's products have been featured on the show Prototype This! on the Discovery Channel.

In January 2009 TechCrunch reported Kaplan raised $2 million from True Ventures a venture capital firm located in San Francisco. With the funding Inventables launched an online marketplace for materials where vendors can create free product profiles to advertise their products and engineers and designers can find these materials.

In June 2013 TechCrunch reported Kaplan raised $3 million from True Ventures a venture capital firm located in San Francisco along with Tim Draper (via Draper Associates), Pipeline Capital Partners, Dundee Venture Capital, Richard Yoo (founder of Rackspace), and Georges Harik participating. This brings Inventables’ total funding to $5 million.
