= Asimov's Science Fiction: 30th Anniversary Anthology =

2007 anthology edited by Sheila Williams

- First edition
- Author: Edited by Sheila Williams
- Cover artist: Michael Whelan
- Language: English
- Genre: Science fiction anthology
- Publisher: Tachyon Publications
- Publication date: 2007
- Publication place: United States
- Media type: Print (Paperback)
- Pages: 349 pp
- ISBN: 978-1-892391-47-6
- OCLC: 145499823

Asimov's Science Fiction: 30th Anniversary Anthology (2007) is a science fiction anthology edited by Sheila Williams, the editor of Asimov's Science Fiction, of short stories that were all originally published in Asimov's. The book includes a five-page introduction by Williams, in which she briefly reviews the history of the magazine and clarifies that the book is merely a sampling from the magazine's history, not an attempt at a "best of", because that would have to run to many volumes. The book includes seventeen short stories, and a nine-page set of brief author biographies at the end.

The stories are as follows, with dates of original publication in Asimov's:

Author	Short story	Year of original publication in Asimov's	Annotation
John Varley (under the pseudonym Herb Boehm)	Air Raid	1977	1977 was the debut issue of Asimov's
Robert Silverberg	The Time of the Burning	1982	
Octavia E. Butler	Speech Sounds	1983	
Bruce Sterling	Dinner in Audoghast	1985	
Isaac Asimov	Robot Dreams	1986	
Kim Stanley Robinson	Glacier	1988	
Connie Willis	Cibola	1990	
Jonathan Lethem	The Happy Man	1991	
Mike Resnick	Over There	1991	
Ursula K. Le Guin	Ether, OR	1995	
Kelly Link	Flying Lessons	1996	1996 was the debut publication by Link
James Patrick Kelly	Itsy Bitsy Spider	1997	
Michael Swanwick	Ancient Engines	1999	
Charles Stross	Lobsters	2001	
Lucius Shepard	Only Partly Here	2003	
Stephen Baxter	The Children of Time	2005	
Robert Reed	Eight Episodes	2006	
