= The Fifth Sacred Thing =

1993 novel by Starhawk

- Cover of trade paperback edition
- Author: Starhawk
- Cover artist: Keith Batcheller
- Language: English
- Genre: Post-apocalyptic
- Publisher: Bantam
- Publication date: 1993
- Publication place: United States
- Media type: Print (hardcover, trade paperback and mass market paperback)
- Pages: 486
- ISBN: 0-553-37380-3
- OCLC: 30569542
- Preceded by: Walking to Mercury
- Followed by: City of Refuge

The Fifth Sacred Thing is a 1993 post-apocalyptic novel by American writer Starhawk. The title refers to the classical elements of fire, earth, air, and water, plus the fifth element, spirit, accessible when one has balanced the other four.

== Plot ==
The novel describes a world set in the year 2048 after a catastrophe which has fractured the United States into several nations. The protagonists live in San Francisco and have evolved in the direction of Ecotopia, reverting to a sustainable economy, using wind power, local agriculture, and the like. San Francisco is presented as a mostly pagan city where the streets have been torn up for gardens and streams, no one starves or is homeless, and the city's defense council consists primarily of nine elderly women who "listen and dream". The novel describes "a utopia where women are leading societies but are doing so with the consent of men." (Note: Schönpflug misnames work as "The Fifth Element") To the south, an overtly theocratic Christian fundamentalist nation has evolved and plans to wage war against the San Franciscans. The novel explores the events before and during the ensuing struggle between the two nations, pitting utopia and dystopia against each other.

The story is primarily told from the points of view of 98-year-old Maya, her nominal granddaughter Madrone, and Maya's grandson Bird. Through these and other characters, the story explores many elements from ecofeminism and ecotopian fiction.

== Setting ==
In the utopia described in the novel, the streets have been dug up and are replaced with gardens and fruit trees. Additionally, every house is equipped with a small garden plot. The food is available to everyone and access to food is not limited by money, power, or ownership. Farms where the city's fruit and vegetables grow are hidden behind the blocks of homes. There is plenty of food and everyone is said to have more than enough to eat. The gardens are lined with streams that run throughout the city. The only remnants of the pavement that once existed are narrow paths meant for walking, cycling, or rollerblading. These paths are accented with colorful stones and mosaics. The city is depicted as a beautiful locale where everything is shared yet nothing is lacking. In this ecotopian city, food and many other resources are understood as a commons, rather than a commodity.

When the city is threatened by an army marching from the South, food becomes central to the non-violent philosophy and practice of the inhabitants as they grapple with how to respond to the possibility of violent attack. The inhabitants decide to invite soldiers to leave the army and to join them living in this ecotopian city. They say to the soldiers 'there is a place set for you at our table, if you will choose to join us' (p. 235). This invitation, and the possibility of never going hungry, is almost incomprehensible to the soldiers who have been stripped of their given names and reduced to numbers, survive on small amounts of poor-quality food, and many have never seen running water.

== Reception ==
The novel won "Best Science Fiction, Fantasy or Horror Novel" at the 6th Lambda Literary Awards.

Kirkus Reviews described the book as "a big, shaggy, sloppy dog of a fantasy" and added, "Starhawk deserves points for her idealism, but her vision and characterizations are only half-realized here—and further muddied as she goes on far, far too long."

Publishers Weekly called it a "sometimes clumsy but compelling first novel" by Starhawk: "[she] delivers her message with a heavy hand and several cliches: her besieged utopia echoes the liberal politics and ecofeminism of her nonfiction; her dystopia features the overused SF bugbear of Christian fanaticism. However, she creates memorable characters—a young midwife, a broken musician, an old Witch-Woman—and skillfully conveys their emotions in gripping, sometimes harrowing scenes set against vivid backdrops."

== Prequel and sequel ==
A prequel, Walking to Mercury (ISBN 0-553-10233-8), was released in 1997. A sequel, City of Refuge (ISBN 978-0996959506), was released in 2016 following a Kickstarter campaign by the author.

== See also ==
- The City, Not Long After
- The Gate to Women's Country
