= The City, Not Long After =

1989 novel by Pat Murphy

- Author: Pat Murphy
- Language: English
- Genre: Science fiction
- Publisher: Doubleday
- Publication date: 1989
- Pages: 244
- ISBN: 038524925X

The City, Not Long After is a 1989 postapocalyptic science fiction novel by Pat Murphy that incorporates elements of magic realism.

== Plot summary ==
The novel is set almost 20 years after a plague has devastated the Earth's population. A few hundred people, most of them artists, live in San Francisco, California, and have built many large-scale artworks there out of salvaged materials. To the east, in the Central Valley, a military government headed by General Miles (nicknamed "Fourstar") has spread from Sacramento and annexed many other towns, including Fresno and Modesto. Miles dreams of recreating the United States of old and is planning to invade San Francisco, which he claims is populated by Godless sinners who are hoarding its resources.

A nameless young woman, whose mother fled the city soon after the plague, has a vision of an angel at her mother's death. It leads her to believe she will be reunited with her mother in the city and inspires her to go there and warn its inhabitants of the coming invasion. While there, she meets the city's residents, acquires a name, and convinces them that the threat of invasion is real and spurs them into taking action to resist it. Believing that they cannot beat Fourstar using straightforward military methods, they improvise their own methods of demoralizing his army, and are aided by mysterious manifestations related to the city's past.

== See also ==
- The Fifth Sacred Thing
