= Paprika (app) =

Meal planning app

- Developer: Hindsight Labs LLC
- Initial release: 2010
- Operating system: iOS, Android, macOS, Windows
- Available in: 16 languages
- Type: Diet, nutrition and weight loss
- Website: www.paprikaapp.com

Paprika is an app and website that helps users organize recipes, produce meal plans, and create grocery lists. The app is available for Android, iOS, macOS, and Windows devices.

== Overview ==
The app allows users to import recipes from various sources, including websites and other apps.

The app also allows users to automatically generate meal plans, which are also customizable, in order to achieve specific objectives such as weight loss, muscle gain, adherence to various dietary preferences, or personal taste.

The app is also capable of generating grocery lists based on the daily or weekly meal plans chosen by the user.

All the recipes, menus, and grocery lists of each user are accessible from smartphones, tablets, and computers.

The app is part of a broader category of mobile apps focused on meal planning, recipe management, and shopping list automation, which have grown in popularity with the expansion of smartphone usage and digital cooking tools.

== History ==
Paprika Recipe Manager for iPad version 1.0 was initially released in September 2010 by Hindsight LLC.

Paprika 2.0 was released for iPhone and iPad in November 2013, and Paprika 3.0 was released for iOS and macOS in November 2017.

== Reception ==
Paprika has been featured in technology and lifestyle publications as a recipe management and meal planning application. Coverage has noted features such as importing recipes from websites, ingredient scaling, and cross-platform synchronization. The app has also appeared in lists of cooking and meal planning tools published by outlets including The Verge and The Kitchn.
