= Emily Hockaday =

American science fiction editor

Emily Alta Hockaday has been the Interim Editor of Asimov's Science Fiction Magazine since January 2026, and the Senior Managing Editor of Asimov’s and Analog Science Fiction and Fact since 2011. She is also the author of five poetry chapbooks.
