= Doug Peltz =

American science educator

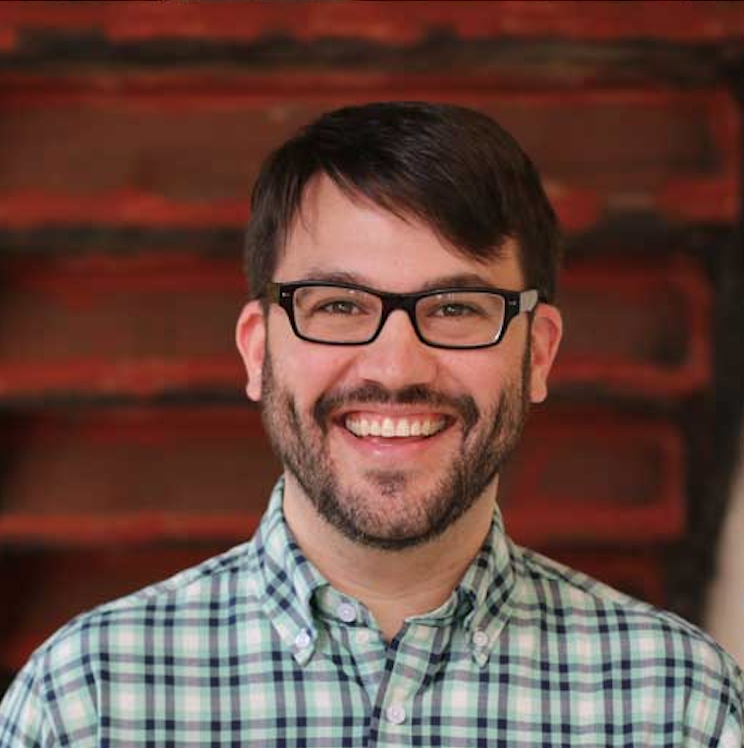
- Born: United States
- Education: University of Illinois at Urbana–Champaign
- Known for: Mystery Science
- Spouse: Natile Braun

Doug Peltz, popularly known as Mystery Doug, is an American science communicator and entrepreneur based in San Francisco. He is best known as the co-founder of the popular science curriculum Mystery Science, a science program used in 50% of U.S. elementary schools and recently acquired by Discovery Education. Mystery Science answers questions that viewers ask through activities and experiments.

== Career ==
One of the first sightings of the Mediterranean red bug in North America was recorded by Peltz, who was then working as a middle school science teacher.

In 2013, he co-founded the Mystery Science curriculum program with Keith Schacht. Interviews with Y Combinator, one their investors, detailed an unconventional business model in which the company sold to schools and districts across the United States without a sales team.

In October 2017, he launched an initiative titled Eclipse America in which Mystery Science partnered with Google to provide free eclipse glasses and lessons to teachers in classrooms. Peltz's business endeavors have been featured by the Wall Street Journal.

In October 2020, Peltz joined Discovery Education as Mystery Science became a wholly owned subsidiary; Mystery Science was acquired for $140 million. The science program is now used in more than 50% of elementary schools.
