= Leigh Kennedy =

American British science fiction writer (born 1951)

- Born: June 4, 1951 (age 75) Denver, Colorado, U.S.
- Occupation: Writer
- Genre: Science fiction
- Spouse: Christopher Priest (m. 1988–2011)
- Children: 2

Leigh Kennedy (born June 4, 1951) is an American science fiction writer. She was born in Denver, Colorado, and has lived in the United Kingdom since 1985.

Kennedy's story "Her Furry Face" was a nominee for the Nebula Award for Best Short Story.

She was married from 1988 until 2011 to writer Christopher Priest, with whom she had twins.

== Works ==
=== Novels ===
- The Journal of Nicholas the American (1986)
- Saint Hiroshima (1987)

=== Collections ===
- Faces (1986)
- Wind Angels (2011)
