= Brian Witlin =

American businessman

- Born: Chicago, Illinois, United States
- Education: Lehigh University B.S. In Business and Economics; Stanford University Masters in Mechanical Engineering and Design
- Occupation: Chief executive officer at yummly
- Website: brianwitlinart.com

Brian Witlin is an American businessman and fine artist. He is an entrepreneur who has co-founded tech companies including Leverworks, Shopwell, Golaces and has led Yummly as its CEO both before and after being acquired by Whirlpool in 2017. Witlin participates as a lecturer at Stanford University's Hasso Plattner Institute of Design.

== Early life ==
Brian Witlin was raised near Chicago, Illinois. He attended Glenbrook North High School. Witlin graduated from Lehigh University with a bachelor's degree in business and economics. He served two terms as class of 2001 President and founded his first software company in his dorm room. Brian later completed his master's degree in Mechanical Engineering and Design at the Stanford University School of Engineering. For his Master's thesis, Witlin Co-Founded RootPhi, a new product development incubator with partner Doug Patt.

== Career ==
Witlin's career began while a senior at Lehigh University. He co-founded a custom software development company called Lever Works with Keith Schacht and Zach Kaplan. In December 2001 Lever Works was sold to Leo Media for an undisclosed sum.

=== RootPhi ===
While completing his master's degree in Mechanical Engineering and Design at the Stanford University School of Engineering, Witlin Co-Founded RootPhi, a new product development incubator with partner Doug Patt. The company's success and approach to portfolio innovation garnered media attention for Witlin. On September 4, 2007, while in partnership with Timbuk2 making limited edition messenger bags out of RootPhi's Reclaim Brand recycled fabric, Timbuk2 and RootPhi received a Cease and Desist letter from Target for using the bullseye logo within the Reclaim fabric. This fabric was utilized in a line of limited edition messenger bags manufactured by Timbuk2 (Lamitron Bags). This move by Target halted production of the recycled bags angering many and sparking controversy around copyright law and recycled and repurposed materials. Although the collaboration with Timbuk2 ended prematurely, RootPhi was able to successfully sell another of their incubated companies, GoLaces, LLC, a footwear accessory business to a publicly traded footwear company for an undisclosed amount in February 2008.

=== IDEO and Shopwell ===
After the sale of Golaces, Brian, in conversation with founder David M. Kelley, joined global design firm IDEO as Entrepreneur in Residence in June 2008. He co-founded a personalized nutrition app, Shopwell that provides healthy food recommendations for users, based on their unique dietary needs. The company raised venture funding from New Venture Partners and IDEO. He led a team of engineering and registered dietitians to create the first personalized nutrition scoring algorithm leveraging machine learning and dietetics. Shopwell was acquired by HarvestMark in 2013, which was again acquired by Innit in 2016.

=== Yummly ===
In 2009, Witlin was appointed as a head of mobile & platform of the personalized recipe recommendations and search platform, Yummly by their board of directors. He handled day-to-day operations and opened its API to other companies as a paid service. By 2014, it has 15 million active users in the US and was named "Best of 2014" in Apple's App Store. He became the chief executive officer of the company in October 2016. Under his leadership, Yummly grew from 1M to 27M registered users, before acquired by the appliance manufacturer Whirlpool in 2017 for an undisclosed amount.

== Fine artist ==
Witlin is a classically trained artist, claiming to be the first cyborg artist utilizing his classical training and AI. Brian has created hundreds of replications of his own artistic brain using computer vision and machine learning. He collaborates with these AI (artificial intelligence) models to create each composition which is then rendered in oil on canvas. His practice largely speaks to the growing relationship between human and machine while examining the role technology plays in everyday life. He is represented by Melissa Morgan Fine Art and JJ Harrington Gallery.

== Public speaking ==
Witlin speaks frequently at conferences and industry events on the topics of artificial intelligence, marketing automation and user growth, such as SXSW, Growth Beat, VentureBeat Webinars, Smart Kitchen Summit and Health 2.0 conferences. He has also participated in the design forums and has given lectures at the Hasso Plattner Institute of Design.

== Others ==
Witlin holds 8 patents that are registered in his name. He is the current advisor of startups, including Directly, Zeel and Upside, and has also served as an advisor 500 Startups, StartX, and the Designer Fund earlier. He is also the founder of Diamond MMA, a premium martial arts protective equipment manufacturer and an Apple Watch band company, Archr.co. Apart from business, Witlin is also a trained fine art artist and photographer. He is also a lecturer at the Stanford University's at Hasso Plattner Institute of Design, where he runs executive education programs and coaches students about entrepreneurship.
