= The Falling Woman =

1986 novel by Pat Murphy

- First edition
- Author: Pat Murphy
- Cover artist: Peter Scanlan
- Language: English
- Genre: Psychological fantasy
- Publisher: Tor Books
- Publication date: November 1986
- Pages: 287
- ISBN: 0312854064

The Falling Woman is a 1986 contemporary psychological fantasy novel by Pat Murphy. The book won the Nebula Award for Best Novel in 1987.

== Plot summary ==
Elizabeth Butler is an archaeologist, and the author of several popular books that challenge her colleagues' ideas about Maya civilization. Elizabeth has a strange gift, connected to a suicide attempt as a young woman, which allows her to see the spirits of ancient people while she walks at dusk and dawn. The story opens with Elizabeth in the middle of an eight-week field study at Dzibilchaltún. Her team hopes to find dramatic artifacts that will spark interest and increased funding for future field studies at the site.

In the middle of the field study, Elizabeth's estranged adult daughter Diane arrives unannounced. After the death of her father, Elizabeth's ex-husband, Diane suddenly abandoned her life in the United States, and flew to Mexico to see her mother. It is revealed that Diane has seen Elizabeth for only a few brief visits since Elizabeth left her as a young child to be raised by her father. Neither is sure what Diane wants from Elizabeth.

As the two struggle to connect, Elizabeth has a new experience: one of her spirit visions, a Mayan priestess named Zuhuy-kak, can see and speak with Elizabeth. Zuhuy-kak provides unprecedented knowledge about the Mayans' departure from Dzibilchaltún, and leads Elizabeth to the major archaeological find her team needs, but demands a sacrifice to the goddess Ix Chebel Yax. As the dig progresses, haunted by bad luck and tragedy, Zuhuy-kak makes it clear that Elizabeth must sacrifice her daughter.
