= Rachel in Love =

- Short story by Pat Murphy
- Language: English
- Genre: Science fiction

Publication
- Published in: Asimov's Science Fiction
- Publication type: Magazine
- Publication date: 1987

"Rachel in Love" is a 1987 science fiction short story by American writer Pat Murphy. It was first published in Asimov's Science Fiction.

== Synopsis ==
When a neurologist's teenage daughter Rachel is killed, he secretly copies a recording of her personality into a chimpanzee with amplified intelligence, and teaches her sign language; however, when he dies without having told anyone that Rachel lives on, the authorities transfer her to a primatology research center.

== Reception ==
"Rachel in Love" won the 1987 Nebula Award for Best Novelette, the 1988 Theodore Sturgeon Memorial Award, and the 1988 Locus Award for Best Novelette, and was a finalist for the 1988 Hugo Award for Best Novelette.
