= Pat Murphy (writer) =

American novelist (born 1955)

Patrice Ann Murphy
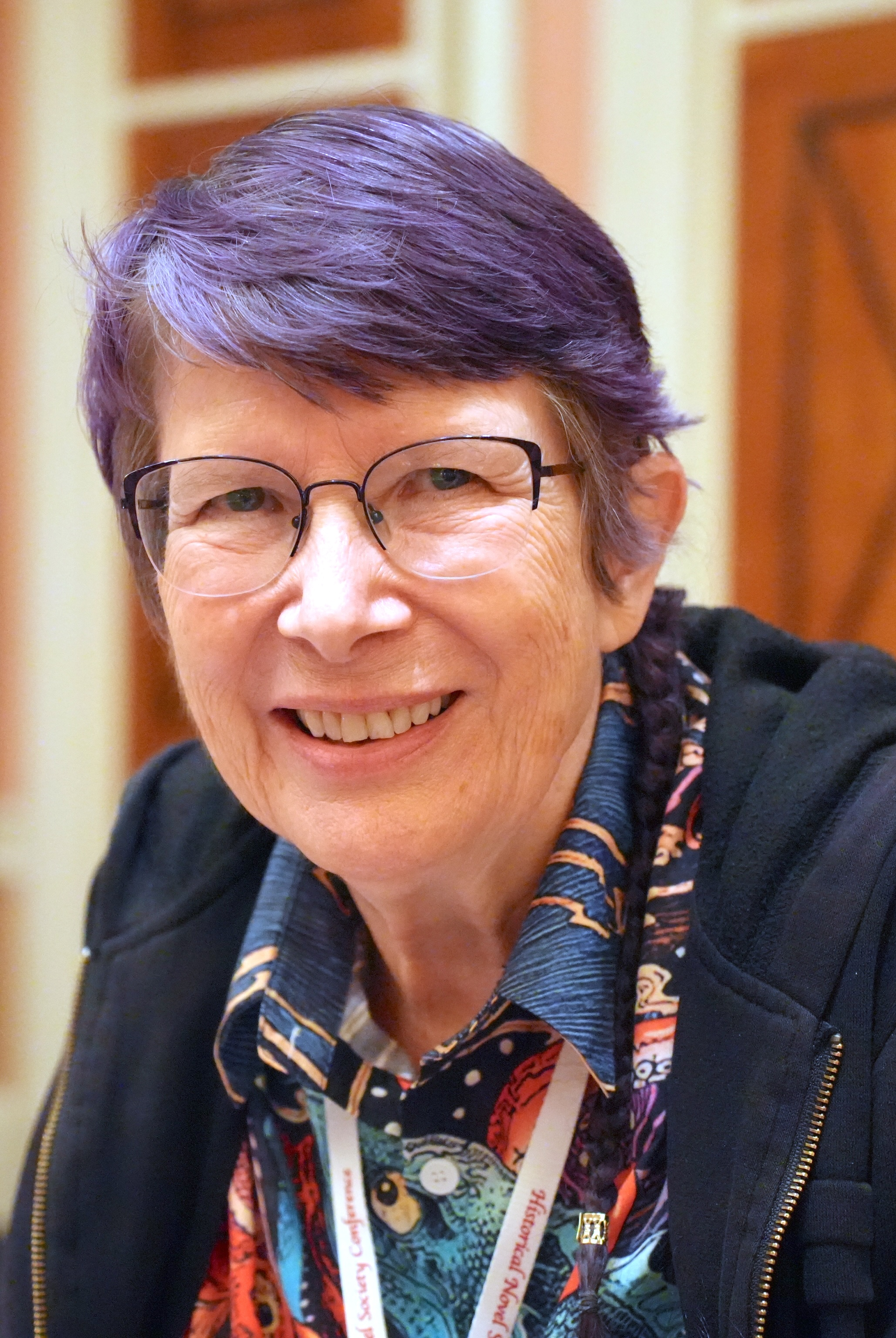
- Murphy in 2025
- Born: March 9, 1955 (age 71); Washington, US
- Writing career
- Notable awards: Nebula Award (1988); Locus Award (1988); Theodore Sturgeon Award (1988); World Fantasy Award (1991)

Patrice Ann "Pat" Murphy (born March 9, 1955) is an American science writer and author of science fiction and fantasy novels.

== Early life ==
Murphy was born on March 9, 1955, in Washington state.

== Career ==
Murphy has used the ideas of the absurdist pseudophilosophy pataphysics in some of her writings. Along with Lisa Goldstein and Michaela Roessner, she has formed The Brazen Hussies to promote their work. Together with Karen Joy Fowler, Murphy co-founded the James Tiptree, Jr. Award in 1991.

With her second novel, The Falling Woman (1986), she won the Nebula Award, and another Nebula Award in the same year for her novelette, "Rachel in Love." Her short story collection, Points of Departure (1990) won the Philip K. Dick Award, and her 1990 novella, Bones, won the World Fantasy Award in 1991.

From 1998 through 2018, Pat Murphy and Paul Doherty (a scientist and educator) jointly wrote the recurring 'Science' column in the Magazine of Fantasy & Science Fiction that typically appeared twice each year. Their last column was in the May/June 2018 issue; Doherty died in August 2017.

== Personal life ==
She lives in Nevada and, for more than 20 years, when she was not writing science fiction, she worked at the Exploratorium, San Francisco's museum of science, art, and human perception. There, she published non-fiction as part of the museum staff.

In 2014, Murphy was hired by Doug Peltz to join Mystery Science (company) as the first employee, creating science curriculum for elementary school teachers.

She has a black belt in the martial art kenpō.

== Bibliography ==
=== Novels ===
- The Shadow Hunter (1982; partially rewritten and republished in 2002)
- The Falling Woman (1986)
- The City, Not Long After (1989)
- Nadya: The Wolf Chronicles (1996)
- There and Back Again (1999)
- Wild Angel (2001)
- Adventures in Time and Space with Max Merriwell (2002)
- The Wild Girls (children's novel) (2007)
- The Adventures of Mary Darling (2025)

=== Short fiction ===
Collections

- Points of Departure (1990)
- Women Up to No Good (2013)

Stories

- "No Mother Near" (1975)
- "Eyes of the Wolf" (1978)
- "Nightbird at the Window" (1979)
- "A Lingering Scent of Jasmine" (1980)
- "Don't Look Back" (1980)
- "Touch of the Bear" (1980)
- "Wish Hound" (1980)
- "Orange Blossom Time" (1981)
- "Sweetly the Waves Call to Me" (1981)
- "In the Islands" (1983)
- "Art in the War Zone" (1984) Novelette
- "On the Dark Side of the Station Where the Train Never Stops" (1984)
- "With Four Lean Hounds" (1984) Novelette
- "On a Hot Summer Night in a Place Far Away" (1985)
- "His Vegetable Wife" (1986)
- "A Falling Star Is a Rock from Outer Space" (1986)
- "In the Abode of the Snows" (1986) Novelette
- "Clay Devils" (1987)
- "Rachel in Love" (1987) Novelette
- "Good-Bye, Cynthia" (1988)
- "Dead Men on TV" (1988)
- "Prescience" (1989)
- "How I Spent My Summer Vacation" (1989)
- "Scavenger" (1989)
- "Bones" (1990) Novella
- "Love and Sex Among the Invertebrates" (1990)
- "Latter-Day Martian Chronicles" (1990)
- "Recycling Strategies for the Inner City" (1990)
- "Women in the Trees" (1990)
- "The Eradication of Romantic Love" (1991)
- "Peter" (1991)
- "Traveling West" (1991) Novelette
- "Desert Rain" (1991) Novella (with Mark L. Van Name)
- "South of Oregon City" (1991) Novelette
- "Going Through Changes" (1992)
- "An American Childhood" (1993) Novella
- "A Cartographic Analysis of the Dream State" (1993) Novelette
- "Games of Deception" (1994)
- "A Place of Honor" (1995)
- "Points of Departure" (1995)
- "A Flock of Lawn Flamingos" (1996)
- "Iris Versus the Black Knight" (1996)
- "Exploding, Like Fireworks" (1997)
- "The True Story" (1997)
- "Wonder Worlds" (1997) Novelette (with Richard Kadrey)
- "Attachments" (1998)
- "Ménage and Menagerie" (1998) Novelette
- "Green Fire" (1999) Novelette (with Andy Duncan, Eileen Gunn & Michael Swanwick)
- "The Wild Girls" (2003)
- "Dragon's Gate" (2003) Novelette
- "Inappropriate Behavior" (2004) Novelette
- "One Odd Shoe" (2007)
- "About Fairies" (2012)
- "Cold Comfort" (2016) Novelette (with Paul Doherty)
- "Crossing the Threshold" (2017)
- "Fix-It Shop" (2017)
- "Motherhood" (2019)
- "A Catalog of 21st Century Ghosts" (2024)
- "Not Alone" (2025)

=== Anthologies edited ===
- The James Tiptree Award Anthology 1 (2005) with Debbie Notkin, Karen Joy Fowler and Jeffrey D. Smith. Tachyon Publications
- The James Tiptree Award Anthology 2 (2006) with Debbie Notkin, Karen Joy Fowler and Jeffrey D. Smith. Tachyon Publications.
- The James Tiptree Award Anthology 3 (2007) with Debbie Notkin, Karen Joy Fowler and Jeffrey D. Smith. Tachyon Publications.

=== Nonfiction ===
- Joseph, James; Witold Klawe; Pat Murphy (1979). Tuna and billfish : fish without a country. Paintings by George Mattson. La Jolla, Calif.: Inter-American Tropical Tuna Commission.
- Imaginary Friends (1996 essay)
- Before and After (1997 travel essay)
- Explorabook: A Kid's Science Museum in a Book by John Cassidy, Pat Murphy, and Paul Doherty (1991)
- Murphy, Pat (1993). Bending light : an Exploratorium toolbook.
- By Nature's Design (1993) by Pat Murphy
- The Science Explorer (1996) by Pat Murphy, Ellen Klages, and Linda Shore
- The Color of Nature (1996) by Pat Murphy and Paul Doherty
- The Science Explorer Out and About (1997) by Pat Murphy, Ellen Klages, and Linda Shore
- Zap Science: A Scientific Playground in a Book (1997) by John Cassidy, Paul Doherty, & Pat Murphy
- Murphy, Pat & Paul Doherty (March 2000). "Nightfall, revisited". Science. F&SF. 98 (3): 119–126. Archived from the original on December 27, 2004.
- Doherty, Paul & Pat Murphy (May 2000). "General relativity at home". Science. F&SF. 98 (5): 108–116. Archived from the original on December 27, 2004.
- — & — (August 2000). "Playing with fire". Science. F&SF. 99 (2): 112–120. Archived from the original on December 27, 2004.
- — & — (January 2001). "Death rays and other experiments to try at home". Science. F&SF. 100 (1): 114–121. Archived from the original on December 27, 2004.
- Murphy, Pat (2006). Exploratopia.
- Doherty, Paul & Pat Murphy (October–November 2008). "Rocks in space". Science. F&SF. 115 (4&5): 183–191. Archived from the original on September 26, 2008.
- — & — (July–August 2011). "Pattern recognition, randomness, and Roshambo". Science. F&SF. 121 (1&2): 183–191. Archived from the original on August 6, 2011.

== Awards ==
Work	Year & Award	Category	Result	Ref.
The Shadow Hunter	1983 Locus Award	First Novel	Nominated	
The Falling Woman	1987 Locus Award	Fantasy Novel	Nominated	
The Falling Woman	1988 Mythopoeic Awards	Fantasy	Nominated	
The Falling Woman	1988 Nebula Award	Novel	Won	
"Rachel in Love"	1988 Theodore Sturgeon Award	Short Science Fiction	Won	
"Rachel in Love"	1988 Hugo Award	Novelette	Nominated	
"Rachel in Love"	1988 Nebula Award	Novelette	Won	
"Rachel in Love"	1988 SF Chronicle Award	Novelette	Nominated	
"Rachel in Love"	1988 Asimov's Readers' Poll	Novelette	Won	
"Rachel in Love"	1988 Locus Award	Novelette	Won	
"Dead Men on TV"	1989 Nebula Award	Short Story	Nominated	
"Prescience"	1990 Locus Award	Short Story	Nominated	
The City, Not Long After	1990 Mythopoeic Awards	Fantasy	Nominated	
The City, Not Long After	1990 Locus Award	SF Novel	Nominated	
The City, Not Long After	1991 Arthur C. Clarke Award	Science Fiction Novel	Finalist	
"Love and Sex Among the Invertebrates"	1991 Nebula Award	Short Story	Nominated	
"Love and Sex Among the Invertebrates"	1991 Locus Award	Short Story	Nominated	
Points of Departure	1991 Philip K. Dick Award		Won	
Points of Departure	1991 Locus Award	Collection	Nominated	
"Bones"	1991 World Fantasy Award	Novella	Won	
"Bones"	1991 Hugo Award	Novella	Nominated	
"Bones"	1991 Nebula Award	Novella	Nominated	
"Bones"	1991 Asimov's Readers' Poll	Novella	8th Place	
"Bones"	1991 Locus Award	Novella	Nominated	
"Desert Rain" (with Mark L. Van Name)	1992 Locus Award	Novella	Nominated	
"Traveling West"	1992 Locus Award	Novelette	Nominated	
"An American Childhood"	1994 Hugo Award	Novella	Nominated	
"An American Childhood"	1994 Asimov's Readers' Poll	Novella	7th Place	
"An American Childhood"	1994 Locus Award	Novella	Nominated	
A Place of Honor	1996 Asimov's Readers' Poll	Short Story	8th Place	
Nadya	1996 Otherwise Award		Honor	
Nadya	1997 Locus Award	Fantasy Novel	Nominated	
"Green Fire" (with Eileen Gunn, Andy Duncan & Michael Swanwick)	2001 Asimov's Readers' Poll	Novella	8th Place	
There and Back Again	2002 Seiun Award	Translated Long Work	Won	
"Dragon's Gate"	2004 Locus Award	Novelette	Nominated	
"Inappropriate Behavior"	2005 Locus Award	Novelette	Nominated	
The Wild Girls	2007 Cybils Award	Fiction: Middle Grade	Finalist	
The Wild Girls	2008 Christopher Award	Books for Young People: Ages 10–12	Won	
Exploratopia: More than 400 kid-friendly experiments and explorations for curious minds	2008 AAAS/Subaru SB&F Prize for Excellence in Science Books	Hands-On Science Book	Won	
The Klutz Guide to the Galaxy	2012 American Institute of Physics	Science Communication Awards	Won	
"About Fairies"	2013 Locus Award	Short Story	Nominated	
The Adventures of Mary Darling	2026 World Fantasy Award	Novel	Nominated	
