= Seanan McGuire bibliography =

Bibliography of speculative fiction writer Seanan McGuire and her pseudonyms Mira Grant and A. Deborah Baker.

== Series ==
=== October Daye (2009) ===
==== Books ====
Published by DAW through Book 18, then by Tor Books.

1. Rosemary and Rue (September 1, 2009)
2. A Local Habitation (March 2, 2010)
3. An Artificial Night (September 7, 2010)
4. Late Eclipses (March 1, 2011)
5. One Salt Sea (September 6, 2011)
6. Ashes of Honor (September 4, 2012)
7. Chimes at Midnight (September 3, 2013)
8. The Winter Long (September 2, 2014)
9. A Red Rose Chain (September 1, 2015)
10. Once Broken Faith (September 6, 2016)
11. The Brightest Fell (September 5, 2017)
12. Night and Silence (September 4, 2018)
13. The Unkindest Tide (September 3, 2019)
14. A Killing Frost (September 1, 2020)
15. When Sorrows Come (September 14, 2021)
16. Be the Serpent (August 30, 2022)
17. Sleep No More (September 5, 2023)
18. The Innocent Sleep (October 24, 2023)
19. Silver and Lead (September 30, 2025)
20. A Divided Duty (September 29, 2026)

==== Short fiction ====
1. "Through This House." Home Improvement: Undead Edition. Ace Books. (August 2, 2011)
2. "In Sea-Salt Tears." SeananMcGuire.com. (August 2012)
3. "Rat-Catcher." A Fantasy Medley 2. Subterranean Press. (November 30, 2012)
  - Reprint: Lightspeed Magazine. (March 2016)
4. "Never Shines the Sun." Chimes at Midnight. Print edition. DAW Books. (September 3, 2013)
5. "Forbid the Sea." SeananMcGuire.com. (September 2013)
6. "The Fixed Stars." Shattered Shields. Baen Books. (November 4, 2014)
7. "No Sooner Met." SeananMcGuire.com. (January 2015)
8. "Heaps of Pearl." SeananMcGuire.com. (January 2016)
9. "Stage of Fools." Patreon. (June 1, 2016)
10. "In Little Stars." Patreon. (August 1, 2016)
11. "Full of Briars." DAW Books. (August 2, 2016)
12. "Dreams and Slumbers." Once Broken Faith. (September 6, 2016)
13. "The Voice of Lions." Patreon. (October 1, 2016)
14. "The Act of Hares." Patreon. (January 1, 2017)
15. "Shore to Shore." Patreon. (May 1, 2017)
  - Updated August 1, 2023 to reflect changed continuity
16. "Instruments of Darkness." Patreon. (August 1, 2017)
17. "With Honest Trifles." Patreon. (September 1, 2017)
18. "Of Things Unknown." The Brightest Fell. (September 5, 2017)
19. "In Deepest Consequence." Patreon. (December 1, 2017)
20. "Write in Water." Patreon. (January 1, 2018)
21. "Live in Brass." Patreon. (February 1, 2018)
22. "These Antique Fables." Patreon. (April 1, 2018)
23. "Jealous in Honor." Patreon. (June 1, 2018)
24. "Quick in Quarrel." Patreon. (August 1, 2018)
25. "Suffer a Sea-Change." Night and Silence. (September 4, 2018)
26. "The Ambitious Ocean." Patreon. (October 1, 2018)
27. "And Thrice Again." Patreon. (December 1, 2018)
28. "Of Strange Oaths." Patreon. (April 1, 2019)
29. "Sun Sets Weeping." Patreon. (June 1, 2019)
30. "Dreams and Sighs." Patreon. (August 1, 2019)
31. "Hope is Swift." The Unkindest Tide. (September 3, 2019)
32. "Strangers in Court." Rosemary and Rue. 10th anniversary edition / 1st hardcover edition. DAW Books. (October 1, 2019)
33. "Wishes and Tears." Patreon. (June 1, 2020)
34. "Shine in Pearl." A Killing Frost. (September 1, 2020)
35. "Poor Fancy's Followers." Patreon. (October 1, 2020)
36. "Our Trial Patience." Patreon. (December 1, 2020)
37. "Earth for Charity." Patreon. (April 1, 2021)
38. "Mean and Mighty." Patreon. (September 1, 2021)
39. "And With Reveling." When Sorrows Come. (September 14, 2021)
40. "And Deeps Below." Patreon. (November 1, 2021)
41. "Sacrifice Your Tears." Patreon. (February 1, 2022)
42. "Into the Sea." Patreon. (May 1, 2022)
43. "In Safety Rest." Patreon. (July 1, 2022)
44. "Upon Your Honor." Patreon. (August 1, 2022)
45. "Such Dangerous Seas." Be the Serpent. (August 30, 2022)
46. "With Sweet Peace." Patreon. (September 1, 2022)
47. "Like a Dream." Patreon. (November 1, 2022)
48. "Give Sorrow Words." Patreon. (December 1, 2022)
49. "Distinction of Place." Patreon. (June 1, 2023)
50. "Notes of Sorrow." Patreon. (July 1, 2023)
51. "Drown the Lamenting." Patreon. (September 1, 2023)
52. "Candles and Starlight." Sleep No More. (September 9, 2023)
53. "Doubtless and Secure." The Innocent Sleep. (October 24, 2023)
54. "Fanes That Lie." Patreon. (November 1, 2023)
55. "The Silver Sea." Patreon. (January 1, 2024)
56. "In That Sleep." Patreon. (December 1, 2024)
57. "Chide The Waves." Patreon. (March 1, 2025)
58. "Seas and Shores." Silver and Lead. (September 30, 2025)
59. "Seek Sweet Safety." Patreon. (October 1, 2025)
60. "The Invisible Event." Patreon. (January 1, 2026)

=== Newsflesh [as Mira Grant] (2010) ===
==== Books ====
Published by Orbit Books.

1. Feed (April 27, 2010)
2. Deadline (May 31, 2011)
3. Blackout (June 1, 2012)
4. Feedback (October 4, 2016)

==== Collections ====
1. The Rising. Orbit Books. (February 19, 2019)
  - Omnibus of Feed, Deadline and Blackout
2. Rise: The Complete Newsflesh Collection Orbit Books. (June 21, 2016)
  - Collected short fiction

==== Short fiction ====
1. "Everglades." The Living Dead 2. Night Shade. (September 1, 2010)
2. "Countdown: A Newsflesh Novella." Orbit Books. (August 1, 2011)
3. "Fed." Orbit Books. (May 16, 2012)
4. "San Diego 2014: The Last Stand of the California Browncoats." Orbit Books. (July 11, 2012)
5. "How Green This Land, How Blue this Sea." Orbit Books. (July 1, 2013)
6. "The Day the Dead Came to Show and Tell." Orbit Books. (July 14, 2014)
7. "Please Do Not Taunt the Octopus." Orbit Books. (July 14, 2015)
8. "All the Pretty Little Horses." Orbit Books. (October 3, 2017)
9. "Coming to You Live." Orbit Books. (March 13, 2018)

=== InCryptid (2012) ===
==== Books ====
Published by DAW through book 13, then by Tor Books.

1. Discount Armageddon (March 6, 2012)
2. Midnight Blue-Light Special (March 5, 2013)
3. Half-Off Ragnarok (March 4, 2014)
4. Pocket Apocalypse (March 3, 2015)
5. Chaos Choreography (March 1, 2016)
6. Magic for Nothing (March 7, 2017)
7. Tricks for Free (March 6, 2018)
8. That Ain't Witchcraft (March 5, 2019)
9. Imaginary Numbers (February 25, 2020)
10. Calculated Risks (February 23, 2021)
11. Spelunking Through Hell (March 1, 2022)
12. Backpacking through Bedlam (March 7, 2023)
13. Aftermarket Afterlife (March 5, 2024)
14. Installment Immortality (March 11, 2025)
15. Butterfly Effects (March 10, 2026)
16. Pride and Poltergeists (March 02, 2027)

==== Short fiction ====
1. "The Flower of Arizona." Westward Weird. DAW Books. (February 7, 2012)
2. "One Hell of a Ride." SeananMcGuire.com. (February 2012)
3. "No Place Like Home." SeananMcGuire.com. (April 2012)
4. "Married in Green." SeananMcGuire.com. (March 2013)
5. "Sweet Poison Wine." SeananMcGuire.com. (April 2013)
6. "The First Fall." SeananMcGuire.com. (June 2013)
7. "Bad Dream Girl." Glitter and Mayhem. Apex Book Company. (August 23, 2013)
8. "Loch and Key." SeananMcGuire.com. (August 2013)
9. "We Both Go Down Together." SeananMcGuire.com. (November 2013)
10. "Red as Snow." Hex and the City. Fiction River / WMG Publishing. (December 2013)
  - Reprint: New York Fantastic (November 2017)
11. "Black as Blood." SeananMcGuire.com. (January 2014)
12. "Blocked." SeananMcGuire.com. (February 2014)
13. "The Ghosts of Bourbon Street." SeananMcGuire.com. (March 2014)
14. "Jammed." Games Creatures Play. Ace Books. (April 2014)
15. "Stingers and Strangers." Dead Man's Hand. DAW Books. (May 13, 2014)
16. "IM." SeananMcGuire.com. (June 2014)
17. "Oh Pretty Bird." SeananMcGuire.com. (July 2014)
18. "Bury Me in Satin." SeananMcGuire.com. (August 2014)
19. "Third-Person Draft Chapter from Incryptid: Original Opening for Discount Armageddon." Altered Perceptions. Fearful Symmetry / Waygate Foundation. (October 2014)
20. "Snakes and Ladders." SeananMcGuire.com. (October 2014)
21. "White as a Raven's Wing." SeananMcGuire.com. (December 2014)
22. "Broken Paper Hearts." SeananMcGuire.com. (February 2015)
23. "The Star of New Mexico." SeananMcGuire.com. (June 2015)
24. "Survival Horror." Press Start to Play. Vintage Books. (August 18, 2015)
25. "The Way Home." SeananMcGuire.com. (October 2015)
26. "Snake in the Glass." SeananMcGuire.com. (December 2015)
27. "Swamp Bromeliad." SeananMcGuire.com. (February 2016)
28. "Waking Up in Vegas." SeananMcGuire.com. (May 2016)
29. "Tailed" with Kelley Armstrong. Urban Allies: Ten New Collaborative Stories. Harper Voyager. (July 26, 2016)
30. "Sleepover." Shadowed Souls. Roc Books. (November 1, 2016)
31. "My Last Name." SeananMcGuire.com. (January 2017)
32. "The Lay of the Land." SeananMcGuire.com. (February 2017)
33. "The Recitation of the Most Holy and Harrowing Pilgrimage of Mindy and Also Mork." Patreon. (April 1, 2017)
  - Reprint: Tricks for Free (March 6, 2018)
34. "Balance." Urban Enemies. Gallery Books. (August 2017)
35. "Target Practice." SeananMcGuire.com. (September 2017)
36. "Follow the Lady." That Ain't Witchcraft. (March 5, 2019)
37. "Take the Shot." Patreon. (October 1, 2019)
38. "Winter Sunshine." Patreon. (November 1, 2019)
39. "Off-Balance." Patreon. (January 1, 2020)
40. "All That Glitters." Patreon. (February 1, 2020)
41. "The Measure of a Monster." Imaginary Numbers. (February 25, 2020)
42. "What Was I Meant to Do?" Patreon. (August 1, 2020)
43. "What You Pay For." Patreon. (November 1, 2020)
44. "What You Build." Patreon. (January 1, 2020)
45. "Singing the Comic-Con Blues." Calculated Risks. (February 23, 2021)
46. "By the Hand of the Forest." Patreon. (March 1, 2021)
47. "By Any Other Name." Patreon. (May 1, 2021)
48. "To Build a Better..." Patreon. (June 1, 2021)
49. "Halfway Through the Wood." Patreon. (July 1, 2021)
50. "School Belles." Patreon. (October 1, 2021)
51. "Long Way From Home." Patreon. (January 1, 2022)
52. "And Sweep Up the Wood." Spelunking Through Hell. (March 1, 2022)
53. "How to Bake a Pie." Patreon. (October 1, 2022)
54. "The Mysteries of the Stolen God and Where His Waffles Went." Backpacking Through Bedlam. (March 7, 2023)
55. "Dreaming Of You In Freefall." Aftermarket Afterlife. (March 5, 2024)
56. "Passing Grades in Penance." Patreon. (April 1, 2023)
57. "No One Leaves For Good." Patreon. (June 1, 2024)
58. "Mourner's Waltz." Installment Immortality. (March 11, 2025)
59. "Married in Gray." Patreon. (September 1, 2025)
60. "In a Yellow Wood." Patreon. (March 1, 2026)
61. "We Sing It, Anyway." Butterfly Effects. (March 10, 2026)
62. "A Solitude of Space." Patreon. (April 1, 2026)
63. "Eden Sank to Grief." Patreon. (May 1, 2026)

=== Velveteen (2012) ===
Of the first 50 stories (2012-2017), 49 were originally posted on LiveJournal and a fiftieth posted on McGuire's blog on her website, and then collected into three volumes published by ISFiC Press. Subterranean Press published a fourth volume in 2024 re-releasing the contents of the first two ISFiC Press volumes. Select stories are also republished on McGuire's website. Starting in 2023, McGuire published additional stories on Patreon.

==== ISFiC Collections ====
1. Velveteen vs. the Junior Super Patriots. ISFiC Press. (November 9, 2012)
  - Collects "Velveteen vs. The Isley Crawfish Festival" through "Velveteen vs. The Blind Date"
2. Velveteen vs. the Multiverse. ISFiC Press. (August 23, 2013)
  - Collects "Velveteen vs. Blacklight vs. Sin-Dee" through "Velveteen vs. The Epilogue"
3. Velveteen vs. the Seasons. ISFiC Press. (May 6, 2016)
  - Collects "Velveteen vs. Hypothermia" through "Velveteen Presents Jacqueline Claus vs. The Lost and Found"

==== Subterranean Press Collections ====
1. Velveteen vs. The Early Adventures. Subterranean Press. (2024) Contains:
  - Velveteen vs. the Junior Super Patriots. ISFiC Press
  - Velveteen vs. the Multiverse. ISFiC Press
2. Velveteen vs. The Consequences of Her Actions. Subterranean Press. (2026) Contains:
  - Velveteen vs. the Seasons. ISFiC Press
  - Velveteen vs. Life ("Velveteen vs. Recovery" through "Velveteen vs. a Potential Happy Ending")

==== Short fiction ====
1. "Velveteen vs. The Isley Crawfish Festival." LiveJournal. (August 31, 2008)
2. "Velveteen vs. The Midnight Coffee Society," originally published as "Velveteen vs. The Coffee Freaks." LiveJournal. (September 15, 2008)
3. "Velveteen vs. The Flashback Sequence." LiveJournal. (January 1, 2009)
4. "Velveteen vs. The Old Flame." LiveJournal. (October 19, 2009)
5. "Velveteen vs. The Junior Super Patriots, West Coast Division." LiveJournal. (January 28, 2010)
6. "Velveteen vs. The Eternal Halloween, Part I." LiveJournal. (April 2, 2010)
7. "Velveteen vs. The Eternal Halloween, Part II." LiveJournal. (April 7, 2010)
8. "Velveteen vs. The Ordinary Day." LiveJournal. (December 26, 2010)
9. "Velveteen vs. Patrol." LiveJournal. (May 4, 2011)
10. "Velveteen vs. The Blind Date." LiveJournal. (April 14, 2011)
11. "Velveteen vs. Blacklight vs. Sin-Dee, Part I." LiveJournal. (October 27, 2011)
12. "Velveteen vs. Blacklight vs. Sin-Dee, Part II." LiveJournal. (November 8, 2011)
13. "Velveteen vs. The Holiday Special." LiveJournal. (November 23, 2011)
14. "Velveteen vs. The Secret Identity." LiveJournal. (December 14, 2011)
15. "Martinez and Martinez v. Velveteen." LiveJournal. (February 29, 2012)
16. "Velveteen vs. The Alternate Timeline, Part I." LiveJournal. (September 25, 2012)
17. "Velveteen vs. The Alternate Timeline, Part II." LiveJournal. (November 21, 2012)
18. "Velveteen vs. The Retroactive Continuity." LiveJournal. (December 5, 2012)
19. "Velveteen Presents Victory Anna vs. All These Stupid Parallel Worlds." LiveJournal. (December 27, 2012)
20. "Velveteen vs. The Uncomfortable Conversation." LiveJournal. (December 31, 2012)
21. "Velveteen vs. Bacon." LiveJournal. (January 3, 2013)
22. "Velveteen vs. The Robot Armies of Dr. Walter Creelman, DDS." LiveJournal. (January 10, 2013)
23. "Velveteen vs. The Fright Night Sorority House Massacre Sleepover Camp." LiveJournal. (January 17, 2013)
24. "Velveteen vs. Vegas." LiveJournal. (January 20, 2013)
25. "Velveteen Presents Victory Anna vs. The Difficulties With Pan-Dimensional Courtship." LiveJournal. (January 25, 2013)
26. "Velveteen vs. Legal." LiveJournal. (January 30, 2013)
27. "Velveteen Presents Jackie Frost vs. Four Conversations and a Funeral." LiveJournal. (February 4, 2013)
28. "Velveteen vs. Jolly Roger." LiveJournal. (February 11, 2013)
29. "Velveteen vs. Everyone, Part I." LiveJournal. (February 21, 2013)
30. "Velveteen vs. Everyone, Part II." LiveJournal. (February 25, 2013)
31. "Velveteen vs. The Epilogue." LiveJournal. (March 1, 2013)
32. "Velveteen vs. Hypothermia." LiveJournal. (December 24, 2013)
33. "Velveteen vs. Santa Claus." LiveJournal. (June 30, 2014)
34. "Velveteen vs. Global Warming." LiveJournal. (November 1, 2014)
35. "Velveteen Presents the Princess vs. Public Relations." LiveJournal. (November 20, 2014)
36. "Velveteen vs. The Thaw." LiveJournal. (January 21, 2015)
37. "Velveteen vs. Balance." LiveJournal. (March 23, 2015)
38. "Velveteen vs. Spring Cleaning." LiveJournal. (June 15, 2015)
39. "Velveteen Presents Polychrome vs. The Court of Public Opinion and Not Punching Anyone." LiveJournal. (July 21, 2015)
40. "Velveteen vs. The Melancholy of Autumn." LiveJournal. (September 27, 2015)
41. "Velveteen vs. A Disturbing Number of Crows." LiveJournal. (October 27, 2015)
42. "Velveteen vs. Trick or Treat." LiveJournal. (December 28, 2015)
43. "Velveteen Presents Action Dude vs. Doing the Right Thing." LiveJournal. (February 25, 2016)
44. "Velveteen vs. The Consequences of Her Actions." LiveJournal. (March 23, 2016)
45. "Velveteen vs. Going Home Again." LiveJournal. (August 23, 2016)
46. "Velveteen vs. Everything You Ever Wanted." LiveJournal. (November 8, 2016)
47. "Velveteen vs. The Retroactive Continuity." LiveJournal. (January 17, 2017)
48. "Velveteen Presents Jacqueline Claus vs. The Lost and Found." LiveJournal. (January 27, 2017)
49. "Velveteen vs. Recovery." LiveJournal. (February 14, 2017)
50. "Velveteen vs. Temptation." The Blog of Seanan McGuire. (December 25, 2017)
51. "Velveteen vs. Dr. Darwin." Patreon. (October 1, 2023)
52. "Velveteen vs. Gainful Employment." Patreon. (October 1, 2023)
53. "Velveteen Presents the Princess vs. the Congressional Committee for Superhuman Oversight." Patreon. (December 1, 2023)
54. "Velveteen vs. Evolution." Patreon. (March 1, 2024)
55. "Velveteen vs. Extinction." Patreon. (May 1, 2024)
56. "Velveteen vs. True Love's Kiss." Patreon. (August 1, 2024)
57. "Velveteen vs. The Parliamentarian." Patreon. (September 1, 2024)
58. "Velveteen Presents Tag vs. Being Alive." Patreon. (November 1, 2024)
59. "Velveteen vs. Winter." Patreon. (January 1, 2025)
60. "Velveteen Presents Jacqueline Claus vs. Existence." Patreon. (February 1, 2025)
61. "Velveteen vs. the United States Government." Patreon. (April 1, 2025)
62. "Velveteen vs. The Uncomfortable Resolution." Patreon. (May 1, 2025)
63. "Velveteen vs. Normalcy." Patreon. (July 1, 2025)
64. "Velveteen vs. a Potential Happy Ending." Patreon. (August 1, 2025)

=== Parasitology [as Mira Grant] (2013) ===
==== Books ====
Published by Orbit Books.

1. Parasite (October 29, 2013)
2. Symbiont (November 25, 2014)
3. Chimera (November 24, 2015)

=== Indexing (2014) ===
==== Books ====
Published by 47North.

1. Indexing (January 24, 2014)
  - First published as a Kindle Serial beginning May 21, 2013.
  - Based on/adapted from the 2009 "Indexing" short story.
2. Indexing: Reflections (August 11, 2015)
  - First published as a Kindle Serial.

==== Short fiction ====
1. "Indexing." Book View Cafe. (September 2009)
  - Revised and expanded to form the basis of the Indexing novel.
  - No longer available online, and never published in print.

=== Ghost Roads (2014) ===
Ghost Roads takes place in the InCryptid universe.

==== Books ====
Published by DAW Books.

1. Sparrow Hill Road (May 6, 2014)
2. The Girl in the Green Silk Gown (July 17, 2018)
3. Angel of the Overpass (May 11, 2021)

==== Short fiction ====
1. "Good Girls Go to Heaven." The Edge of Propinquity. (January 15, 2010)
  - Reprint: Sparrow Hill Road (2014)
2. "Train Yard Blues." Coins of Chaos. Hades Publications. (September 30, 2013)
3. "Last Call at the Last Chance." Patreon. (November 1, 2017)
4. "What We Forget, What We Forgive." Patreon. (November 1, 2025)

==== Comics ====
1. "The Girl In The Green Silk Gown" with art by B. Sabo. BSabo.com. (April 2018)

=== Rolling in the Deep [as Mira Grant] (2015) ===
1. Rolling in the Deep. Subterranean Press. (April 6, 2015)
2. Into the Drowning Deep. Orbit Books. (November 14, 2017)

=== Wayward Children (2016) ===
==== Books ====
Published by Tor.com Publishing. (Note: McGuire also narrates the audiobook versions of Down Among the Sticks and Bones and Come Tumbling Down.)

1. Every Heart a Doorway (April 5, 2016)
2. Down Among the Sticks and Bones (June 13, 2017)
3. Beneath the Sugar Sky (January 9, 2018)
4. In an Absent Dream (January 8, 2019)
5. Come Tumbling Down (January 7, 2020)
6. Across the Green Grass Fields (January 12, 2021)
7. Where the Drowned Girls Go (January 4, 2022)
8. Lost in the Moment and Found (January 10, 2023)
9. Mislaid in Parts Half-Known (January 9, 2024)
10. Adrift in Currents Clean and Clear (January 7, 2025)
11. Through Gates of Garnet and Gold (January 6, 2026)
12. A Song of Sugar Sparrows (January 12, 2027)

==== Short fiction ====
1. "Juice Like Wounds." Tor.com. (July 13, 2020)
  - Reprint: September/October 2020 Short Fiction Newsletter. Tor.com. (October 26, 2020)
2. "In Mercy, Rain." Tor.com. (July 18, 2022)
3. "Skeleton Song." Tor.com. (October 26, 2022)

=== Alchemical Journeys (2019) ===
1. Middlegame (May 7, 2019)
2. Seasonal Fears (May 3, 2022)
3. Tidal Creatures (June 6, 2024)
4. Inkpot Gods (June 9, 2026)
5. Asphodel (2028)

=== The Up-and-Under [as A. Deborah Baker] (2020) ===
The Up-and-Under series is published under the pen name of A. Deborah Baker, a fictional character within the Alchemical Journeys series.

==== Books ====
1. Over the Woodward Wall (October 6, 2020)
2. Along the Saltwise Sea (October 12, 2021)
3. Into the Windwracked Wilds (October 25, 2022)
4. Under the Smokestrewn Sky (October 17, 2023)

=== Fighting Pumpkins (2020) ===
==== Collections ====
1. Dying With Her Cheer Pants On: Stories of the Fighting Pumpkins. Subterranean Press. (October 30, 2020)
  - Collects all Fighting Pumpkins stories to date, including three stories not previously published.

==== Short fiction ====
1. "Dying With Her Cheer Pants On." Apex Magazine. (April 7, 2010)
  - Reprint: The Book of Apex: Volume 2 of Apex Magazine (December 1, 2010)
2. "Gimmie a 'Z.'" Zombiesque. DAW Books. (February 11, 2011)
3. "Turn the Year Around." Harvest Season. ISFiC Pressl (November 14, 2014)
4. "Fiber." Unbound. Grim Oak Press. (December 1, 2015)
5. "School Colors." Little Green Men....Attack! Baen Books. (March 7, 2017)
6. "The Golden Girls of Fall." Pop the Clutch: Thrilling Tales of Rockabilly, Monsters, and Hot Rod Horror. Dark Moon Books. (January 14, 2019)
7. "Away Game." The Secret Guide to Fighting Elder Gods. Pulse Publishing. (April 22, 2019)
8. "Tryouts." Dying With Her Cheer Pants On: Stories of the Fighting Pumpkins. (October 30, 2020)
9. "Trial By Fire." Dying With Her Cheer Pants On: Stories of the Fighting Pumpkins. (October 30, 2020)
10. "Compete Me." Dying With Her Cheer Pants On: Stories of the Fighting Pumpkins. (October 30, 2020)

=== Magic: The Gathering (2021) ===
McGuire is a contributing writer for the Magic: the Gathering franchise.

=== Books ===
- Strixhaven: Omens of Chaos (February 16, 2026)

=== Comics ===
- Magic: Ajani Goldmane #1. (August 2022)
- Magic: Nahiri the Lithomancer #1. (November 2022)
- Magic: Soul and Stone. Simon & Schuster. (July 11, 2023)
  - Collecting Magic: Ajani Goldmane #1 and Magic: Nahiri the Lithomancer #1

=== Short Fiction ===
- "Tangles" Magic: The Gathering (November 3, 2021)
- "The Dance of Undeath" Magic: The Gathering (November 24, 2021)
- "Homecoming" Magic: The Gathering (August 12, 2022)
- "Assault on New Phyrexia Episode 1: Uncontrolled Descent" Magic: The Gathering (January 13, 2023)
- "Assault on New Phyrexia Episode 2: Unstable Foundations" Magic: The Gathering (January 13, 2023)
- "Assault on New Phyrexia Episode 3: Inconceivable Losses" Magic: The Gathering (January 14, 2023)
- "Assault on New Phyrexia Episode 4: Impossible Odds" Magic: The Gathering (January 16, 2023)
- "Assault on New Phyrexia Episode 5: Inevitable Resolutions" Magic: The Gathering (January 16, 2023)
- "Murders at Karlov Manor | Episode 1: Ghosts of Our Past" Magic: The Gathering (December 5, 2023)
- "March of the Machine | Innistrad: Family Game Night" Magic: The Gathering (March 22, 2023)
- "Murders at Karlov Manor | Episode 2: Monsters We Became" Magic: The Gathering (January 8, 2024)
- "Murders at Karlov Manor | Episode 3: Shadows of Regret" Magic: The Gathering (January 9, 2024)
- "Murders at Karlov Manor | Episode 4: Justice Before Mercy" Magic: The Gathering (January 10, 2024)
- "Murders at Karlov Manor | Episode 5: Chains of Expectation" Magic: The Gathering (January 11, 2024)
- "Murders at Karlov Manor | Episode 6: Explosions of Genius" Magic: The Gathering (January 12, 2024)
- "Murders at Karlov Manor | Episode 7: Rot before Recovery" Magic: The Gathering (January 15, 2024)
- "Murders at Karlov Manor | Episode 8: Gods of Chaos" Magic: The Gathering (January 16, 2024)
- "Murders at Karlov Manor | Episode 9: Beauty in Destruction" Magic: The Gathering (January 17, 2024)
- "Murders at Karlov Manor | Episode 10: Roots of Decay" Magic: The Gathering (January 18, 2024)
- "Outlaws of Thunder Junction | A Pleasant Family Outing" Magic: The Gathering (March 22, 2024)
- "Duskmourn: House of Horror | Welcome Home" Magic: The Gathering (August 19, 2024, as Mira Grant)
- "Duskmourn: House of Horror | Episode 1: Don't Go Past the Old Dark House" Magic: The Gathering (August 19, 2024, as Mira Grant)
- "Duskmourn: House of Horror | Episode 2: Don't Split the Party" Magic: The Gathering (August 20, 2024, as Mira Grant)
- "Duskmourn: House of Horror | Children of the Carnival, Part 1" Magic: The Gathering (August 21, 2024, as Mira Grant)
- "Duskmourn: House of Horror | Episode 3: Don't Look Back" Magic: The Gathering (August 22, 2024, as Mira Grant)
- "Duskmourn: House of Horror | Children of the Carnival, Part 2" Magic: The Gathering (August 23, 2024, as Mira Grant)
- "Duskmourn: House of Horror | Episode 4: Don't Give Up" Magic: The Gathering (August 26, 2024, as Mira Grant)
- "Duskmourn: House of Horror | Keep Them Alive" Magic: The Gathering (August 27, 2024, as Mira Grant)
- "Duskmourn: House of Horror | Episode 5: Don't Give In" Magic: The Gathering (August 28, 2024, as Mira Grant)
- "Duskmourn: House of Horror | Dead End" Magic: The Gathering (August 29, 2024, as Mira Grant)
- "Duskmourn: House of Horror | Episode 6: Don't Die" Magic: The Gathering (August 30, 2024, as Mira Grant)
- "Duskmourn: House of Horror | It's a Beautiful Day" Magic: The Gathering (August 31, 2024, as Mira Grant)
- "Tarkir: Dragonstorm | Mardu: Where Lightning Tells Our Story" Magic: The Gathering (March 11, 2025)
- "Lorwyn Eclipsed | Out of This Wood" Magic: The Gathering (December 08, 2025)
- "Lorwyn Eclipsed | Shake Off Slumber" Magic: The Gathering (December 09, 2025)
- "Lorwyn Eclipsed | Aweary of this Moon" Magic: The Gathering (December 10, 2025)
- "Lorwyn Eclipsed | Fetch Me That Flower" Magic: The Gathering (December 11, 2025)
- "Lorwyn Eclipsed | If We Shadows" Magic: The Gathering (December 12, 2025)
- "Lorwyn Eclipsed | Full of Hateful Fantasies" Magic: The Gathering (December 15, 2025)
- "Lorwyn Eclipsed | The Charm Dissolves Apace" Magic: The Gathering (December 16, 2025)

== Other books ==
=== Novels ===
- Indigo. St. Martin's Press (June 20, 2017)
  - Collaborative novel with Charlaine Harris, Christopher Golden, Kelley Armstrong, Jonathan Maberry, Kat Richardson, Tim Lebbon, Cherie Priest, James A. Moore and Mark Morris.
- Deadlands: Boneyard. Tor Books (October 17, 2017)
- Alien: Echo [as Mira Grant] Imprint Books. (April 9, 2019)
- Overwatch: Declassified. Blizzard Entertainment (October 10, 2023)
- What If...Wanda Maximoff and Peter Parker Were Siblings? A Scarlet Witch and Spider-Man Story Marvel Comics / Random House (July 9, 2024)
- Overgrowth [as Mira Grant]. Tor Nightfire. (May 6, 2025)

=== Novellas ===
- Dusk or Dark or Dawn or Day. Tor Books (January 10, 2017)
- Final Girls [as Mira Grant]. Subterranean Press. (April 2017, ISBN 9781596068230.)
- Kingdom of Needle and Bone [as Mira Grant]. Subterranean Press. (December 2018, ISBN 9781596068711.)
- In the Shadow of Spindrift House [as Mira Grant]. Subterranean Press. (July 2019, ISBN 9781596069220.)
- Square³ [as Mira Grant]. Subterranean Press. (December 2021.)
- Unbreakable [as Mira Grant]. Subterranean Press. (2022)

=== Collections ===
- When Will You Rise: Stories to End the World [as Mira Grant]. Subterranean Press. (October 2012, ISBN 9781596064621.)
- Letters to the Pumpkin King. NESFA Press. (February 14, 2014)
- Laughter at the Academy. Subterranean Press (October 31, 2019)
- Apocalypse Scenarios: These are the Ways the World Ends [as Mira Grant]. Subterranean Press. (2022)
- The Proper Thing and Other Stories. Subterranean Press. (2024)

=== As editor ===
- Queers Destroy Science Fiction Special Issue. Lightspeed Magazine (June 2015)

== Comics ==
=== Spider-Gwen ===
Starring Spider-Gwen Stacy, the Spider-Woman of Earth-65, launched as part of the Spider-Geddon storyline, finding herself trapped in a parallel dimension as her friends and fellow Spiders are dying.

==== Collected editions. ====
- Spider-Gwen: Ghost-Spider Vol. 1: Spider-Geddon (May 8, 2019)
- Spider-Gwen: Ghost-Spider Vol. 2: Impossible Year (September 4, 2019)
- Ghost-Spider Vol. 1: Dog Days Are Over (February 5, 2020)
- Ghost-Spider Vol. 2: Party People (December 23, 2020)
- King in Black: Gwenom vs. Carnage (July 28, 2021)

=== Other Marvel Comics ===
McGuire is a contributing writer in these collected Marvel works.

- X-Men: Gold Annual #2. (October 2017)
- X-Men Black #3: Mystique #1. (October 17, 2018)
- Marvel Super Hero Adventures: (2018) Captain Marvel. (January 2019)
- Marvel Universe: Time and Again (February 12, 2019)
- Age of X-Man: The Amazing Nightcrawler (August 28, 2019)
- Fearless (December 10, 2019)

=== Other non-Marvel Comics ===
McGuire is a contributing writer in these collected works.

- The Best Thing Issue 01-12. (2015)
- Can I Pet Your Werewolf. (October 2017)
- Lumberjanes: Campfire Songs. (June 2020)
- Jim Henson Presents #1 (Of 4). (December 4, 2024)
- Jim Henson Presents #2 (Of 4). (January 15, 2025)
- Jim Henson Presents #3 (Of 4). (April 16, 2025)
- Jim Henson Presents #4 (Of 4). (May 21, 2025)
- Jim Henson Presents TPB. (November 11, 2025)

== Poetry ==
=== Poetry collections ===
- "Leaves from the Babylon Wood." Limited-issue chapbook (2005)
  - Reprint: Letters to the Pumpkin King (October 2014)
- "Paths Through The Babylon Wood." Limited-issue chapbook (2009)
  - Reprint: Letters to the Pumpkin King (October 2014)

=== Individual poems ===
- "Mystery." Speculon (June 2002)
- "Persephone's Daughter. " Branches Quarterly (January 2004)
- "Ever After Variations." Goblin Fruit (Spring 2010)
- "Clockwork Chickens." Apex Magazine (June 2011)
- "Post-Modern Cinderella." Goblin Fruit (Summer 2011)
- "Wounds." Apex Magazine (June 2012)
- "Graveyard Rose." Apex Magazine (May 2014)
- "The Right of It." Goblin Fruit (Winter 2014)
- "Ghosts." The Reinvented Detective (December 12, 2023)

== Essays ==
- "Thoughts On Writing." #1-#48. Aphelion Webzine (2008-2013)
- "Mathematical Excellence." Chicks Dig Time Lords (March 2010)
- "Introduction." In A Gilded Light (Jennifer Brozek, September 2010)
- "The Girls Next Door: Learning to Live With the Living Dead and Never Even Break a Nail." Whedonistas (March 2011)
- "Introduction." Showtime (Narrelle M. Harris, March 2012)
- "Summers and Winters, Frost and Flame." Chicks Dig Comics (April 10, 2012)
- "Waiting for the Doctor: The Women of Series Five." Chicks Unravel Time (November 1, 2012)
- "Afterward, Jim Hines: The Wizard We Deserve." The Goblin Master's Grimoire (November 8, 2013)
- "Forward." Speculative Fiction 2013: The Years Best Online Reviews, Essays and Commentary (April 2014)
- "Introduction." Indistinguishable From Magic (May 2014)
- "Cybernetic Space Princess from Mars" Letters to the Pumpkin King (October 2014)
  - Reprint: Altered Perceptions (October 2014)
- "How I Learned to Stop Worrying and Love the Numbers: A Girl, a Rulebook, and Arithmetic." Chicks Dig Gaming (November 2014)
- "That Nitro-9 That You're Not Carrying: Violence and the Companion." Companion Piece (April 2015)
- "Neat Things." Letters to Tiptree (August 2015)
  - Reprint: The Long List Anthology Volume 2 (December 10, 2016)
- "Introduction." Bloodstones (August 2015)
- "Where to Start with Portal Fantasies." The Book Smugglers’ Quarterly Almanac: Volume 2 (September 2016)
- "The Secret Language of Fanfic." Loose Lips (September 2016)
- "The Importance of Nailing Down Your Process." Signature's 2018 Compact Guide to Writing Short Stories (2018)
- "The Bodies of the Girls Who Made Me." Tor.com (April 2018)
  - Reprint: Rocket Fuel: Some of the Best From Tor.com Non-Fiction (July 2018)
- "Forward & Two Arguments." Geek Versus Geek (January 2019)
- "Introduction." Atomic Robo and the Dawn of A New Era (July 2019)
- "My Little Pony broke all of the ‘girl toy’ rules." Polygon.com (November 2020)
- "Wonder Woman 1984 gives a bright hero a questionable dark turn." Polygon.com (December 2020)
- "Introduction." Dumbing of Age: Tenth Book Collection (2021)

== Albums ==
McGuire self-publishes her music as physical CDs. Their availability cycles in and out of print.

- Pretty Little Dead Girl: Seanan McGuire and Friends Live at OVFF 2005 (2006)
- Stars Fall Home (2007)
- Red Roses and Dead Things (2009)
- Wicked Girls (2011)
- Creature Feature (2015)

== Short fiction ==
Excludes titles listed as part of a series.

=== 2008 ===
- "Let's Pretend." The Edge of Propinquity (November 2008)

=== 2009 ===
- "Lost." Ravens in the Library - Magic in the Bard's Name (March 2009)
  - Reprint: Lightspeed Magazine (June 2012)
  - Reprint: Laughter at the Academy (October 2019)
- "Animal Husbandry." Grants Pass (August 2009)
  - Reprint: Wastelands 2 (February 24, 2015)
- "Anthony's Vampire." Book View Cafe (August 2009)
  - Republished in Nightmare Magazine (July 2016)
- "Knives." Book View Cafe (August 2009)
- "Changing Meanings." Book View Cafe (August 2009)
- "Lady of the Tides." Book View Cafe (August 2009)
- "A Citizen in Childhood's Country." Book View Cafe (August 2009)
  - Reprint: You Want Stories? The JordanCon 2019 Anthology (2019)
- "Julie Broise and the Devil" Night-Mantled: The Best of Wily Writers (October 2009)
- "Inspirations." The Edge of Propinquity (October 2009)
  - Reprint: Nightmare Magazine (February 2016)

=== 2011 ===
- "The Tolling of Pavlov's Bells" Apex Magazine (January 2011)
  - Reprint: Laughter at the Academy (October 2019)
- "The Alchemy of Alcohol" After Hours: Tales from the Ur-Bar (March 2011)
- "Apocalypse Scenario #683: The Box." Orbit Short Fiction Program (April 2011)
- "Riddles" Human Tales (April 2011)
- "Uncle Sam" The Edge of Propinquity (October 2011)
  - Reprint: Laughter at the Academy (October 2019)
- "Cinderella City" Human For a Day (December 2011)
- "Crystal Holloway and the Forgotten Passage" Fantasy Magazine (December 2011)
  - Reprint: Other Worlds Than These (June 26, 2012)
  - Reprint: Laughter at the Academy (October 2019)

=== 2012 ===
- "Lady of the Water" River (December 2012)
- "We Will Not Be Undersold" The Modern Fae's Guide to Surviving Humanity (March 2012)

=== 2013 ===
- "Laughter at the Academy" The Mad Scientist’s Guide to World Domination (February 2013)
  - Reprint: Laughter at the Academy (October 2019)
- "Emeralds to Emeralds, Dust to Dust" Oz Reimagined (February 2013)
  - Reprint: Laughter at the Academy (October 2019)
- "Daughter of the Midway, The Mermaid, And the Open, Lonely Sea" Carniepunk (July 2013)
- "Hook Agonistes" Subterranean Magazine (September 2013)
- "Homecoming" Lightspeed Magazine (September 2013)
  - Reprint: Laughter at the Academy (October 2019)
- "Midway Relics and Dying Breeds" METAtropolis 3: Green Space (October 15, 2013)
  - Reprint: Tor.com (September 2014)
- "Frontier ABCs The Life and Times of Charity Smith, Schoolteacher" Raygun Chronicles (November 2013)
  - Reprint: Infinite Stars: Dark Frontiers: The Definitive Anthology of Space Opera (November 5, 2019)
  - Reprint: Laughter at the Academy (October 2019)

=== 2014 ===
- "Spores" Fungal Apocalypse (February 2014)
  - Reprint: The End is Nigh (March 1, 2014)
  - Reprint: Body Shocks: Extreme Tales of Body Horror (October 19, 2021)
- "We are All Misfit Toys in the Aftermath of the Velveteen War" Robot Uprisings (April 2014)
  - Reprint: Laughter at the Academy (October 2019)
- "Knit a Sweater Out of Sky" Dead But Not Forgotten (May 2014)
- "Each to Each" Lightspeed Magazine (June 2014)
  - Reprint: The Best American Science Fiction and Fantasy 2015 (October 6, 2016)
  - Reprint: Laughter at the Academy (October 2019)
- "Bring About the Halloween Eternal!!!" HELP FUND MY ROBOT ARMY!!! And Other Improbable Crowdfunding Projects (July 2014)
  - Reprint: Laughter at the Academy (October 2019)
- "The Lambs" Bless Your Mechanical Heart (July 2014)
  - Reprint: Laughter at the Academy (October 2019)
- "Office Memos" Shamrockon Souvenir (August 2014)
  - Reprint: Laughter at the Academy (October 2019)
- "In Roses" Popular Science Magazine (August 2014)
- "Lady Antheia's Guide to Horticultural Warfare" Clockwork Universe: Steampunk vs. Aliens (September 2014)
  - Reprint: Lightspeed Magazine (February 2017)
  - Reprint: Laughter at the Academy (October 2019)
- "Fruiting Bodies" The End is Now (September 2014)
- "Best Served Cold" Street of Shadows (September 2014)
- "Driving Jenny Home" Out of Tune (November 2014)
  - Reprint: Far Out: Recent Queer Science Fiction and Fantasy (July 27, 2021)
  - Reprint: Laughter at the Academy (October 2019)

=== 2015 ===
- "There Is No Place For Sorrow in the Kingdom of the Cold" The Doll Collection (March 2015)
  - Reprint: The Dark Issue (July 14, 2016)
  - Reprint: Laughter at the Academy (October 2019)
- "In Skeleton Leaves" Operation Arcana (March 3, 2015)
  - Reprint: Laughter at the Academy (October 2019)
- "Resistance" The End Has Come (May 2015)
- "The Happiest Place..." The End Has Come (May 2015)
  - Reprint: Wastelands 2: More Stories of the Apocalypse (February 24, 2015)
- "The Moon Inside" Midian Unmade: Tales of Clive Barker's Nightbreed (July 2015)
- "The Myth of Rain" Lightspeed Magazine (August 2015)
  - Reprint: Loosed upon the World: The Saga Anthology of Climate Fiction (September 15, 2015)
- "Reading Lists" Temporarily Out of Order (August 2015)
- "Into the Green" Bloodlines (October 2015)
- "Something Lost, Something Gained" Seize the Night (August 2015)
- "Hello, Hello" Future Visions: Original Science Fiction Inspired by Microsoft (November 2015)
  - Reprint: Lightspeed Magazine (September 2019)
- "Down, Deep Down, Below the Waves." The Gods of HP Lovecraft (December 2015)

=== 2016 ===
- "We Are the Shadows Cast by the Memory of Giants" Truth Beyond Paradox (February 2016)
- "Dragonflies" The Doomsday Chronicles (March 2016)
- "Ye Highlands and Ye Lowlands" Uncanny Magazine (May 2016)
- "The Jaws That Bite, The Claws That Catch" Lightspeed Magazine (May 2016)
  - Reprint: Futures & Fantasies (December 8, 2018)
- "Something in the Rain" Defying Doomsday (May 30, 2016)
- "Long Way Down" Genius Loci (June 7, 2016)
- "Regulations" Galactic Games (June 7, 2016)
- "Threnody for Little Girl, With Tuna, At the End of the World" Patreon (July 1, 2016)
  - Reprint: Nightmare Magazine (July 2019)
  - Reprint: Laughter at the Academy (October 2019)
- "Opening Band" The PaulandStormonomicon (July 8, 2016)
- "Inch by Inch and Row by Row" Limbus Inc, Volume III (July 29, 2016)
- "The Levee Was Dry" Patreon (August 1, 2016)
- "Round and Round We Ride the Carousel of Time" Alien Artifacts (September 15, 2016)
- "Best in Show" Were- (September 16, 2016)
- "Sincerity (Gatsby)" Loose Lips (September 27, 2016)
- "In the Desert Like a Bone" The Starlit Wood (October 2016)
- "#Connollyhouse #Weshouldntbehere / Forbidden Texts" What the #@&% Is That? (November 2016)
  - Reprint: Laughter at the Academy (October 2019)
- "In the Before, When Legends Were True" Patreon (November 1, 2016)
- "Be Still, and Listen" The Grimm Future (November 1, 2016)
- "And Men Will Mine the Mountain for Our Souls" Unfettered III (November 21, 2016)
- "Falls Like Snow" Patreon (December 1, 2016)

=== 2017 ===
- "Please Accept My Most Profound Apologies About to Happen (But You Started It)" Jurassic Chronicles (January 27, 2017)
  - Reprint: Laughter at the Academy (October 2019)
- "The Heart Never Came Down Again" Patreon (February 1, 2017)
- "The Mathematical Inevitability of Corvids" Black Feathers (February 7, 2017)
- "Carry On" Patreon (March 1, 2017)
  - Reprint: Nightmare Magazine (March 2019)
- "Magical Girls" Chapbook from Magical Girls of Urban Fantasy Tour (March 2, 2017)
  - Reprint: Patreon
- "Persephone" Tor.com (March 8, 2017)
  - Reprint: Nevertheless, She Persisted: Flash Fiction Project (March 8, 2020)
- "Bring The Kids and Revisit the Past at the Retro Funfair" Cosmic Powers (April 18, 2017)
- "The Great Tarantula Migration of 1972" Strange California (April 22, 2017)
- "Graffiti of the Lost and Dying Places" Dark Cities (May 2017)
- "Pedestal" Behind the Mask (May 16, 2017)
- "Cabbages and Kings" Patreon (June 1, 2017)
- "How the Maine Coon Cat Learned to Love the Sea" Uncanny Magazine (July 2017)
- "From A to Z in the Book of Changes" Patreon (July 1, 2017)
  - Reprint: Laughter at the Academy (October 2019)
- "You Can Stay All Day" Nights of the Living Dead (July 11, 2017)
  - Reprint: The Best of the Best Horror of the Year: 10 Years of Essential Short Horror Fiction (October 2, 2018)
- "Pixie Season" Lawless Lands (July 20, 2017)
- "Burning Girls" Hellboy: An Assortment of Horrors (August 29, 2017)
- "Heroes Never Die" All Hail Our Robot Conquerors (September 1, 2017)
- "Rest in Peace" Submerged (September 1, 2017)
- "Heart of Straw" Patreon (October 1, 2017)
- "With Graveyard Weeds and Wolfsbane Seeds" Haunted Nights (October 3, 2017)
  - Reprint: Nightmare Magazine (November 2019)
- "Blood and Sand" Predator: If It Bleeds (October 17, 2017)
- "Red Dirt" Jon Ledger: Unstoppable (October 31, 2017)
- "What We Knew Then, Before the Sky Fell Down" Catalysts, Explorers & Secret Keepers: Women of Science Fiction (November 14, 2017)
- "River of Stars" Children of a Different Sky (November 17, 2017)
- "An Emptied Vessel" Hardboiled Horror (November 23, 2017)
- "The Wine in Dreams" Star Wars: Canto Bight (December 5, 2017)
- "Sentence Like a Saturday" Mad Hatters and March Hares (December 12, 2017)
- "By Promise Preordained" The Demon Kings of Solomon (December 15, 2017)

=== 2018 ===
- "Build Me a Wonderland" Robots vs. Fairies (January 9, 2018)
- "Now Rest, My Dear" Patreon (March 1, 2018)
- "Sister, Dearest Sister, Let Me Show to You the Sea" The Devil and the Deep (March 20, 2018)
- "Goodnight Sleep Tight" Patreon (May 1, 2018)
- "Rise up, Rise Up, You Children of the Moon" The Razor's Edge (June 15, 2018)
- "Harvest" Patreon (July 1, 2018)
- "Swear Not By the Moon" Infinity's End (July 1, 2018)
  - Reprint: Lightspeed Magazine (April 2021)
- "Riding Ever Southward, In The Company of Bees" Hath No Fury (August 23, 2018)
- "File and Forget" Patreon (September 1, 2018)
- "Mother, Mother, With Your Play With Me" Mother of Invention (September 1, 2018)
- "Remember the Green." Shades With Us: Tales of Migration and Fractured Borders (September 8, 2018)
- "Falling's Free, Gravity Costs." Unidentified Funny Objects 7. (September 25, 2018)
- "Home and Hope Both Sound a Little Bit Like 'Hunger.'" Chiral Mad 4. (October 23, 2018, with Jennifer Brozek)
- "Fresh as the New-Fallen Snow." Hark! The Herald Angels Scream. (October 23, 2018)
- "Love in the Last Days of a Doomed World" Patreon (November 1, 2018)
- "Under the Sea of Stars" Lightspeed Magazine. (December 27, 2018)

=== 2019 ===
- "Sweet as Sugar Candy" Patreon (January 1, 2019)
- "On This Side" Patreon (February 1, 2019)
- "Harmony." A People's Future of the United States. (February 5, 2019)
- "But We Were Heroes Once, in Empty Places, After Dark." The Gamer Chronicles. (February `5, 2019)
- "Emergency Landing" Patreon (March 1, 2019)
- "Stripes in the Sunset." Unfettered III. (March 1, 2019)
- "What Everyone Knows" Kaiju Rising 2: Reign of Monsters (April 1, 2019)
  - Reprint: The Best American Science Fiction and Fantasy 2019
- "Vegetables and Vaccines" Patreon (May 1, 2019)
- "Face Your Furs" Patreon (June 1, 2019)
  - Reprint: Surviving Tomorrow: A charity anthology to fight COVID-19 (November 11, 2020)
- "Any Way the Wind Blows" Tor.com (June 5, 2019)
- "So Sharp, So Bright, So Final." Wastelands: The New Apocalypse. (June 5, 2019)
- "Come Marching In" Patreon (August 1, 2019)
- "Must Be This Tall to Ride." Echoes: The Saga Anthology of Ghost Stories. (August 20th, 2019)
- "Phantoms of the Midway". The Mythic Dream. (September 3rd, 2019)
- "Help Wanted" Patreon (December 1, 2019)

=== 2020 ===
- "Malpractice" Predators in Petticoats (March 2020)
- ""Another Beautiful Day" Patreon (March 1, 2020)
- "In the Land of Rainbows and Ash" Patreon (April 1, 2020)
- "Foundational Education" The Darkling Halls of Ivy (May 2020)
- "See a Fine Lady" Where the Veil is Thin (May 2020)
- "The Proper Thing" Patreon (May 1, 2020)
- "Opt-In" Ignorance is Strength (June 2020)
- "Conscription" Burn the Ashes (June 2020)
- "Recovery" Or Else the Light (June 2020)
- "Look at the Water, How it Sparkles" Shattering Glass (June 16, 2020)
- "Ratting" Patreon (July 1, 2020)
- "Hoard" The Book of Dragons (July 7, 2020)
- "Coafield’s Catalog of Available Apocalypse Events" Apocalyptic (August 2020)
- "Belief" Patreon (September 1, 2020)
- "In Silent Streams, Where Once the Summer Shone" Shapers of Worlds (September 22, 2020)
- "Too Late Now" Weird Tales #354 (November 11, 2020)

=== 2021 ===
- "Inflatable Angel." Patreon (February 1, 2021)
- "Riparian." MermaidsMonthly.com (June 11, 2021)
- "Pygmalion." Unmasked: Tales of Risk and Revelation (July 7, 2021)
- "Conflation." Patreon (August 1, 2021)
- "Knock Three Times," There Is No Death, There Are No Dead: Tales of Spiritualism Horror (August 27, 2021)
- "In the Deep Woods; The Light is Different There" When Things Get Dark: Stories Inspired by Shirley Jackson (November 21, 2021)
  - Reprint: Lightspeed Magazine (January 2023)
- "Finals" Schoolbooks and Sorcery (October 21, 2021)
- "On the Cold Hill Side" Lost Worlds & Mythological Kingdoms (November 16, 2021)
- "Until Persephone Comes Home." Patreon (December 1, 2021)
- "Planting and Harvest." Aliens vs. Predators - AVP: ULTIMATE PREY (December 14, 2021)
- "Treatment Plan" Vital: The Future of Healthcare (December 31, 2021)

=== 2022 ===
- "Retrospect" The Reinvented Heart (February 8, 2022)
- "Ghost Lights" Patreon (March 1, 2022)
- "Wrong Story." 99 Tiny Terrors (March 23, 2022)
- "Those Three Girls from Rush's Bend" Patreon (April 1, 2022)
- "First Aid." Someone in Time: Tales of Time-Crossed Romance (May 2022)
- "The War Comes Home." Patreon (June 1, 2022)
- "“Can” Doesn't Mean “Should”." Classic Monsters Unleashed (July 12, 2022)
- "Collagen" Close to Midnight (October 18, 2022)

=== 2023 ===
- "How Much Harm?" Patreon (January 1, 2023)
- "Whalefall" Patreon (February 1, 2023)
- "Content/Consent" Patreon (March 1, 2023)
- "Nine" Instinct: An Animal Rescuers Anthology (March 7, 2023)
- "Uncrowned Kings" The Hitherto Secret Experiments of Marie Curie (April 11, 2023)
- "Slipping" Patreon (May 1, 2023)
- "Perfection" Robots Through The Ages (July 25, 2023)
- "The Votress’s Daughter" Shakespeare Unleashed (July 28, 2023)
- "Hot New Toy" Patreon (August 1, 2023)
- "Frog" Lofty Mountains (October 10, 2023)
- "Well, That Escalated Quickly" The Four ???? of the Apocalypse (October 20, 2023)

=== 2024 ===
- "Not a Drop to Drink" Patreon February 1, 2024)
  - "Believe Me When I Sing The Moon’s Return." 99 Fleeting Fantasies (February 15, 2022)
- "A Traveler's Guide to Fantastical Countries" Patreon (March 1, 2024)
- "Special" Wink (June 25, 2024)
- "The Girl Who Loved Peacocks" Patreon (July 1, 2024)
- "Taste Your Future at Sincerity's Singular Scoop Shop" Patreon (October 1, 2024)

=== 2025 ===
- "What's Fair to Offer in Exchange" Patreon (June 1, 2025)
- "Streams of Silver, Streams of Gold" Grimoire: A Grim Oak Press Anthology For ECCC 2025 (August 20, 2025)
- "Insert Disk Two" Grimoire: A Grim Oak Press Anthology For Seattle Worldcon 2025 (August 20, 2025)
- "Infringement" Patreon (December 1, 2025)

=== 2026 ===
- "In Stone and Salt and Silence" Waterborne (January 27, 2026)
- "Legacies" Waterborne (February 1, 2026)
- "Let Sirens Sing Your Name" Patreon (June 1, 2026)
