= Wayward Children =

Series of fantasy novels by Seanan McGuire

- Every Heart a Doorway (2016); Down Among the Sticks and Bones (2017); Beneath the Sugar Sky (2018); In an Absent Dream (2019); Come Tumbling Down (2020); Across the Green Grass Fields (2021); Where the Drowned Girls Go (2022); Lost in the Moment and Found (2023); Mislaid in Parts Half-Known (2024); Adrift in Currents Clean and Clear (2025); Through Gates of Garnet and Gold (2026)
- Author: Seanan McGuire
- Cover artist: Rovina Cai
- Country: United States
- Language: English
- Genre: Fantasy
- Publisher: Tor.com
- Published: 2016-Present
- No. of books: 11
- Website: seananmcguire.com

Wayward Children is a series of fantasy novellas by American author Seanan McGuire. It takes place at a boarding school for children who have journeyed to magical lands and been forcibly returned to the real world. The volumes alternate between being set at the school versus showing the lives of the children while they were in their alternate worlds.

In 2022, the series won the Hugo Award for Best Series.

== Main characters ==
- Antoinette "Antsy" Ricci: the protagonist of Lost in the Moment and Found and a main character in Mislaid in Parts Half-Known. After her father's death, she escapes her step-father's abuse and finds herself in the Shop Where the Lost Things Go. She has bright red hair and is described as squirmy, rowdy, and happy.
- Christopher Flores: a main character in Beneath the Sugar Sky and Mislaid in Parts Half-Known. He lived in the skeleton world of Mariposa before arriving at the Home for Wayward Children. He is of Mexican descent.
- Cora Miller: the protagonist of Where the Drowned Girls Go and a main character in Beneath the Sugar Sky, Come Tumbling Down, and Mislaid in Parts Half-Known. She lived in the Trenches, after which she developed blue hair and sparkling skin. She is short, round, and athletic, and she experienced a lot of bullying due to her weight and later her hair.
- Eleanor West: the proprietor of Eleanor West's Home for Wayward Children, a boarding school for children who have journeyed to magical lands and been forcibly returned to the real world.
- Kade Bronson/West: related to Eleanor West, Kade helps care for the Home for Wayward Children and is a main character in Every Heart a Doorway, Beneath the Sugar Sky, and Mislaid in Parts Half-Known. He lived in Prism, a world with goblins and fairies, before the world learned he broke the rules, given that it only allows girls to be heroes. Kade is transgender. Kade manages the school's wardrobe and is an accomplished tailor.
- Katherine Lundy: the protagonist of In an Absent Dream and a character in Every Heart a Doorway. She lived in the Goblin Market, where everything was traded for Fair Value. After returning to Earth, she ages in reverse.
- Nadezhda "Nadya" Sokolov: the protagonist of Adrift in Currents Clean and Clear and a main character in Beneath the Sugar Sky. She lived in Belyyreka, a water world. Nadya was born in Russia and adopted by American parents. She was born missing the lower part of her right arm.
- Nancy Whitman: the protagonist of Every Heart a Doorway and Through Gates of Garnet and Gold, as well as a main character in Beneath the Sugar Sky. She lived in and returned to the Halls of the Dead, where she stands as still as a statue. Nancy is asexual.
- Onishi Sumi: a main character in Every Heart a Doorway, Where the Drowned Girls Go, and Mislaid in the Parts Half-Known. She lived in Confection, a candy world. In Beneath the Sugar Sky, she is resurrected after the Baker in Confection remakes her out of gingerbread. Sumi is described as being of Japanese descent and has a daughter, Rini, in the future.
- Jacqueline "Jack" and Jillian "Jill" Wolcott: twin sisters who appear in Every Heart a Doorway, Down Among the Sticks and Bones, and Come Tumbling Down. On the other side of their door is the Moors, a world of vampires and mad scientists; there, Jack trains under Dr. Bleak, and Jill is daughter to the Master. Jack has obsessive–compulsive disorder.
- Regan Lewis: the protagonist of Across the Green Grass Fields and a main character in Where the Drowned Girls Go. She discovers a magical portal to a land filled with centaurs, unicorns, and other equine creatures. Regan is intersex.

== Books ==
1. Every Heart a Doorway (2016)
2. Down Among the Sticks and Bones (2017)
3. Beneath the Sugar Sky (2018)
4. In an Absent Dream (2019)
5. Come Tumbling Down (2020)
6. Across the Green Grass Fields (2021)
7. Where the Drowned Girls Go (2022)
8. Lost in the Moment and Found (2023)
9. Mislaid in Parts Half-Known (2024)
10. Adrift in Currents Clean and Clear (2025)
11. Through Gates of Garnet and Gold (2026)
12. A Song of Sugar Sparrows (Jan. 2027)

== Short stories ==
- "Juice Like Wounds" Tor.com (July 13, 2020)
- "In Mercy, Rain" Tor.com (July 18, 2022)
- "Skeleton Song" Tor.com (October 26, 2022)

== Awards and recognition ==
Locus has regularly included the Wayward Children books in their year-end list of the best novellas of the year, including Every Heart a Doorway (2016), Down Among the Sticks and Bones (2017), Come Tumbling Down (2020), and Lost in the Moment and Found (2023). The American Library Association selected Every Heart a Doorway for their 2017 Rainbow Book List.

In 2017, Booklist included Down Among the Sticks and Bones on their list of the year's top ten science fiction and fantasy books.

Awards for the Wayward Children series
Year	Work	Award	Result	Ref
2016	Every Heart a Doorway	Goodreads Choice Award for Fantasy	Nominated	
2016	Every Heart a Doorway	Nebula Award for Best Novella	Won	
2016	Every Heart a Doorway	Tiptree Award	Honor	
2017	Every Heart a Doorway	Alex Awards	Won	
2017	Every Heart a Doorway	British Fantasy Award for Best Novella	Nominated	
2017	Every Heart a Doorway	Hugo Award for Best Novella	Won	
2017	Every Heart a Doorway	Locus Award for Best Novella	Won	
2017	Every Heart a Doorway	World Fantasy Award for Novella	Nominated	
2018	Every Heart a Doorway	Geffen Award for Best Translated Fantasy Book	Nominated	
2018	Down Among the Sticks and Bones	Alex Awards	Won	
2018	Down Among the Sticks and Bones	Hugo Award for Best Novella	Nominated	
2018	Down Among the Sticks and Bones	Locus Award for Best Novella	Nominated	
2018	Down Among the Sticks and Bones	RUSA Award for Fantasy	Won	
2018	Beneath the Sugar Sky	Goodreads Choice Award for Fantasy	Nominated	
2019	Beneath the Sugar Sky	BooktubeSFF Award for Short Work	Nominated	
2019	Beneath the Sugar Sky	Hugo Award for Best Novella	Nominated	
2019	Beneath the Sugar Sky	World Fantasy Award for Novella	Nominated	
2020	In an Absent Dream	Hugo Award for Best Novella	Nominated	
2020	In an Absent Dream	World Fantasy Award for Novella	Nominated	
2021	Come Tumbling Down	Hugo Award for Best Novella	Nominated	
2021	Come Tumbling Down	Locus Award for Best Novella	Nominated	
2022	Across the Green Grass Fields	Hugo Award for Best Novella	Nominated	
2022	Wayward Children	Hugo Award for Best Series	Won	
2023	“In Mercy, Rain"	Locus Award for Best Novelette	Nominated	
2023	Where the Drowned Girls Go	Hugo Award for Best Novella	Won	
2024	Lost in the Moment and Found	Locus Award for Best Novella	Nominated	
2025	Mislaid in Parts Half-Known	Locus Award for Best Novella	Nominated	

== Film adaptation ==
In July 2021, Paramount Pictures acquired the film rights to the Wayward Children series.

== Book ban ==
In 2023, Every Heart a Doorway was banned in Clay County District Schools, Florida and removed from school libraries in Duval County Public Schools, with pending review for upcoming school years.
