= We Print the Truth =

"We Print The Truth" is a 1943 science fiction/fantasy short story by Anthony Boucher. It was first published in Astounding Science Fiction, in December 1943.

== Synopsis ==
When editor John McVeagh is offered a gift by a supernatural being, he asks that his newspaper only ever print the truth. This has consequences beyond what he could have imagined.

== Reception ==
"We Print the Truth" was a finalist for the 1944 Retro Hugo for Best Novella.

In his 2015 review of Boucher's work, Jeffrey Marks noted the presence of Boucher's thematic "passions": religion (the story begins with characters discussing "God's love for truth and the responsibility of humans to record that truth") and mystery (the first section of the story involves a murder investigation — which, Marks emphasizes, is "sensational, but not remotely science fiction"). Writing for The Encyclopedia of Fantasy, Brian Stableford called it "moralistic" and "perhaps [Boucher's] finest work".
