= Beneath the Sugar Sky =

2018 fantasy novella by Seanan McGuire

- Cover of first edition
- Author: Seanan McGuire
- Language: English
- Series: Wayward Children
- Genre: Fantasy
- Publisher: Tor.com
- Publication date: January 2018
- Publication place: United States
- ISBN: 978-0-7653-9358-6
- Preceded by: Down Among the Sticks and Bones
- Followed by: In an Absent Dream

Beneath the Sugar Sky is a 2018 fantasy novella by American author Seanan McGuire. It is the third book in the Wayward Children series and introduces Rini Onishi, the child of Sumi, who was murdered in the series's first book, Every Heart a Doorway.

== Plot ==
Beneath the Sugar Sky begins at Eleanor West's School for Wayward Children as the school's day-to-day activities are interrupted with the arrival of Rini Onishi, who claims to be Sumi's child, despite the fact that Sumi was previously murdered and did not have a child at the time of her death. Rini explains that Sumi grew older and had a family in the world of Confection. However, because of Sumi's death on Earth, Rini and other family members are disintegrating as they are dependent on Sumi's now non-existent future. As such, classmates Christopher, Kade, Cora, and Nadya venture out to revive Sumi and in the process, save her future family in the world of Confection.

== Characters ==
- Christopher Flores: a student who lived in the skeleton world of Mariposa before arriving at the Home for Wayward Children.
- Cora Miller: a student who lived in the underwater world of the Trenches before arriving at the Home for Wayward Children.
- Eleanor West: the proprietor of Eleanor West’s Home for Wayward Children, a boarding school for children who have journeyed to magical lands and been forcibly returned to the real world.
- Kade Bronson: a student who lived in Prism, a world with fairies and goblins, before arriving at the Home for Wayward Children.
- Lady of Shadows: the wife of the Lord of the Dead.
- Layla: the current baker who creates everything in Confection.
- Nadya: a student who lived in Belyyreka before arriving at the Home for Wayward Children.
- Lord of the Dead: ruler of the Land of the Dead and the husband of the Lady of Shadows
- Nancy Whitman: a student who lived in the Halls of the Dead before arriving at the Home for Wayward Children.
- Ponder: Sumi's future husband in Confection.
- Queen of Cakes: antagonist in Confection
- Onishi Rini: Sumi's daughter from Confection.
- Onishi Sumi: a student who lived in the sugary world of Confection before arriving at the Home for Wayward Children.

== Reception ==
=== Reviews ===
Beneath the Sugar Sky received starred reviews from Booklist and Kirkus Reviews.

In a starred review, Booklist's Erin Downey Howerton called Beneath the Sugar Sky "phenomenal" and highlighted the character of Cora as the story's "true standout", given "her keen sense of observation and quiet bravery". Downey Howerton also discussed how "McGuire suggests entire universes in a few spare sentences," as well as how "the delightfully diverse cast of characters is similarly conjured".

Publishers Weekly referred to the novel as "a lush, darkly whimsical adventure full of wonders" and indicated that "readers will be thrilled to see old friends and meet new ones in this scrumptious tale that emphasizes acceptance, kindness, and the enduring value of friendship."

AudioFile reviewed the audiobook, writing, "Michelle Dockrey's smooth narration invites listeners to jump into this third installment of the Wayward Children series". They highlighted how "Dockrey ably portrays the confusion and wonder of new student Cora, whose perspective anchors the story, while also deepening the characterizations of Cora's companions--most notably Rini, who is all high-pitched, petulant insistence".

=== Awards and honors ===
Awards for McGuire's writing
Year	Award	Result	Ref
2019	BooktubeSFF Award for Short Work	Nominated	
2019	Hugo Award for Best Novella	Nominated	
2019	World Fantasy Award for Novella	Nominated	
