= Where the Drowned Girls Go =

2022 fantasy novella by Seanan McGuire

- Cover of first edition
- Author: Seanan McGuire
- Language: English
- Series: Wayward Children
- Genre: Fantasy
- Publisher: Tor.com
- Publication date: January 4, 2022
- Publication place: United States
- Awards: Hugo Award for Best Novella (2023)
- ISBN: 978-1-250-21362-4
- Preceded by: Across the Green Grass Fields
- Followed by: Lost in the Moment and Found

Where the Drowned Girls Go is a 2022 fantasy novella by American author Seanan McGuire. It is the seventh book published in the Wayward Children series and follows the character Cora.

Where the Drowned Girls Go won the 2023 Hugo Award for Best Novella.

== Plot ==
Where the Drowned Girls Go follows Cora Miller. At the beginning of the novel, readers learn more about Cora's history: after a suicide attempt following relentless bullying from peers regarding her weight, she found a door into the Trenches, "a magical undersea world where she was a mermaid and a hero, valued for her bulk and her strength". After being pushed out of the Trenches, Cora returned to school, where she faced further scrutiny, this time because of her rainbow skin and turquoise hair. Eleanor West, matron of the School for Wayward Children and a former adventurer herself, found Cora and invited her to the school, where she could live with other adventurers.

In Come Tumbling Down Cora had travelled to the Moors and been lured into the seas by the Drowned Gods. After returning to the School for Wayward Children, Cora suffers nightly from the call of the Drowned Gods, and ultimately asks the school's matron, Eleanor West, to transfer to the Whitethorn Institute, where children who have gone on magical adventures aim to forget their journeys to return to the 'real world'. After transferring schools, Cora is subjected to strict rules enforced on her as a result of living in a so-called 'nonsense world'. As Cora is adjusting to the school, and experiencing bullying from other students, her former classmate Sumi, a girl who lived in the nonsense world of Confection and is made of candy, joins the school with aims to rescue Cora.

Mystery unfolds as Sumi, Cora, and their classmates learn Whitethorn's dark secrets and plot to escape.

== Characters ==
- Cora Miller: the protagonist who lived in the Trenches before returning to Earth, after which she developed blue hair and sparkling skin. She is short, round, and athletic, and experienced a lot of bullying due to her appearance.
- Eleanor West: the proprietor of Eleanor West’s Home for Wayward Children, a boarding school for children who have journeyed to magical lands and been forcibly returned to the real world.

== Themes ==
Where the Drowned Girls Go explores the themes of "identity, body image, and trauma", while returning to the theme of heroes versus monsters, which McGuire explores throughout the Wayward Children series.

Much of the focus on body image centers on Cora's weight, as she is bullied relentlessly by other students both in her early years at the Whitethorn Institute. Through the narrative, McGuire explores myths surrounding weight loss, namely that losing weight is equally easy for everyone, regardless of genes.

The theme of heroes and monsters is explored "in many forms here, most notably unpacking the ways that the people in charge always think (or at least claim) that they are doing the right thing, even when it is clearly harmful".

== Reception ==
Where the Drowned Girls Go was well received by critics, included a starred review from Publishers Weekly, who called the novel "outstanding". They highlighted how "McGuire’s sense of whimsy never falters. She delivers a plot dense enough for a full-length novel in her signature lyrical prose, exploring the effect of cruel, oppressive systems on children’s psyches, while keeping the series’ fairy tale tone intact". Kirkus Reviews indicated that "McGuire’s themes [...] won’t surprise readers of this series and her other works, but her usual arguments remain sound, and she tells a good story".

Book Reporter's Rebecca Munro called the novel "delightful" and "empowering". Munro highlighted how the glimpse of the Whitethorn Institute provided an greater reflection of the importance of the School for Wayward Children, given that "Whitethorn's rigidity functions as a sort of conversion-therapy-themed boarding school, a dark, controlling place where kids are forced to subdue or give up the qualities that make them unique, magical and heroic".

Booklist observed that it "highlights the horror of a world that requires you to deny what you know to be true because it doesn't quite fit", and praised it as "a fantastic and tension-filled addition to the Wayward Children series".

Where the Drowned Girls Go won the 2023 Hugo Award for Best Novella.
