= In an Absent Dream =

2019 fantasy novella by Seanan McGuire

- Cover of first edition
- Author: Seanan McGuire
- Language: English
- Series: Wayward Children
- Genre: Fantasy
- Publisher: Tor.com
- Publication date: January 8, 2019
- Publication place: United States
- ISBN: 978-0-7653-9929-8
- Preceded by: Beneath the Sugar Sky
- Followed by: Come Tumbling Down

In an Absent Dream is a 2019 fantasy novella by American author Seanan McGuire. It is the fourth book in the Wayward Children series and follows Lundy, the in-house therapist at Eleanor West's School for Wayward Children.

== Plot ==
In an Absent Dream introduces Katherine Lundy, a quiet, polite young girl growing up in the 1960s. Katherine is the daughter of her school's principal, and between that and her bookishness, she hasn't many friends. On the last day of school, when she is eight years old, she fails to rejoice with the other children when the school bell rings. Instead, she remains in the classroom reading. After the teacher forces her to leave, Katherine walks home, her feet carrying her as she keeps her nose in her book--that is, until she comes upon a tree where a tree shouldn't be, which provides a door to an unusual world: the Goblin Market.

In the Goblin Market, everything is bartered based on what may be considered "fair value", recognizing that what may be fair to one person is not fair to another, as the Archivist informs Katherine. Upon arrival, the Archivist informs Katherine of the rules, including that "names have power", which prompts Katherine to then go by "Lundy".

Unlike other worlds where people from our world can only come and go once, children may leave the Goblin Market and return multiple times until they turn 18. By the time they turn 18, they will not be permitted to stay in the Market unless they have completed the citizenship ceremony, at which point they will not be able to return to the world in which they were born.

From the age of 8 until her teenage years, Lundy travels back and forth from the Goblin Market to the place of her birth, always thinking of the Market as home with its strict sense of logic and her best friend, Moon. However, as she approaches her 18th birthday, she faces a choice that results in the Lundy readers meet in the series's first book, Every Heart a Doorway.

== Characters ==
- The Archivist: Lundy's caretaker in the Goblin Market
- Katherine Lundy: the protagonist, born in 1956, who is six years old when she first enters the Goblin Market
- Mockery: one of Lundy's good friends in the Goblin Market
- Moon: Lundy's best friend in the Goblin Market
- Mr Lundy: Lundy's father, who had visited the Goblin Market as a child

== Reception ==
In a starred review, Kirkus Reviews indicated that "Lundy’s adventures will feel sadly inevitable to readers of the previous books in the series, [...] but readers will assuredly not regret going on this journey". They further highlighted how McGuire "beautifully portrays the overwhelming experience of being on the threshold of maturity, convinced (sometimes correctly, unfortunately) that the choices one makes now will affect one’s entire adult life, struggling to balance obligations to oneself and to others, and feeling paralyzed on that brink."

Booklist's Regina Schroeder called In an Absent Dream "a lovely installment of the series, with pitch-perfect fairy-tale logic". Schroeder also noted that the whole series, including this installment, "has wonderful, internally consistent world building and characters, no matter how far in the background, with complexity and depth".

AudioFile reviewed the audiobook, writing, "Cynthia Hopkins narrates this fantasy in a detached tone that fits the serious and logical perspective of Katherine Lundy".

In 2020, In an Absent Dream was a finalist for the Hugo Award for Best Novella and the World Fantasy Award for Novella.
