= Come Tumbling Down =

2020 fantasy novella by Seanan McGuire

- Cover of first edition
- Author: Seanan McGuire
- Language: English
- Series: Wayward Children
- Genre: Fantasy
- Publisher: Tor.com
- Publication date: January 7, 2020
- Publication place: United States
- ISBN: 978-0-7653-9931-1
- Preceded by: In an Absent Dream
- Followed by: Across the Green Grass Fields

Come Tumbling Down is a 2020 fantasy novella by American author Seanan McGuire. It is the fifth book in the Wayward Children series and focuses on the Wolcott twins, who were centered in the first book in the series (Every Heart a Doorway) and the second (Down Among the Sticks and Bones). This time, the children from the School for Wayward Children must venture into the Moors to save Jack Wolcott and the Moors themselves.

== Plot ==
Come Tumbling Down begins at Eleanor West's School for Wayward Children as sparks of lightning strike in the basement, bringing to life a door through which a teenaged girl steps, another girl in her arms. Soon, the children learn that the injured girl is Jack Wolcott, a former schoolmate, and the girl carrying her is her beloved Alexis from the Moors, a world filled with vampires, werewolves, mad scientists, and other monsters. The children soon learn that Jill sought out revenge after Jack had previously killed her to end Jill's murderous rampage in Every Heart a Doorway. Though Jack, who apprenticed with a mad scientist in the Moors, was able to bring Jill back to life, Jill would no longer be eligible to become a vampire as she had dreamed. However, because Jack's body had never died, her body could still become vampiric. As such, Jill concocted and carried out a plan to switch her body with Jack's. This distresses Jack not only because she doesn't want her body defiled by vampirism but also because her obsessive–compulsive disorder is in overdrive living in her sister's body.

In hopes of returning to the girls to their rightful bodies and saving the Moors, the children venture into the Moors.

== Characters ==
- Alexis Chopper: Jack's love interest in the Moors
- Christopher Flores: a student who lived in the skeleton world of Mariposa before arriving at the Home for Wayward Children.
- Cora Miller: a student who lived in the underwater world of the Trenches before arriving at the Home for Wayward Children.
- Jack Wolcott: Jill's twin sister who trained under Dr. Bleak when they lived in the Moors.
- Jill Wolcott: Jack's twin sister who was daughter to the Master when they lived in the Moors.
- Kade Bronson: a student who lived in Prism before coming to the School for Wayward Children.
- Onishi Sumi: Nancy's roommate, who lived in Confection, a land of sugar, before coming to the School for Wayward Children.

== Major themes ==
Come Tumbling Down explores various themes. Both Booklist and Library Journal discussed the novel's exploration regarding the themes of "dysphoria and gender", in large part because two of the book's characters spend much of the book living in the other's body, causing distress.

Further, Kirkus Reviews highlighted an ongoing theme in the Wayward Children series regarding how "one’s real or perceived flaws can prove to be a source of strength despite, or even because of, the pain they cause to oneself and others."

According to Publishers Weekly, the novels also explores the themes of "sacrifice, love, and hope".

== Reception ==
Come Tumbling Down received starred reviews from Kirkus Reviews and Library Journal.

Publishers Weekly referred to the novel as a "grim yet achingly tender tale".

Multiple reviewers discussed McGuire's skill as a writer. Library Journal's Kristi Chadwick generally spotlighted "McGuire’s rich prose", while Booklist's Regina Schroeder highlighted the novel's "magnificent worlds" and "wonderful variety of characters". Kirkus Reviews praised McGuire's ability to "lending equal richness to her worldbuilding and her characterizations", comparing the Moors to the worlds and fantasies concocted by Bram Stoker (Dracula), Mary Shelley (Frankenstein), and H. P. Lovecraft. They also noted that the characters feel like "real people dumped into fantastical situations" with a "thin line separating heroes from monsters".

AudioFile reviewed the audiobook, referring to the author's reading as "serviceable". They highlighted McGuire's strength narrating the "dialogue, as she allows the characters' tenderness and tenacity to come through". However, they noted that "she reads at such an accelerated pace that listeners may not be able to truly savor the lush beauty of her prose".

Locus included Come Tumbling Down on their list of the best science fiction novellas of 2020. The novel was also nominated for the 2020 Hugo Award for Best Novella and World Fantasy Award for Novella.
