= Mislaid in Parts Half-Known =

2021 fantasy novella by Seanan McGuire

- Cover of first edition
- Author: Seanan McGuire
- Language: English
- Series: Wayward Children
- Genre: Fantasy
- Publisher: Tor.com
- Publication date: January 9, 2024
- Publication place: United States
- ISBN: 978-1-250-84850-5
- Preceded by: Lost in the Moment and Found
- Followed by: Adrift in Currents Clean and Clear

Mislaid in Parts Half-Known is a 2024 fantasy novella by American author Seanan McGuire. It is the ninth book published in the Wayward Children book published in the series and Antsy and other children from the School for Wayward Children as they travel to multiple worlds.

== Plot ==
At the beginning of Mislaid in Parts Half-Known, Antsy begins schooling at Eleanor West's Home for Wayward Children, though she feels disconnected from the other students, given that she's only 9 years old but looks 16 due to the events in Lost in the Moment and Found. She learns that since leaving the Shop Where the Lost Things Go, she can easily find anything that's missing, which catches the attention of Seraphina, a spellbindingly-beautiful classmate who wants to exploit her powers to return home. In hopes of escaping, Antsy and friends rush through a door leading to the world of goblins and fairies, from which Kade had been expelled. Antsy, Kade, Sumi, Emily, and Cora rush out of the world, finding themselves in the Shop Where the Lost Things Go, only to realize that the problems that arose in Lost in the Moment and Found have gotten worse: Hudson has been locked away in another world, and the new shopkeeper, five-year-old Yulia from the Moors, has not been taught the cost of the doors. The schoolmates get through another door, where they find Stephanie, a classmate from Whitethorn Academy, who has made a family among dinosaurs. The crew work their way back home, righting wrongs along the way.

== Characters ==
- Angela: a student at the Home for Wayward Children who is friends with Seraphina.
- Antoinette "Antsy" Ricci: a student who worked the front desk at the Shop Where the Lost Things Go before coming to the Home for Wayward Children.
- Christopher Flores: a student who lived in the skeleton world of Mariposa before coming to the Home for Wayward Children.
- Cora Miller: a student who lived in the underwater world of the Trenches before coming to the Home for Wayward Children.
- Eleanor West: the proprietor of Eleanor West’s Home for Wayward Children, a boarding school for children who have journeyed to magical lands and been forcibly returned to the real world.
- Hudson: a talking magpie who cares for the Shop Where the Lost Things Go.
- Kade Bronson: a student who lived in Prism, a world of goblins and fairies, before coming to the Home for Wayward Children.
- Seraphina: a student at the Home for Wayward Children whose beauty can get her anything she wants.
- Onishi Sumi: a student who lived in the sugary world of Confection before coming to the Home for Wayward Children.
- Vineta: the old keeper of the Shop Where the Lost Things Go.
- Yulia: the new child at the Shop Where the Lost Things Go.

== Reception ==
According to Booklist's Regina Schroeder, Mislaid in Parts Half-Known is a "satisfying installment for the Wayward Children series fans". Kristi Chadwick, writing for Library Journal, found that the "delightful portal fantasy will stick in readers' hearts".

AudioFile reviewed the audiobook narrated by Jesse Vilinsky, writing, "Vilinsky creates fun, expressive banter between Antsy and the group as they journey back home [...] Some characters are depicted with quirky personalities, but the narration is strongest in the colorful way Vilinsky describes the fantastical setting."
