= Across the Green Grass Fields =

2021 fantasy novella by Seanan McGuire

- Cover of first edition
- Author: Seanan McGuire
- Language: English
- Series: Wayward Children
- Genre: Fantasy
- Publisher: Tor.com
- Publication date: January 12, 2021
- Publication place: United States
- ISBN: 978-1-250-21359-4
- Preceded by: Come Tumbling Down
- Followed by: Where the Drowned Girls Go

Across the Green Grass Fields is a 2021 fantasy novella by American author Seanan McGuire. It is the sixth book published in the Wayward Children book series and follows Regan as she learns about her true nature then travels to a world of centaurs and unicorns, where she finds family.

== Plot ==
Across the Green Grass Fields follows young Regan as she begins learning various truths about the world, including what it means to be a girl. Early in the novella, Regan is best friends with Heather and Laura; however, when Heather brings a snake to school, Laura declares that girls do not like snakes, and thus, she—and Regan—cannot be friends with Heather any longer. Regan holds this memory close as she grows up, remaining close friends with Laura and her new posse of girl friends. However, she finds herself more and more disconnected as the other girls begin to develop and mature while her body remains the same. After asking her parents what's wrong with her, Regan learns a secret about herself that she's sure her best friend would understand and respect. With the weight of this news, she tells Laura her secret. To Regan's dismay, Laura immediately declares that Regan is not a true girl.

After her fight with Laura, Regan runs away from school down a path in the woods where she stumbles upon a door that she assumes must be part of an older student's art project. When she opens the door, however, she finds herself in Hoofland, a world filled with unicorns, centaurs, and other horse-like creatures.

Regan first meets a centaur family, who care for her as though she were another member of the family for many years, growing alongside the only foal, Chicory, who quickly becomes her best friend. Regan lives with the herd, though she knows about the fate bestowed upon her: whenever a human enters Hoofland, it represents a great, heroic change. Regan defies fate for as long as she can until it catches up to her.

== Characters ==
- Regan Lewis: the protagonist
- Heather: one of Regan's best friends in school
- Laurel: one of Regan's best friends in school
- Chicory: Regan's best friend in the Hooflands

== Reception ==
Across the Green Grass Fields was well received by critics, including starred reviews from Kirkus Reviews and Publishers Weekly.

Kirkus indicated that the novella provides "probably the most literal iteration of McGuire's ongoing argument that biology is not destiny," a point Kristi Chadwick raised in her review for School Library Journal, as well, noting that "McGuire's inclusive characters are always presented fully formed and without cliché, and her critical takes on femininity in society are balanced with the beauty of the love of biological and found family."

Multiple reviewers highlighted the novella's writing. Despite an overall mixed review, Grimdark's Elizabeth Tabler praised the book's "beautiful writing" with "a great explanation of centaurs’ matriarchal society, and touching descriptions of the real friendships Regan makes". On behalf of Library Journal, Kristi Chadwick similarly pointed to the "emotional and moving" prose, which she believes "will speak to the hearts and minds of readers".

A few reviewers commented on the novella's plot. Alex Brown, writing for Reactor, stated that Across the Green Grass Fields "is the lightest of the Wayward Children series in terms of action and plot", though noted that "while McGuire doesn't devote as much intensity to the plot, the messaging and subtext are thrumming with energy". Tabler similarly noted that she "came out of the story almost ambivalent to the plot [...] Beyond the lush details, the actual plot and final crescendo of the story fell flat [... ] It felt anti-climatic in the face of such excellent writing".

Booklist's Regina Schroeder indicated that "McGuire's depiction of the [school] girls’ dynamic is painfully accurate. But McGuire can be trusted to give her stories depth that both the characters and readers—even newcomers who start the series here—can handle."

Across the Green Grass Fields was nominated for the 2022 Hugo Award for Best Novella.
