= Dusk or Dark or Dawn or Day =

2017 novella by Seanan McGuire

- Author: Seanan McGuire
- Language: English
- Genre: Ghost story; urban fantasy
- Published: 10 Jan 2017
- Publisher: Tor.com
- ISBN: 978-0-7653-9142-1

Dusk or Dark or Dawn or Day is a 2017 standalone urban fantasy ghost story by Seanan McGuire.

== Plot ==
In 1972, Jenna's older sister Patty commits suicide; a grief-stricken Jenna falls down a ravine and dies. Jenna's ghost remains on Earth.

Ghosts are created when someone dies too young; they will not pass on to the afterlife until they reach their natural “dying day”. Ghosts will not age as time passes, but they have the ability to take time from the living. This makes the ghost older and the living person younger.

In 2015, Jenna works at a suicide prevention hotline. Every time she saves a life, she allows herself to age slightly; she believes that she must earn the right to pass on.

Ghosts begin disappearing from New York. Jenna and Brenda, a local corn witch, deduce that an unknown entity is trapping the ghosts in mirrors. They trace the entity to Jenna's hometown of Mill Hollow, Kentucky. In an abandoned theater in Mill Hollow, Jenna encounters Brenda's daughter Teresa, also a corn witch. Teresa traps Jenna inside a mirror; she plans to sell the trapped ghosts as a way to extend the buyers’ lifespans. Jenna escapes and rescues the trapped ghosts. Brenda confronts her daughter, transforming them both into corn and growing a new field where the theater once stood. Jenna reaches her dying day and walks with her sister Patty into the afterlife.

== Reception ==
Publishers Weekly wrote that McGuire "displays her typical mix of endearing characters" in the novel, concluding that "this tightly paced adventure will win hearts with a charming protagonist and a well-earned ending." A review in Kirkus gave the novella 7 out of 10 stars, calling it "a really rich, poignant tale that delves into ... questions of mortality, loss, guilt, and so much more." The review also noted that the novella finds itself in a "hard place" due to its short length, with the reviewer wishing for more time to spend with Jenna's found family.

Liz Bourke of Tor.com wrote that the book occupies a liminal space between novellas and short novels, which is appropriate for "a story sliding elegantly across the edges of multiple subgenres". Bourke praised McGuire's "energetic and transparent" prose, as well as the well-developed characters. The review also noted that "the most gaping [flaws] are the two astounding coincidences on which the story’s conclusion hinges." Finally, Bourke noted that "As someone who has, at times, wrestled with suicidal ideation, I have complicated feelings about how suicide is treated in fiction, and I am particularly uneasy with suicides side-by-side with portrayals of post-death afterlives."
