= Hugo Award for Best Novella =

Annual award for science fiction or fantasy

- Awarded for: The best science fiction or fantasy story of between 17,500 and 40,000 words published in the prior calendar year
- Presented by: World Science Fiction Society
- First award: 1968
- Most recent winner: Amal El-Mohtar (The River Has Roots)
- Website: www.thehugoawards.org

The Hugo Award for Best Novella is one of the Hugo Awards given each year for science fiction or fantasy stories published or translated into English during the previous calendar year. The novella award is available for works of fiction of between 17,500 and 40,000 words; awards are also given out in the short story, novelette, and novel categories. The Hugo Awards have been described as "a fine showcase for speculative fiction" and "the best known literary award for science fiction writing".

The Hugo Award for Best Novella has been awarded annually since 1968. In addition to the regular Hugo Awards, between 1996 and 2025, Retrospective Hugo Awards or "Retro-Hugos" were available for works published 50, 75, or 100 years prior. Retro-Hugos could only be awarded for years after 1939 in which no awards were originally given. Retro-Hugos were given for novellas for 1939, 1941, 1943–1946, 1951, and 1954.

During the 67 nomination years, 196 authors have had works as finalists; 48 of these have won, including coauthors and Retro-Hugos. One translator has been noted along with the author of a novella written in a language other than English: Alex Woodend, in 2024, for translations of two works from Chinese. Connie Willis has received the most Hugos for Best Novella at four out of eight final ballot nominations. Willis and Charles Stross at three out of four nominations, and Robert A. Heinlein at three out of six nominations for Retro-Hugos, are the only authors to have won more than twice. Seanan McGuire has earned nine nominations, the most of any author; Robert Silverberg has earned eight, Nancy Kress seven, and Heinlein, George R. R. Martin, Kim Stanley Robinson, and Lucius Shepard six, the only authors besides Willis to get more than five. Robinson has the highest number of nominations without winning.

== Selection ==
Hugo Award nominees and winners are chosen by the supporting and attending members of the annual World Science Fiction Convention, or Worldcon, and the presentation evening constitutes its central event. The selection process is defined in the World Science Fiction Society Constitution as instant-runoff voting with six finalists, except in the case of a tie. These novellas on the ballot are the six most-nominated by members that year, with no limit on the number of stories that can be nominated. Initial nominations are made by members in January through March, while voting on the ballot of six finalists is performed roughly in April through July, subject to change depending on when that year's Worldcon is held. Prior to 2017, the final ballot was five works; it was changed that year to six, with each initial nominator limited to five nominations. Worldcons are generally held near the start of September, and are held in a different city around the world each year. Members are permitted to vote "no award", if they feel that none of the finalists is deserving of the award that year, and in the case that "no award" takes the majority the Hugo is not given in that category. This happened in the Best Novella category in 2015.

== Winners and finalists ==
In the following table, the years correspond to the date of the ceremony, rather than when the novella was first published. Each year links to the corresponding "year in literature". Entries with a yellow background have won the award; those with a grey background are the finalists on the short-list. If the novella was originally published in a book with other stories rather than by itself or in a magazine, the book title is included after the publisher's name.

* Winners and joint winners
+ No winner selected

Winners and finalists
Year	Author(s)	Novella	Publisher or publication	Ref.
1968	Philip José Farmer*	"Riders of the Purple Wage"	Dangerous Visions (Doubleday)	
1968	Anne McCaffrey*	"Weyr Search"	Analog Science Fact & Fiction	
1968	Roger Zelazny	"Damnation Alley"	Galaxy Science Fiction	
1968	Samuel R. Delany	"The Star Pit"	Worlds of Tomorrow	
1968	Robert Silverberg	"Hawksbill Station"	Galaxy Science Fiction	
1969	Robert Silverberg*	"Nightwings"	Galaxy Science Fiction	
1969	Anne McCaffrey	"Dragonrider"	Analog Science Fact & Fiction	
1969	Samuel R. Delany	"Lines of Power"	The Magazine of Fantasy & Science Fiction	
1969	Dean McLaughlin	"Hawk Among the Sparrows"	Analog Science Fact & Fiction	
1970	Fritz Leiber*	"Ship of Shadows"	The Magazine of Fantasy & Science Fiction	
1970	Harlan Ellison	"A Boy and His Dog"	The Beast That Shouted Love at the Heart of the World (Avon Publications)	
1970	James Blish	"We All Die Naked"	Three for Tomorrow (Meredith Press)	
1970	Anne McCaffrey	"Dramatic Mission"	Analog Science Fact & Fiction	
1970	Robert Silverberg	"To Jorslem"	Galaxy Science Fiction	
1971	Fritz Leiber*	"Ill Met in Lankhmar"	The Magazine of Fantasy & Science Fiction	
1971	Clifford D. Simak	"The Thing in the Stone"	If	
1971	Harlan Ellison	"The Region Between"	Galaxy Science Fiction	
1971	Robert Silverberg	"The World Outside"	Galaxy Science Fiction	
1971	Dean Koontz	"Beastchild"	Venture Science Fiction Magazine	
1972	Poul Anderson*	"The Queen of Air and Darkness"	The Magazine of Fantasy & Science Fiction	
1972	Arthur C. Clarke	"A Meeting with Medusa"	Playboy	
1972	Larry Niven	"The Fourth Profession"	Quark/4 (Paperback Library)	
1972	John Brunner	"Dread Empire"	Fantastic	
1972	Gardner Dozois	"A Special Kind of Morning"	New Dimensions 1 (Doubleday)	
1973	Ursula K. Le Guin*	"The Word for World Is Forest"	Again, Dangerous Visions (Doubleday)	
1973	Frederik Pohl	"The Gold at the Starbow's End"	Analog Science Fact & Fiction	
1973	Gene Wolfe	"The Fifth Head of Cerberus"	Orbit #10 (Putnam Publishing Group)	
1973	Joe Haldeman	"Hero"	Analog Science Fact & Fiction	
1973	Jerry Pournelle	"The Mercenary"	Analog Science Fact & Fiction	
1974	James Tiptree, Jr.*	"The Girl Who Was Plugged In"	New Dimensions 3 (Doubleday)	
1974	Gene Wolfe	"The Death of Doctor Island"	Universe 3 (Bantam Spectra)	
1974	Michael Bishop	"Death and Designation Among the Asadi"	If	
1974	Michael Bishop	"The White Otters of Childhood"	The Magazine of Fantasy & Science Fiction	
1974	Gardner Dozois	"Chains of the Sea"	Chains of the Sea (X-S Books)	
1975	George R. R. Martin*	"A Song for Lya"	Analog Science Fact & Fiction	
1975	Gardner Dozois	"Strangers"	New Dimensions IV (Doubleday)	
1975	Robert Silverberg	"Born with the Dead"	The Magazine of Fantasy & Science Fiction	
1975	Norman Spinrad	"Riding the Torch"	Threads of Time (Thomas Nelson)	
1975	Jack Vance	"Assault on a City"	Universe 4 (Bantam Spectra)	
1976	Roger Zelazny*	"Home Is the Hangman"	Analog Science Fact & Fiction	
1976	George R. R. Martin	"The Storms of Windhaven"	Analog Science Fact & Fiction	
1976	Lisa Tuttle	"The Storms of Windhaven"	Analog Science Fact & Fiction	
1976	Larry Niven	"ARM"	Epoch (Putnam Publishing Group)	
1976	Algis Budrys	"The Silent Eyes of Time"	The Magazine of Fantasy & Science Fiction	
1976	Richard Cowper	"The Custodians"	The Magazine of Fantasy & Science Fiction	
1977	Spider Robinson*	"By Any Other Name"	Analog Science Fact & Fiction	
1977	James Tiptree, Jr.*	"Houston, Houston, Do You Read?"	Aurora: Beyond Equality (Fawcett Publications)	
1977	Michael Bishop	"The Samurai and the Willows"	The Magazine of Fantasy & Science Fiction	
1977	Richard Cowper	"Piper at the Gates of Dawn"	The Magazine of Fantasy & Science Fiction	
1978	Spider Robinson*	"Stardance"	Analog Science Fact & Fiction	
1978	Jeanne Robinson*	"Stardance"	Analog Science Fact & Fiction	
1978	John Varley	"In the Hall of the Martian Kings"	The Magazine of Fantasy & Science Fiction	
1978	Vonda N. McIntyre	"Aztecs"	2076: The American Tricentennial (Pyramid Books)	
1978	Gregory Benford	"A Snark in the Night"	The Magazine of Fantasy & Science Fiction	
1978	Keith Laumer	"The Wonderful Secret"	Analog Science Fact & Fiction	
1979	John Varley*	"The Persistence of Vision"	The Magazine of Fantasy & Science Fiction	
1979	Joan D. Vinge	"Fireship"	Analog Science Fact & Fiction	
1979	Christopher Priest	"The Watched"	The Magazine of Fantasy & Science Fiction	
1979	Brian Aldiss	"Enemies of the System"	The Magazine of Fantasy & Science Fiction	
1979	Gene Wolfe	"Seven American Nights"	Orbit #20 (Putnam Publishing Group)	
1980	Barry B. Longyear*	"Enemy Mine"	Asimov's Science Fiction	
1980	Orson Scott Card	"Songhouse"	Analog Science Fact & Fiction	
1980	Donald Kingsbury	"The Moon Goddess and the Son"	Analog Science Fact & Fiction	
1980	Ted Reynolds	"Ker-Plop"	Asimov's Science Fiction	
1980	Hilbert Schenck	"The Battle of the Abaco Reefs"	The Magazine of Fantasy & Science Fiction	
1981	Gordon R. Dickson*	"Lost Dorsai"	Destinies #2 (Ace Books)	
1981	George R. R. Martin	"One-Wing"	Analog Science Fact & Fiction	
1981	Lisa Tuttle	"One-Wing"	Analog Science Fact & Fiction	
1981	George R. R. Martin	"Nightflyers"	Analog Science Fact & Fiction	
1981	Thomas M. Disch	"The Brave Little Toaster"	The Magazine of Fantasy & Science Fiction	
1981	Harlan Ellison	"All the Lies that Are My Life"	The Magazine of Fantasy & Science Fiction	
1982	Poul Anderson*	"The Saturn Game"	Analog Science Fact & Fiction	
1982	Phyllis Eisenstein	"In the Western Tradition"	The Magazine of Fantasy & Science Fiction	
1982	John Varley	"Blue Champagne"	New Voices #4 (Berkley Books)	
1982	Kate Wilhelm	"With Thimbles, With Forks and Hope"	Asimov's Science Fiction	
1982	Vernor Vinge	"True Names"	Binary Star #5 (Dell Publishing)	
1982	David R. Palmer	"Emergence"	Analog Science Fact & Fiction	
1983	Joanna Russ*	"Souls"	The Magazine of Fantasy & Science Fiction	
1983	David Brin	"The Postman"	Asimov's Science Fiction	
1983	George R. R. Martin	"Unsound Variations"	Amazing Stories	
1983	Joseph H. Delaney	"Brainchild"	Analog Science Fact & Fiction	
1983	Kim Stanley Robinson	"To Leave a Mark"	The Magazine of Fantasy & Science Fiction	
1983	John Kessel	"Another Orphan"	The Magazine of Fantasy & Science Fiction	
1984	Timothy Zahn*	"Cascade Point"	Analog Science Fact & Fiction	
1984	Greg Bear	"Hardfought"	Asimov's Science Fiction	
1984	Joseph H. Delaney	"In the Face of My Enemy"	Analog Science Fact & Fiction	
1984	David R. Palmer	"Seeking"	Analog Science Fact & Fiction	
1984	Hilbert Schenck	"Hurricane Claude"	The Magazine of Fantasy & Science Fiction	
1985	John Varley*	"Press Enter ■"	Asimov's Science Fiction	
1985	David Brin	"Cyclops"	Asimov's Science Fiction	
1985	Joseph H. Delaney	"Valentina"	Analog Science Fact & Fiction	
1985	Marc Stiegler	"Valentina"	Analog Science Fact & Fiction	
1985	Charles L. Harness	"Summer Solstice"	Analog Science Fact & Fiction	
1985	Geoffrey A. Landis	"Elemental"	Analog Science Fact & Fiction	
1986	Roger Zelazny*	"24 Views of Mt. Fuji, by Hokusai"	Asimov's Science Fiction	
1986	Robert Silverberg	"Sailing to Byzantium"	Asimov's Science Fiction	
1986	James Tiptree, Jr.	"The Only Neat Thing to Do"	The Magazine of Fantasy & Science Fiction	
1986	Kim Stanley Robinson	"Green Mars"	Asimov's Science Fiction	
1986	C. J. Cherryh	"The Scapegoat"	Alien Stars (Baen Books)	
1987	Robert Silverberg*	"Gilgamesh in the Outback"	Asimov's Science Fiction	
1987	Kim Stanley Robinson	"Escape from Kathmandu"	Asimov's Science Fiction	
1987	Lucius Shepard	"R&R"	Asimov's Science Fiction	
1987	Connie Willis	"Spice Pogrom"	Asimov's Science Fiction	
1987	Michael F. Flynn	"Eifelheim"	Analog Science Fact & Fiction	
1988	Orson Scott Card*	"Eye for Eye"	Asimov's Science Fiction	
1988	Robert Silverberg	"The Secret Sharer"	Asimov's Science Fiction	
1988	Kim Stanley Robinson	"The Blind Geometer"	Asimov's Science Fiction	
1988	Kim Stanley Robinson	"Mother Goddess of the World"	Asimov's Science Fiction	
1988	Michael F. Flynn	"The Forest of Time"	Analog Science Fact & Fiction	
1989	Connie Willis*	"The Last of the Winnebagos"	Asimov's Science Fiction	
1989	Lucius Shepard	"The Scalehunter's Beautiful Daughter"	Asimov's Science Fiction	
1989	Norman Spinrad	"Journals of the Plague Years"	Full Spectrum (Doubleday)	
1989	Bradley Denton	"The Calvin Coolidge Home for Dead Comedians"	Fantasy & Science Fiction	
1989	Walter Jon Williams	"Surfacing"	Asimov's Science Fiction	
1990	Lois McMaster Bujold*	"The Mountains of Mourning"	Analog Science Fact & Fiction	
1990	Lucius Shepard	"The Father of Stones"	Asimov's Science Fiction	
1990	Megan Lindholm	"A Touch of Lavender"	Asimov's Science Fiction	
1990	Connie Willis	"Time-Out"	Asimov's Science Fiction	
1990	Judith Moffett	"Tiny Tango"	Asimov's Science Fiction	
1991	Joe Haldeman*	"The Hemingway Hoax"	Asimov's Science Fiction	
1991	Mike Resnick	"Bully!"	Asimov's Science Fiction	
1991	Kim Stanley Robinson	"A Short, Sharp Shock"	Asimov's Science Fiction	
1991	Pat Murphy	"Bones"	Asimov's Science Fiction	
1991	Pat Cadigan	"Fool to Believe"	Asimov's Science Fiction	
1992	Nancy Kress*	"Beggars in Spain"	Asimov's Science Fiction	
1992	Kristine Kathryn Rusch	"The Gallery of His Dreams"	Asimov's Science Fiction	
1992	Connie Willis	"Jack"	Asimov's Science Fiction	
1992	Michael Swanwick	Griffin's Egg	St. Martin's Press	
1992	Nancy Kress	"And Wild for to Hold"	Asimov's Science Fiction	
1993	Lucius Shepard*	"Barnacle Bill the Spacer"	Asimov's Science Fiction	
1993	Frederik Pohl	Stopping at Slowyear	Bantam Spectra	
1993	Maureen F. McHugh	"Protection"	Asimov's Science Fiction	
1993	Jonathan Carroll	"Uh-Oh City"	Fantasy & Science Fiction	
1993	Bradley Denton	"The Territory"	Fantasy & Science Fiction	
1994	Harry Turtledove*	"Down in the Bottomlands"	Analog Science Fiction and Fact	
1994	Walter Jon Williams	"Wall, Stone, Craft"	Fantasy & Science Fiction	
1994	G. David Nordley	"Into the Miranda Rift"	Analog Science Fiction and Fact	
1994	Jack Cady	"The Night We Buried Road Dog"	Fantasy & Science Fiction	
1994	Pat Murphy	"An American Childhood"	Asimov's Science Fiction	
1994	Harlan Ellison	"Mefisto In Onyx"	Omni	
1995	Mike Resnick*	"Seven Views of Olduvai Gorge"	Fantasy & Science Fiction	
1995	Brian Stableford	"Les Fleurs du Mal"	Asimov's Science Fiction	
1995	Ursula K. Le Guin	"Forgiveness Day"	Asimov's Science Fiction	
1995	Michael Bishop	"Cri de Coeur"	Asimov's Science Fiction	
1995	Michael F. Flynn	"Melodies of the Heart"	Analog Science Fiction and Fact	
1996	Allen Steele*	"The Death of Captain Future"	Asimov's Science Fiction	
1996	Ursula K. Le Guin	"A Woman's Liberation"	Asimov's Science Fiction	
1996	Mike Resnick	"Bibi"	Asimov's Science Fiction	
1996	Susan Shwartz	"Bibi"	Asimov's Science Fiction	
1996	Ursula K. Le Guin	"A Man of the People"	Asimov's Science Fiction	
1996	Nancy Kress	"Fault Lines"	Asimov's Science Fiction	
1997	George R. R. Martin*	"Blood of the Dragon"	Asimov's Science Fiction	
1997	Jack McDevitt	"Time Travelers Never Die"	Asimov's Science Fiction	
1997	Gregory Benford	"Immersion"	SF Age	
1997	Jerry Oltion	"Abandon in Place"	Fantasy & Science Fiction	
1997	Mary Rosenblum	"Gas Fish"	Asimov's Science Fiction	
1997	Maureen F. McHugh	"The Cost to Be Wise"	Starlight #1 (Tor Books)	
1998	Allen Steele*	"...Where Angels Fear to Tread"	Asimov's Science Fiction	
1998	Adam-Troy Castro	"The Funeral March of the Marionettes"	Fantasy & Science Fiction	
1998	Geoffrey A. Landis	"Ecopoiesis"	SF Age	
1998	Paul Levinson	"Loose Ends"	Analog Science Fiction and Fact	
1998	Robert Reed	"Marrow"	SF Age	
1999	Greg Egan*	"Oceanic"	Asimov's Science Fiction	
1999	Catherine Asaro	"Aurora in Four Voices"	Analog Science Fiction and Fact	
1999	Ted Chiang	"Story of Your Life"	Starlight #2 (Tor Books)	
1999	Terry Bisson	"Get Me to the Church on Time"	Asimov's Science Fiction	
1999	Ian R. MacLeod	"The Summer Isles"	Asimov's Science Fiction	
2000	Connie Willis*	"The Winds of Marble Arch"	Asimov's Science Fiction	
2000	Harry Turtledove	"Forty, Counting Down"	Asimov's Science Fiction	
2000	Adam-Troy Castro	"The Astronaut from Wyoming"	Analog Science Fiction and Fact	
2000	Jerry Oltion	"The Astronaut from Wyoming"	Analog Science Fiction and Fact	
2000	Mike Resnick	"Hunting the Snark"	Asimov's Science Fiction	
2000	Kage Baker	"Son Observe the Time"	Asimov's Science Fiction	
2001	Jack Williamson*	"The Ultimate Earth"	Analog Science Fiction and Fact	
2001	Catherine Asaro	"A Roll of the Dice"	Analog Science Fiction and Fact	
2001	Kristine Kathryn Rusch	"The Retrieval Artist"	Analog Science Fiction and Fact	
2001	Greg Egan	"Oracle"	Asimov's Science Fiction	
2001	Ted Chiang	"Seventy-Two Letters"	Vanishing Acts (Tor Books)	
2001	Lucius Shepard	"Radiant Green Star"	Asimov's Science Fiction	
2002	Vernor Vinge*	"Fast Times at Fairmont High"	The Collected Stories of Vernor Vinge (Tor Books)	
2002	Allen Steele	"Stealing Alabama"	Asimov's Science Fiction	
2002	Brenda Clough	"May Be Some Time"	Analog Science Fiction and Fact	
2002	Andy Duncan	"The Chief Designer"	Asimov's Science Fiction	
2002	Jack Dann	"The Diamond Pit"	Jubilee (Tor Books)	
2003	Neil Gaiman*	Coraline	HarperCollins	
2003	Richard Chwedyk	"Brontë's Egg"	Fantasy & Science Fiction	
2003	Ian R. MacLeod	"Breathmoss"	Asimov's Science Fiction	
2003	Paul Di Filippo	A Year in the Linear City	PS Publishing	
2003	Charles Coleman Finlay	"The Political Officer"	Fantasy & Science Fiction	
2003	Pat Forde	"In Spirit"	Analog Science Fiction and Fact	
2004	Vernor Vinge*	"The Cookie Monster"	Analog Science Fiction and Fact	
2004	Kage Baker	"The Empress of Mars"	Asimov's Science Fiction	
2004	Connie Willis	"Just Like the Ones We Used to Know"	Asimov's Science Fiction	
2004	Walter Jon Williams	"The Green Leopard Plague"	Asimov's Science Fiction	
2004	Catherine Asaro	"Walk in Silence"	Analog Science Fiction and Fact	
2005	Charles Stross*	"The Concrete Jungle"	The Atrocity Archives (Golden Gryphon Press)	
2005	Bradley Denton	"Sergeant Chip"	Fantasy & Science Fiction	
2005	Charles Stross	"Elector"	Asimov's Science Fiction	
2005	Lois McMaster Bujold	"Winterfair Gifts"	Irresistible Forces (New American Library)	
2005	Michael A. Burstein	"Time Ablaze"	Analog Science Fiction and Fact	
2006	Connie Willis*	"Inside Job"	Asimov's Science Fiction	
2006	James Patrick Kelly	Burn	Tachyon Publications	
2006	Kelly Link	"Magic for Beginners"	Magic for Beginners (Small Beer Press)	
2006	Ian McDonald	"The Little Goddess"	Asimov's Science Fiction	
2006	Robert J. Sawyer	"Identity Theft"	Down These Dark Spaceways (Science Fiction Book Club)	
2007	Robert Reed*	"A Billion Eves"	Asimov's Science Fiction	
2007	Michael Swanwick	"Lord Weary's Empire"	Asimov's Science Fiction	
2007	Robert Charles Wilson	Julian: A Christmas Story	PS Publishing	
2007	Paul Melko	"The Walls of the Universe"	Asimov's Science Fiction	
2007	William Shunn	"Inclination"	Asimov's Science Fiction	
2008	Connie Willis*	"All Seated on the Ground"	Asimov's Science Fiction	
2008	Kristine Kathryn Rusch	"Recovering Apollo 8"	Asimov's Science Fiction	
2008	Nancy Kress	"Fountain of Age"	Asimov's Science Fiction	
2008	Lucius Shepard	"Stars Seen Through Stone"	Fantasy & Science Fiction	
2008	Gene Wolfe	"Memorare"	Fantasy & Science Fiction	
2009	Nancy Kress*	"The Erdmann Nexus"	Asimov's Science Fiction	
2009	Robert Reed	"Truth"	Asimov's Science Fiction	
2009	Ian McDonald	"The Tear"	Galactic Empires (Science Fiction Book Club)	
2009	Benjamin Rosenbaum	"True Names"	Fast Forward 2 (Pyr)	
2009	Cory Doctorow	"True Names"	Fast Forward 2 (Pyr)	
2009	Charles Coleman Finlay	"The Political Prisoner"	Fantasy & Science Fiction	
2010	Charles Stross*	"Palimpsest"	Wireless (Ace Books)	
2010	Nancy Kress	"Act One"	Asimov's Science Fiction	
2010	John Scalzi	The God Engines	Subterranean Press	
2010	James Morrow	Shambling Towards Hiroshima	Tachyon Publications	
2010	Ian McDonald	"Vishnu at the Cat Circus"	Cyberabad Days (Pyr)	
2010	Kage Baker	The Women of Nell Gwynne's	Subterranean Press	
2011	Ted Chiang*	The Lifecycle of Software Objects	Subterranean Press	
2011	Rachel Swirsky	"The Lady Who Plucked Red Flowers Beneath the Queen's Window"	Subterranean Magazine	
2011	Elizabeth Hand	"The Maiden Flight of McCauley's Bellerophon"	Stories: New Tales (Morrow)	
2011	Geoffrey A. Landis	"The Sultan of the Clouds"	Asimov's Science Fiction	
2011	Alastair Reynolds	"Troika"	Godlike Machines (Science Fiction Book Club)	
2012	Kij Johnson*	"The Man Who Bridged the Mist"	Asimov's Science Fiction	
2012	Mira Grant	Countdown	Orbit Books	
2012	Carolyn Ives Gilman	"The Ice Owl"	Fantasy & Science Fiction	
2012	Mary Robinette Kowal	"Kiss Me Twice"	Asimov's Science Fiction	
2012	Ken Liu	"The Man Who Ended History: A Documentary"	Panverse 3 (Panverse Publishing)	
2012	Catherynne M. Valente	Silently and Very Fast	WSFA Press	
2013	Brandon Sanderson*	The Emperor's Soul	Tachyon Publications	
2013	Nancy Kress	After the Fall, Before the Fall, During the Fall	Tachyon Publications	
2013	Aliette de Bodard	On a Red Station, Drifting	Immersion Press	
2013	Mira Grant	San Diego 2014: The Last Stand of the California Browncoats	Orbit Books	
2013	Jay Lake	"The Stars Do Not Lie"	Asimov's Science Fiction	
2014	Charles Stross*	"Equoid"	Tor.com	
2014	Dan Wells	The Butcher of Khardov	Privateer Press	
2014	Brad R. Torgersen	"The Chaplain's Legacy"	Analog Science Fiction and Fact	
2014	Catherynne M. Valente	Six-Gun Snow White	Subterranean Press	
2014	Andy Duncan	"Wakulla Springs"	Tor.com	
2014	Ellen Klages	"Wakulla Springs"	Tor.com	
2015	(no award)+			(Note: Several categories, including Best Novella, were awarded to "No award" in 2015 in response to the Sad Puppies and Rabid Puppies ballot manipulation campaigns.)
2015	Arlan Andrews, Sr.	"Flow"	Analog Science Fiction and Fact	
2015	Tom Kratman	Big Boys Don't Cry	Castalia House	
2015	John C. Wright	One Bright Star to Guide Them	Castalia House	
2015	John C. Wright	"Pale Realms of Shade"	The Book of Feasts & Seasons (Castalia House)	
2015	John C. Wright	"The Plural of Helen of Troy"	City Beyond Time: Tales of the Fall of Metachronopolis (Castalia House)	
2016	Nnedi Okorafor*	Binti	Tor.com	
2016	Daniel Polansky	The Builders	Tor.com	
2016	Lois McMaster Bujold	Penric's Demon	Spectrum Literary Agency	
2016	Brandon Sanderson	Perfect State	Dragonsteel Entertainment	
2016	Alastair Reynolds	Slow Bullets	Tachyon Publications	
2017	Seanan McGuire*	Every Heart a Doorway	Tor.com Publishing	
2017	Victor LaValle	The Ballad of Black Tom	Tor.com Publishing	
2017	Kij Johnson	The Dream-Quest of Vellitt Boe	Tor.com Publishing	
2017	Lois McMaster Bujold	Penric and the Shaman	Spectrum Literary Agency	
2017	Kai Ashante Wilson	A Taste of Honey	Tor.com Publishing	
2017	China Miéville	This Census-Taker	Del Rey Books / Picador	
2018	Martha Wells*	All Systems Red	Tor.com Publishing	
2018	Sarah Pinsker	"And Then There Were (N-One)"	Uncanny Magazine	
2018	Nnedi Okorafor	Binti: Home	Tor.com Publishing	
2018	JY Yang	The Black Tides of Heaven	Tor.com Publishing	
2018	Seanan McGuire	Down Among the Sticks and Bones	Tor.com Publishing	
2018	Sarah Gailey	River of Teeth	Tor.com Publishing	
2019	Martha Wells*	Artificial Condition	Tor.com Publishing	
2019	Seanan McGuire	Beneath the Sugar Sky	Tor.com Publishing	
2019	Nnedi Okorafor	Binti: The Night Masquerade	Tor.com Publishing	
2019	P. Djèlí Clark	The Black God's Drums	Tor.com Publishing	
2019	Kelly Robson	Gods, Monsters, and the Lucky Peach	Tor.com Publishing	
2019	Aliette de Bodard	The Tea Master and the Detective	Subterranean Press / JABberwocky Literary Agency	
2020	Amal El-Mohtar*	This Is How You Lose the Time War	Saga Press	
2020	Max Gladstone*	This Is How You Lose the Time War	Saga Press	
2020	Ted Chiang	"Anxiety Is the Dizziness of Freedom"	Exhalation: Stories	
2020	Rivers Solomon	The Deep	Saga Press	
2020	Daveed Diggs	The Deep	Saga Press	
2020	William Hutson	The Deep	Saga Press	
2020	Jonathan Snipes	The Deep	Saga Press	
2020	P. Djèlí Clark	The Haunting of Tram Car 015	Tor.com Publishing	
2020	Seanan McGuire	In an Absent Dream	Tor.com Publishing	
2020	Becky Chambers	To Be Taught, if Fortunate	Harper Voyager	
2021	Nghi Vo*	The Empress of Salt and Fortune	Tor.com Publishing	
2021	Nino Cipri	Finna	Tor.com Publishing	
2021	P. Djèlí Clark	Ring Shout	Tor.com Publishing	
2021	Seanan McGuire	Come Tumbling Down	Tor.com Publishing	
2021	Tochi Onyebuchi	Riot Baby	Tor.com Publishing	
2021	Sarah Gailey	Upright Women Wanted	Tor.com Publishing	
2022	Becky Chambers*	A Psalm for the Wild-Built	Tordotcom	
2022	Seanan McGuire	Across the Green Grass Fields	Tordotcom	
2022	Adrian Tchaikovsky	Elder Race	Tordotcom	
2022	Aliette de Bodard	Fireheart Tiger	Tordotcom	
2022	Catherynne M. Valente	The Past Is Red	Tordotcom	
2022	Alix E. Harrow	A Spindle Splintered	Tordotcom	
2023	Seanan McGuire*	Where the Drowned Girls Go	Tordotcom	
2023	C. L. Polk	Even Though I Knew the End	Tordotcom	
2023	Nghi Vo	Into the Riverlands	Tordotcom	
2023	Alix E. Harrow	A Mirror Mended	Tordotcom	
2023	Adrian Tchaikovsky	Ogres	Solaris Books	
2023	Ursula Vernon (as T. Kingfisher)	What Moves the Dead	Tor Nightfire	
2024	Ursula Vernon (as T. Kingfisher)*	Thornhedge	Tor Books/Titan Books	
2024	He Xi (Chinese)	"Life Does Not Allow Us to Meet"	Adventures in Space: New Short stories by Chinese & English Science Fiction Writers (Flame Tree Press)	
2024	Alex Woodend (translator)	"Life Does Not Allow Us to Meet"	Adventures in Space: New Short stories by Chinese & English Science Fiction Writers (Flame Tree Press)	
2024	Nghi Vo	Mammoths at the Gates	Tordotcom	
2024	Malka Older	The Mimicking of Known Successes	Tordotcom	
2024	Arkady Martine	Rose/House	Subterranean Press	
2024	Wang Jinkang (Chinese)	"Seeds of Mercury"	Adventures in Space: New Short stories by Chinese & English Science Fiction Writers (Flame Tree Press)	
2024	Alex Woodend (translator)	"Seeds of Mercury"	Adventures in Space: New Short stories by Chinese & English Science Fiction Writers (Flame Tree Press)	
2025	Ray Nayler*	The Tusks of Extinction	Tordotcom	
2025	Nghi Vo	The Brides of High Hill	Tordotcom	
2025	Premee Mohamed	The Butcher of the Forest	Tordotcom	
2025	Aliette de Bodard	Navigational Entanglements	Tordotcom	
2025	Sofia Samatar	The Practice, the Horizon, and the Chain	Tordotcom	
2025	Ursula Vernon (as T. Kingfisher)	What Feasts at Night	Nightfire	
2026	Amal El-Mohtar*	The River Has Roots	Tordotcom	
2026	Annalee Newitz	Automatic Noodle	Tordotcom	
2026	Freya Marske	Cinder House	Tordotcom/Tor Books	
2026	Olivia Waite	Murder by Memory	Tordotcom	
2026	Naomi Novik	The Summer War	Del Rey Books	
2026	Ursula Vernon (as T. Kingfisher)	What Stalks the Deep	Nightfire/Titan Books	

=== Retro-Hugos ===
Between the 1996 Worldcon and 2025 Worldcon, the World Science Fiction Society had the concept of "Retro-Hugos", in which the Hugo award could be retroactively awarded for 50, 75, or 100 years prior. Retro-Hugos could only be awarded for years after 1939 (the year of the first Worldcon) in which no Hugos were originally awarded. Retro-Hugos were awarded eight times, for 1939, 1941, 1943–1946, 1951, and 1954.

Retro Hugo winners and nominees
Year	Year awarded	Author(s)	Novella	Publisher or publication	Ref.
1939	2014	John W. Campbell (as Don A. Stuart)*	"Who Goes There?"	Astounding Science-Fiction	
1939	2014	Ayn Rand	Anthem	Cassell	
1939	2014	H. L. Gold	"A Matter of Form"	Astounding Science-Fiction	
1939	2014	John Wyndham	"Sleepers of Mars"	Tales of Wonder	
1939	2014	Henry Kuttner	"The Time Trap"	Marvel Science Stories	
1941	2016	Robert A. Heinlein*	"If This Goes On…"	Astounding Science Fiction	
1941	2016	Robert A. Heinlein	"Coventry"	Astounding Science Fiction	
1941	2016	Robert A. Heinlein	"Magic, Inc."	Unknown	
1941	2016	L. Sprague de Camp	"The Mathematics of Magic"	Unknown	
1941	2016	Fletcher Pratt	"The Mathematics of Magic"	Unknown	
1941	2016	L. Sprague de Camp	"The Roaring Trumpet"	Unknown	
1941	2016	Fletcher Pratt	"The Roaring Trumpet"	Unknown	
1943	2018	Robert A. Heinlein (as Anson MacDonald)*	"Waldo"	Astounding Science Fiction	
1943	2018	A. E. van Vogt	"Asylum"	Astounding Science Fiction	
1943	2018	Anthony Boucher	"The Compleat Werewolf"	Unknown	
1943	2018	Alfred Bester	"Hell is Forever"	Unknown	
1943	2018	Lester del Rey	"Nerves"	Astounding Science Fiction	
1943	2018	Robert A. Heinlein (as John Riverside)	"The Unpleasant Profession of Jonathan Hoag"	Unknown	
1944	2019	Antoine de Saint-Exupéry*	"The Little Prince"	Reynal & Hitchcock	
1944	2019	Hal Clement	"Attitude"	Astounding Science-Fiction	
1944	2019	Henry Kuttner (as Lawrence O'Donnell)	"Clash by Night"	Astounding Science-Fiction	
1944	2019	C. L. Moore (as Lawrence O'Donnell)	"Clash by Night"	Astounding Science-Fiction	
1944	2019	H. P. Lovecraft	"The Dream-Quest of Unknown Kadath"	Beyond the Wall of Sleep (Arkham House)	
1944	2019	Mary Norton	The Magic Bed-Knob; or, How to Become a Witch in Ten Easy Lessons	Hyperion Press	
1944	2019	Anthony Boucher	"We Print the Truth"	Astounding Science-Fiction	
1945	2020	Theodore Sturgeon*	"Killdozer!"	Astounding Science-Fiction	
1945	2020	A. E. van Vogt	"The Changeling"	Astounding Science-Fiction	
1945	2020	Henry Kuttner	"A God Named Kroo"	Thrilling Wonder Stories	
1945	2020	Ross Rocklynne	"Intruders from the Stars"	Amazing Stories	
1945	2020	Leigh Brackett	"The Jewel of Bas"	Planet Stories	
1945	2020	Murray Leinster	"Trog"	Astounding Science-Fiction	
1946	1996	George Orwell*	Animal Farm	Secker and Warburg	
1946	1996	Isaac Asimov	"Dead Hand"	Astounding Science-Fiction	
1946	1996	A. Bertram Chandler	"Giant Killer"	Astounding Science-Fiction	
1946	1996	Richard S. Shaver	"I Remember Lemuria"	Amazing Stories	
1951	2001	Robert A. Heinlein*	The Man Who Sold the Moon	Shasta Publishers	
1951	2001	Theodore Sturgeon	"The Dreaming Jewels"	Fantastic Adventures	
1951	2001	Isaac Asimov	"...And Now You Don't"	Astounding Science-Fiction	
1951	2001	H. Beam Piper	"Last Enemy"	Astounding Science-Fiction	
1951	2001	L. Ron Hubbard	"To the Stars"	Astounding Science-Fiction	
1954	2004	James Blish*	"A Case of Conscience"	If	
1954	2004	Poul Anderson	"Three Hearts and Three Lions"	The Magazine of Fantasy & Science Fiction	
1954	2004	Theodore Sturgeon	"...And My Fear is Great..."	Beyond Fantasy Fiction	
1954	2004	Poul Anderson	"Un-Man"	Astounding Science-Fiction	
1954	2004	Charles L. Harness	"The Rose"	Authentic Science Fiction	

== See also ==
- Nebula Award for Best Novella
