= Lost in the Moment and Found =

2023 fantasy novella by Seanan McGuire

- Cover of first edition
- Author: Seanan McGuire
- Language: English
- Series: Wayward Children
- Genre: Fantasy
- Publisher: Tor.com
- Publication date: January 10, 2023
- Publication place: United States
- ISBN: 978-1-250-21363-1
- Preceded by: Where the Drowned Girls Go
- Followed by: Mislaid in Parts Half-Known

Lost in the Moment and Found is a 2023 fantasy novella by American author Seanan McGuire. It is the eighth book published in the Wayward Children book series and follows Antoinette (Antsy) as she escapes her step-father's abuse and finds the Shop Where the Lost Things Go.

== Plot ==
Lost in the Moment and Found follows Antoinette (Antsy) Ricci. At the beginning of the book, Antsy suddenly loses her father, and her mother soon remarries a man who mistreats Antsy and turns her mother against her. Before long, her stepfather 's actions go too far, and Antsy run away. She finds a door and enters it to find herself in an unknown world that turns out to be the Shop Where the Lost Things Go, which, like its name implies, is where lost things appear to be found.

While in the shop, Antsy works with an old woman named Vineta and a talking magpie named Hudson. Every day, she travels through magical doors to new worlds, trading goods. Given that Antsy isn't living with other children from Earth, she doesn't notice the changes rapidly taking place in her body: she ages three days every time she goes through a door, though she was never informed. When she finally realizes, she's lost years and confronts Vineta and Hudson for their lies.

== Characters ==
- Antoinette "Antsy" Ricci: the protagonist
- Vineta: the very old keeper of the Shop Where the Lost Things Go
- Hudson: a talking magpie who cares for the Shop Where the Lost Things Go

== Major themes ==
Lost in the Moment and Found covers topics related to "the loss of childhood innocence", including grooming and child abuse. However, the book depicts morals of "finding strength and belonging".

== Reception ==
According to School Library Journal's Kristi Chadwick, "McGuire's powerful writing shines here as do the courageous protagonist and intricate setting descriptions". Booklist found Antsy to be "a pleasing addition to the lore of Wayward Children"

Multiple reviewers discussed McGuire's handling of the abuse depicted in the book. Chadwick applauded McGuire for including a trigger warning at the beginning of the book, which also includes a "promise of escape". According to Publishers Weekly, "McGuire manages to make some extreme tonal shifts work together beautifully." Alex Brown, writing for Reactor, wrote, "I think it’s easy to look at a book like this and feel like the whimsy from the junk shop portions overwhelms the seriousness of the real world portion, but I think that’s missing the forest for the trees. The grooming and gaslighting don’t stop when Antsy crosses the threshold, they just take on different shapes and have different end goals."

AudioFile reviewed the audiobook, describing narrator Jesse Vilinsky's performance as "versatile", highlighting how she "keeps pace as Antsy grows older, expertly adjusting her narration to the girl's maturation yet maintaining Antsy's essence."
