= Seanan McGuire =

American author and filker (born 1978)

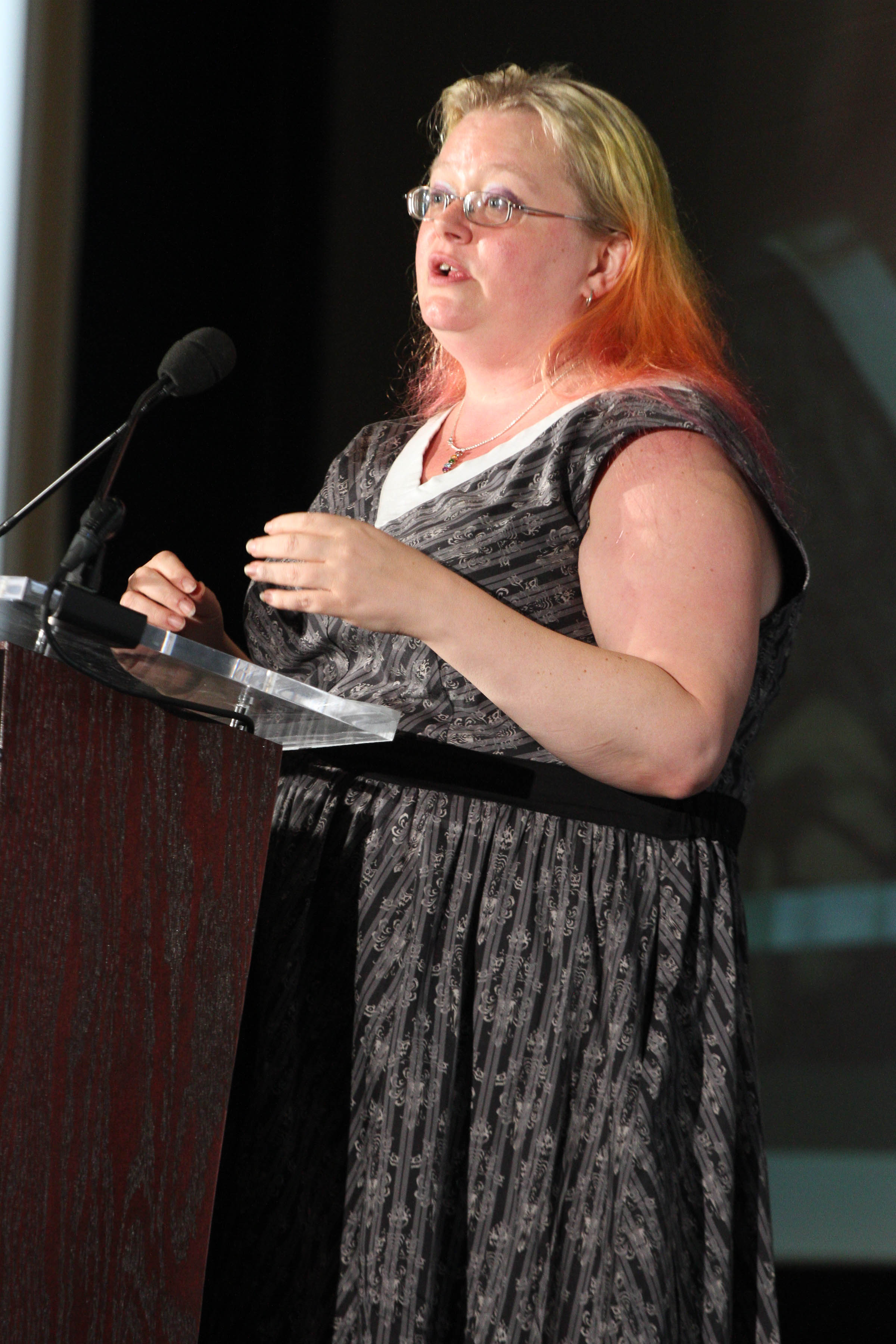
- McGuire in 2018
- Born: January 5, 1978 (age 48); Martinez, California, U.S.
- Education: University of California, Berkeley
- Occupation: Writer
- Writing career
- Pen name: Mira Grant; A. Deborah Baker
- Genres: Urban fantasy; Horror; Apocalyptic
- Notable works: Spider-Gwen: Ghost-Spider; Spider-Gwen: Into the Unknown; October Daye series; InCryptid series; Wayward Children series; Feed series (as Mira Grant); Aliens: Echo (as Mira Grant)
- Notable awards: John W. Campbell Award for Best New Writer (2010); Nebula Award for Best Novella (2016); Hugo Award for Best Novella (2017); Locus Award for Best Novella (2017); Locus Award for Best Fantasy Novel (2020)
- Website: seananmcguire.com

Seanan McGuire (/ˈʃɔːnɪn/ SHAWN-in; born January 5, 1978) is an American author and filker. McGuire is known for her urban fantasy novels and Spider-Gwen comic books. She uses the pseudonym Mira Grant to write science fiction/horror such as Aliens: Echo, and the pseudonym A. Deborah Baker to write the "Up-and-Under" children's portal fantasy series.

In 2010, she was awarded the John W. Campbell Award for Best New Writer. Her works have garnered numerous awards, including the Alex Award, Hugo Award, Locus Award, and Nebula Award.

== Early life and education ==
McGuire was born on January 5, 1978, in Martinez, California. McGuire has stated that her mother, Micki McGuire, had "primary custody, two other children, no money, and an abusive husband who targeted [Seanan]". During the summer, McGuire traveled with her father, a carnival worker of Romani origin, an experience she described as "Bradbury-esque running wild and unfettered through farmers' fields, building Ferris wheels and living on funnel cake."

McGuire was writing short stories by the time she was seven, primarily on a large electric typewriter. "I used to wrangle my cousins into these huge, elaborate sort of proto-LARPs, and I filled notebooks with the details about the worlds they were playing in..." At age nine, McGuire was diagnosed with obsessive–compulsive disorder.

McGuire doubled-majored in folklore/mythology and herpetology at the University of California, Berkeley. She also audited several courses at the California Academy of Sciences when researching viruses for her fictional zombie virus.

== Career ==
Before becoming a full-time writer, McGuire worked at a reptile rescue organization.

McGuire has published filk music, poetry, short fiction, essays, and novels. Most of her works are speculative fiction, including fantasy, science fiction, and horror. Her earliest publication was a contribution to the June 2002 poetry anthology Speculon. She produced the musical album Pretty Little Dead Girl in 2006 and published her first short story in The Edge of Propinquity in 2008. In 2009, she published her first novel, Rosemary and Rue, which has resulted in her longest-running series, with the 19th book, Silver and Lead, published in 2025.

In 2010, she published Feed under the pseudonym Mira Grant. This established Seanan McGuire as an urban fantasy writer and her pseudonym Mira Grant as a horror/science fiction writer.

In 2018, McGuire began writing for Marvel Comics. She wrote two Spider-Gwen series from 2018 to 2020 — Spider-Gwen: Ghost-Spider and Spider-Gwen: Into the Unknown — and has contributed to several other franchises.

She is a member of the Science Fiction and Fantasy Writers Association (SFWA), the Horror Writers Association (HWA), and the Book View Cafe publishing cooperative.

== Personal life ==
McGuire was diagnosed as autistic in 2020 and has attention deficit hyperactivity disorder. She identifies as pansexual, bisexual, and demisexual.

McGuire lives in Washington state.

== Notable works ==
=== Series ===
- October Daye
- InCryptid
- Wayward Children
- Alchemical Journeys
- Indexing
- Ghost Roads
- Newsflesh (as Mira Grant)
- Parasitology (as Mira Grant)
- Up-and-Under (as A. Deborah Baker)

=== Tie-ins ===
- "The Wine in Dreams" (novella included in Star Wars: Canto Bight anthology (as Mira Grant)
- Deadlands: Boneyard
- Overwatch: Declassified – An Official History (2023)

=== Comics ===
- Spider-Gwen: Ghost-Spider (ongoing series, published 2018–9)
- X-Men Black: Mystique (2018)
- Age of X-Man: The Amazing Nightcrawler (tie-in, 2019)
- Ghost-Spider/Spider-Gwen: Into the Unknown (ongoing series, 2019–20)
- King in Black: Gwenom vs. Carnage (tie-in, 2021)
- Magic: Soul and Stone (July 2023)

=== Short fiction ===
McGuire's short fiction has been published in Apex Magazine, Nightmare Magazine, Lightspeed Magazine, and others. Her works appear in anthologies edited by Charlaine Harris, Jim Butcher, and John Joseph Adams.

She has self-published hundreds of short stories. From 2008 to 2017, she posted installments of the Velveteen series to LiveJournal with the support of fan sponsorships. Tie-ins to her October Daye and InCryptid series are available for free on her website. In 2016, she launched a Patreon account to post monthly short stories for her subscribers.

== Awards and nominations ==
=== Literary awards ===
McGuire holds the record for most Hugo Award nominations in a single year, with five nominations in 2013. McGuire was the first author to win the American Library Association's Alex Awards for two consecutive years. She has been nominated for the Hugo Award for Best Series every year since its inception in 2017.

In 2010, Feed was recognized as #74 out of the 100 top thriller novels of all time by NPR. It was also recognized as a Publishers Weekly Best Books of 2010.

In 2012, McGuire (as Mira Grant) was inducted in to the Darrell Awards Hall of Fame for the best American Mid-South regional speculative fiction.

Awards for literature
Year	Work	Award	Category	Result	Ref.
2010	—	John W. Campbell Award for Best New Writer (Note: Now called the Astounding Award for Best New Writer)	—	Won	
2010	Feed	Romantic Times Reviewers’ Choice Award	Science Fiction Novel	Finalist	
2010	Feed	Shirley Jackson Award	Novel	Nominated	
2011	Deadline	Philip K. Dick Award	—	Nominated	
2011	Feed	Audie Award	Audie Award for Science Fiction	Finalist	
2011	Feed	Hugo Award	Best Novel	Finalist	
2012	"Countdown"	Hugo Award	Best Novella	Finalist	
2012	Blackout	Romantic Times Reviewers’ Choice Award	Science Fiction Novel	Finalist	
2012	Deadline	Hugo Award	Best Novel	Finalist	
2013	Blackout	Hugo Award	Best Novel	Finalist	
2013	"In Sea-Salt Tears"	Hugo Award	Best Novelette	Finalist	
2013	"Rat-Catcher"	Hugo Award	Best Novelette	Finalist	
2013	San Diego 2014: The Last Stand of the California Browncoats	Hugo Award	Best Novella	Finalist	
2014	Parasite	Hugo Award	Best Novel	Finalist	
2015	"Each to Each"	James Tiptree Jr. Award (Note: Now known as the Otherwise Award)	—	Honor List	
2016	Every Heart a Doorway	Nebula Award	Best Novella	Won	
2016	Every Heart a Doorway	James Tiptree Jr. Award	—	Honor List	
2017	Dusk or Dark or Dawn or Day	Romantic Times Reviewers’ Choice Award	Fantasy Novel	Finalist	
2017	Every Heart a Doorway	Alex Awards	—	Won	
2017	Every Heart a Doorway	British Fantasy Award	Best Novella	Finalist	
2017	Every Heart a Doorway	Hugo Award	Best Novella	Won	
2017	Every Heart a Doorway	Locus Award	Best Novella	Won	
2017	Every Heart a Doorway	World Fantasy Award	Novella	Finalist	
2017	October Daye	Hugo Award	Best Series	Finalist	
2018	Down Among the Sticks and Bones	Alex Awards	—	Won	
2018	Down Among the Sticks and Bones	Hugo Award	Best Novella	Finalist	
2018	Down Among the Sticks and Bones	Locus Award	Best Novella	Finalist	
2018	Down Among the Sticks and Bones	RUSA Award	Fantasy	Won	
2018	Every Heart a Doorway	Geffen Award	Best Translated Fantasy Book	Finalist	
2018	InCryptid	Hugo Award	Best Series	Finalist	
2018	"The Mathematical Inevitability of Corvids"	Locus Award	Best Novelette	Finalist	
2019	"Any Way the Wind Blows"	Sidewise Award for Alternate History	Short Form	Finalist	
2019	Beneath the Sugar Sky	Hugo Award	Best Novella	Finalist	
2019	Beneath the Sugar Sky	World Fantasy Award	Novella	Finalist	
2019	The Girl in the Green Silk Gown	Endeavour Award	—	Finalist	
2019	October Daye	Hugo Award	Best Series	Finalist	
2020	In an Absent Dream	Hugo Award	Best Novella	Finalist	
2020	In an Absent Dream	World Fantasy Award	Novella	Finalist	
2020	InCryptid	Hugo Award	Best Series	Finalist	
2020	Middlegame	Alex Awards	—	Won	
2020	Middlegame	Endeavour Award	—	Finalist	
2020	Middlegame	Hugo Award	Best Novel	Finalist	
2020	Middlegame	Locus Award	Best Fantasy Novel	Won	
2020	"Phantoms of the Midway"	Locus Award	Best Novelette	Finalist	
2021	Calculated Risks	Endeavour Award	—	Finalist	
2021	Come Tumbling Down	Hugo Award	Best Novella	Finalist	
2021	Come Tumbling Down	Locus Award	Best Novella	Finalist	
2021	Ghost-Spider Vol. 1: Dog Days Are Over	Hugo Award	Best Graphic Story	Finalist	
2021	October Daye	Hugo Award	Best Series	Finalist	
2021	Over the Woodward Wall	Locus Award	Best Young Adult Book	Finalist	
2022	Across the Green Grass Fields	Hugo Award	Best Novella	Finalist	
2022	Be the Serpent	Endeavour Award	—	Finalist	
2022	"Tangles"	Hugo Award	Best Short Story	Finalist	
2022	Wayward Children	Hugo Award	Best Series	Won	
2023	"In Mercy, Rain"	Locus Award	Best Novelette	Finalist	
2023	October Daye	Hugo Award	Best Series	Finalist	
2023	Sleep No More	Endeavour Award	—	Finalist	
2023	Where the Drowned Girls Go	Hugo Award	Best Novella	Won	
2024	Lost in the Moment and Found	Locus Award	Best Novella	Finalist	
2024	October Daye	Hugo Award	Best Series	Finalist	
2025	InCryptid	Hugo Award	Best Series	Finalist	
2025	Mislaid in Parts Half-Known	Locus Award	Best Novella	Finalist	
2026	October Daye	Hugo Award	Best Series	Finalist	

Other awards
Year	Work	Award	Category	Result	Ref.
2012	SF Squeecast (with Elizabeth Bear, Paul Cornell, Lynne M. Thomas, and Catherynne M. Valente)	Hugo Award	Fancast	Won	
2012	Wicked Girls	Hugo Award	Hugo Award for Best Related Work	Finalist	
2013	SF Squeecast (with Elizabeth Bear, Paul Cornell, Lynne M. Thomas, and Catherynne M. Valente)	Hugo Award	Fancast	Won	

=== Filk awards ===
Pegasus Award presented by the Ohio Valley Filk Festival.

Year	Award	Work	Result
2005	Best Writer/ Composer	N/A	Nominated
2006	Best Writer/ Composer	N/A	Nominated
2006	Best Torch Song	"Maybe It's Crazy"	Nominated
2007	Best Performer	N/A	Won
2008	Best Writer/ Composer	N/A	Won
2008	Best Tragedy Song	"The Black Death"	Nominated
2010	Best Mad Science Song	"What a Woman's For"	Won
2011	Best Filk Song	"Wicked Girls"	Won
2011	Most Badass Song	"Evil Laugh"	Won
2012	Best Filk Song	"My Story Is Not Done"	Nominated
2015	Best Filk Song	"My Story Is Not Done"	Won
2018	Best Horror Song	"Dear Gina"	Won
2021	Best Mad Science Song	"Maybe it's Crazy"	Nominated
2021	Best Cheery-Ose Song	"Dear Seanan" (with Erin Bellavia and Merav Hoffman)	Nominated
