= Down Among the Sticks and Bones =

2017 fantasy novella by Seanan McGuire

- Cover of first edition
- Author: Seanan McGuire
- Language: English
- Series: Wayward Children
- Genre: Fantasy
- Publisher: Tor.com
- Publication date: June 13, 2017
- Publication place: United States
- Awards: Alex Award (2018); RUSA Award (2018)
- ISBN: 9780765392046 (book); 978-0-7653-8387-7 (ePub)
- Preceded by: Every Heart a Doorway
- Followed by: Beneath the Sugar Sky

Down Among the Sticks and Bones is a 2017 fantasy novella by Seanan McGuire. It is the second book in the Wayward Children series and explores the history of two characters, Jack and Jill, from the previous book, Every Heart a Doorway.

In 2018, Down Among the Sticks and Bones won the American Library Association's Alex Award, as well as the RUSA Award for Fantasy.

== Plot ==
Down Among the Sticks and Bones follows identical twin sisters Jacqueline and Jillian Wolcott, whose parents were not suited to being parents. Their mother raised Jacqueline to be the perfect, feminine daughter, always dressing her in fine clothes and ensuring she never dirtied herself or acted impolite. Conversely, their father raised Jillian as though she were the little boy he had dreamed she had been, including keeping her hair short and encouraging her to be athletic and adventurous. Their parents did not pay attention the girls and their wants, seeing them only as objects of prestige to discuss with their colleagues. Each of the girls envies the other to some degree, wishing she had the opportunities of the other.

At age 12, Jacqueline and Jillian found a door where previously no door had been and stumbled into the world of the Moors, which housed mad scientists, vampires, werewolves, and other monsters. Upon arrival, they meet the Master, who is initially kind to them, though his servants hint at a darker side. The girls learn that one shall become the Master's daughter and the other an apprentice to Dr. Bleak. Although the Master favors Jacqueline's femininity over Jillian's tomboyish nature, Jacqueline opts to work with Dr. Bleak and sheds her dresses to become Jack.

Over the years, Jack trains with the mad scientist Dr. Bleak, who brings new life to the deceased, at times piecing together disparate bodies, while Jill is pampered as the Master's daughter, with aims to become an eternal vampire daughter upon her 18th birthday. The Master is jealous of any who takes too much of Jill's attention though, eventually killing any friend she makes, leaving Jill lonely and missing her sister. When Jill finds that Jack has fallen in love, Jill sees a way to potentially get her sister's attention using any means necessary.

== Characters ==
- Alexis Chopper: Jack's love interest in the Moors; daughter to Mr. and Ms. Chopper
- Chester Wolcott: father to Jack and Jill, and husband to Serena; he is described as overbearing and organized
- Dr Bleak: a mad scientist in the Moors who takes Jack as his apprentice
- Jacqueline "Jack" Wolcott: twin sister of Jill, who was raised by her mother to be very feminine; in the Moors, she becomes the apprentice under Dr Bleak
- Jillian "Jill" Wolcott: twin sister of Jack, who was raised by her father to be very masculine; in the Moors, she becomes the Master's daughter
- Louise Wolcott: grandmother to Jack and Jill
- Mary: a servant in the Master's castle
- The Master: leader in the Moors who lives in a castle, despite the suffering of the people in the surrounding village
- Mr. Chopper: father of Alexis Chopper and husband of Ms. Chopper
- Ms. Chopper: mother of Alexis Chopper and wife of Mr. Chopper
- Serena Wolcott: mother to Jack and Jill, and wife to Chester.

== Reception ==
=== Reviews ===
Down Among the Sticks and Bones was well received by critics, including starred reviews from Booklist, Kirkus Reviews, and Publishers Weekly.

Booklist's Erin Downey Howerton called the novella "exquisitely well crafted" and noted that it "is the rare companion novel that can stand alone". Downey Howerton also discussed how the novel portrayed the human "yearn[ing] for love, recognition, and belonging" as the girls "chaf[e] against rules both external and internal as they long to break free of the expectations of others".

Publishers Weekly similarly called it "exquisitely written".

Reviewers also discussed the novella's genre conventions, with Downey Howerton highlighting how McGuire "taps into the horror and romance of classic fairy tales". Kirkus Reviews noted that "the trappings of gothic fantasy act as an eloquent backdrop to this vivid portrayal of a painfully dysfunctional family".

AudioFile reviewed the audiobook, noting that "McGuire's interpretation of the characters is less than fully successful. The petulance of the adolescent characters occasionally bleeds into the rest of the narration, and her voice for the Frankenstein-like mad scientist Dr. Bleek is such a soft whisper that his dialogue is barely intelligible. Her narration is best when she captures the storytelling cadence of her witty prose".

=== Awards and honors ===
In 2017, Booklist included Down Among the Sticks and Bones on their list of the year's top ten science fiction and fantasy books, and Locus included it on their list of the year's best novellas.

Awards for Down Among the Sticks and Bones
Year	Award	Result	Ref
2018	Alex Awards	Won	
2018	Hugo Award for Best Novella	Nominated	
2018	Locus Award for Best Novella	Nominated	
2018	RUSA Award for Fantasy	Won	

== Censorship ==
In August 2025, the Lukashenko regime added the book to the List of printed publications containing information messages and materials, the distribution of which could harm the national interests of Belarus.
