= Every Heart a Doorway =

2016 novella by Seanan McGuire

- Cover of first edition
- Author: Seanan McGuire
- Language: English
- Series: Wayward Children
- Genre: Fantasy
- Publisher: Tor.com
- Publication date: April 5, 2016
- Publication place: United States
- Media type: Print (Hardcover)
- Pages: 173
- Awards: Nebula Award for Best Novella (2016); Alex Awards (2017); Hugo Award for Best Novella (2017); Locus Award for Best Novella (2017)
- ISBN: 978-0-7653-8550-5 (book); 978-0-7653-8387-7 (ePub)
- Followed by: Down Among the Sticks and Bones

Every Heart a Doorway is a fantasy novella by American writer Seanan McGuire, the first in the Wayward Children series. It was first published in hardcover and ebook editions by Tor.com in April 2016.

Every Heart a Doorway won the 2016 Nebula Award for Best Novella, as well as the 2017 Alex Award, Hugo Award for Best Novella, and Locus Award for Best Novella.

== Plot ==
Rarely, children may find doorways that transport them to other worlds. As a child, Nancy found a doorway that led her to the land of the dead, based on the story of Persephone and Hades. When she is returned to the real world, her parents do not believe her story. Nancy is sent to a boarding school for children who have had similar experiences.

The students include Kade, who spent time in a fantasy world with goblins and fairies; Jacqueline ("Jack") and Jillian ("Jill"), who spent time in a world of vampires and mad scientists; and Sumi, who spent time in a nonsense world full of candy and rainbows. The students were all altered by their time in different worlds where they were able to be their true selves, and most long to return to them.

As Nancy is getting settled at the school, Sumi is found dead. The bodies of staff member Lundy and student Loriel are found soon afterwards. Sumi's hands were amputated, Loriel's eyes were removed, and Lundy's brain was extracted. Some students believe that Nancy might be the killer, as she had been to the land of the dead; Jack is also suspected because of her association with a mad scientist.

Nancy and her friends learn that Jill is the killer. She hopes to use their body parts in order to make a key which will reopen her own doorway. Jack kills Jill, then returns to her gothic world in the hope of resurrecting her sister. Nancy finds her doorway again and returns to the land of the dead.

== Reception ==
=== Reviews ===
Every Heart a Doorway was well-received by critics, including starred reviews from Booklist and Kirkus Reviews.

Booklist's Erin Downey Howerton wrote, "This amazing fantasy pierces the shimmering veil of childhood imagination by reminding adult readers that their own doorways still exist deep in the chambers of their all-too-human hearts."

Kirkus Reviews highlighted that "McGuire understands and has true compassion (never pity) for outcasts and outliers while also making it clear that being a misfit doesn't mean you'll necessarily get along with all the other misfits, who don't fit for different reasons."

Publishers Weekly similarly wrote, "This gothic charmer is a love letter to anyone who's ever felt out of place". They noted that the "characters are strange and charming" and highlighted how "McGuire [...] puts her own inimitable spin on portal fantasy, adding horror elements to the mix".

Likewise, School Library Journal's Gretchen Crowley noted that "the characters are well drawn, and their feelings about their impossible situation are believable. The alienation they experience and their struggles to find a way back will appeal to teens."

=== Awards and honors ===
Locus included Every Heart a Doorway on their list of the top 13 recommended novellas of 2016, and the American Library Association selected it for their 2017 Rainbow Book List.

Awards for Every Heart a Doorway
Year	Award	Category	Result	Ref.
2016	Nebula Award	Novella	Won	
2016	Tiptree Award	—	Honor	
2017	Alex Awards	—	Won	
2017	British Fantasy Award	Novella	Shortlisted	
2017	Hugo Award	Novella	Won	
2017	Locus Award	Novella	Won	
2017	World Fantasy Award	Novella	Nominated	
2018	Geffen Award	Translated Fantasy Book	Nominated	

== Adaptation ==
In 2019, Syfy and Legendary Entertainment optioned to adapt the Wayward Children series into a television show adapted by Joe Tracz.

In July 2021, Paramount Pictures acquired the film rights to the Wayward Children series. Pouya Shahbazian will produce the film.

== Censorship ==
=== In the United States ===
In 2023, Every Heart a Doorway was banned in Clay County District Schools, Florida and removed from school libraries in Duval County Public Schools, with pending review for upcoming school years.

=== In other nations ===
In August 2025, the Lukashenko regime added the book to the List of printed publications containing information messages and materials, the distribution of which could harm the national interests of Belarus.
