= Nebula Award for Best Novella =

Science fiction and fantasy literary award

- Awarded for: The best science fiction or fantasy story of between 17,500 and 40,000 words published in the prior calendar year
- Presented by: Science Fiction and Fantasy Writers Association
- First award: 1966
- Most recent winner: Amal El-Mohtar (The River Has Roots)
- Website: nebulas.sfwa.org

The Nebula Award for Best Novella is given each year by the Science Fiction and Fantasy Writers Association (SFWA) for science fiction or fantasy novellas. A work of fiction is defined by the organization as a novella if it is between 17,500 and 40,000 words; awards are also given out for pieces of longer lengths in the novel category, and for shorter lengths in the short story and novelette categories. To be eligible for Nebula Award consideration, a novella must be published in English in the United States. Works published in English elsewhere in the world are also eligible, provided they are released on either a website or in an electronic edition. The Nebula Award for Best Novella has been awarded annually since 1966. Novellas published by themselves are eligible for the novel award instead, if the author requests them to be considered as such. The award has been described as one of "the most important of the American science fiction awards" and "the science-fiction and fantasy equivalent" of the Emmy Awards.

Nebula Award nominees and winners are selected by members of SFWA, although the authors of the nominees are not required to be members themselves. Each year, works are nominated by SFWA members during a period typically spanning from December 15 to January 31. The six works receiving the most nominations proceed to the final ballot, with additional nominees considered in the event of ties. Subsequently, members have about a month to vote on the final ballot, and the winners are announced at the Nebula Awards ceremony held in May. Authors are not permitted to nominate their own works, and ties in the final vote are broken, if possible, by the number of nominations the works received. The rules were changed to their current format in 2009. Previously, the eligibility period for nominations was defined as one year after the publication date of the work, which allowed the possibility for works to be nominated in the calendar year after their publication and then be awarded in the calendar year after that. Works were added to a preliminary list for the year if they had ten or more nominations, which were then voted on to create a final ballot, to which the SFWA organizing panel was also allowed to add an additional work.

During the 61 nomination years, 210 authors have had works nominated; 57 of these have won, including co-authors and ties. Nancy Kress has won the most awards: four out of eight nominations. Robert Silverberg, John Varley, and Roger Zelazny have each won twice out of eight, two, and three nominations, respectively. Silverberg's and Kress's eight nominations are the most of any authors, followed by Lucius Shepard and Michael Bishop at seven, and Kate Wilhelm and Avram Davidson with six. Bishop has the most nominations without receiving an award for novellas, though Wilhelm and Davidson have also not won an award.

== Winners and nominees ==
SFWA currently identifies the awards by the year of publication, that is, the year prior to the year in which the award is given. Entries with a yellow background and an asterisk (*) next to the writer's name have won the award; the other entries are the other nominees on the shortlist.

* Winners and joint winners

Winners and nominees
Year	Author	Novella	Publisher or publication	Ref.
1965	Brian W. Aldiss*	"The Saliva Tree"	The Magazine of Fantasy & Science Fiction	
1965	Roger Zelazny*	"He Who Shapes"	Amazing Stories	
1965	Avram Davidson	"Rogue Dragon"	The Magazine of Fantasy & Science Fiction	
1965	Samuel R. Delany	The Ballad of Beta-2	Ace Books	
1965	C. C. MacApp	"The Mercurymen"	Galaxy Science Fiction	
1965	Frederik Pohl	"Under Two Moons"	If	
1965	A. E. van Vogt	"Research Alpha"	If	
1965	James H. Schmitz	"Research Alpha"	If	
1965	Cordwainer Smith	"On the Storm Planet"	Galaxy Science Fiction	
1966	Jack Vance*	"The Last Castle"	Galaxy Science Fiction	
1966	Avram Davidson	Clash of Star-Kings	Ace Books	
1966	Charles L. Harness	"The Alchemist"	Analog Science Fact & Fiction	
1967	Michael Moorcock*	"Behold the Man"	New Worlds	
1967	Philip José Farmer	"Riders of the Purple Wage"	Dangerous Visions (Doubleday)	
1967	Anne McCaffrey	"Weyr Search"	Analog Science Fact & Fiction	
1967	Robert Silverberg	"Hawksbill Station"	Galaxy Science Fiction	
1967	Theodore Sturgeon	"If All Men Were Brothers, Would You Let One Marry Your Sister?"	Dangerous Visions (Doubleday)	
1968	Anne McCaffrey*	"Dragonrider"	Analog Science Fact & Fiction	
1968	Samuel R. Delany	"Lines of Power"	The Magazine of Fantasy & Science Fiction	
1968	Keith Laumer	"The Day Before Forever"	The Day Before Forever and Thunderhead (Doubleday)	
1968	Dean McLaughlin	"Hawk Among the Sparrows"	Analog Science Fact & Fiction	
1968	Robert Silverberg	"Nightwings"	Galaxy Science Fiction	
1969	Harlan Ellison*	"A Boy and His Dog"	The Beast That Shouted Love at the Heart of the World (Avon Books)	
1969	Charles L. Harness	"Probable Cause"	Orbit 4 (G. P. Putnam's Sons)	
1969	Fritz Leiber	"Ship of Shadows"	The Magazine of Fantasy & Science Fiction	
1969	Anne McCaffrey	"Dramatic Mission"	Analog Science Fact & Fiction	
1969	Robert Silverberg	"To Jorslem"	Galaxy Science Fiction	
1970	Fritz Leiber*	"Ill Met in Lankhmar"	The Magazine of Fantasy & Science Fiction	
1970	Poul Anderson	"The Fatal Fulfillment"	The Magazine of Fantasy & Science Fiction	
1970	James Blish	"A Style in Treason"	Anywhen (Doubleday)	
1970	Harlan Ellison	"The Region Between"	Galaxy Science Fiction	
1970	Clifford D. Simak	"The Thing in the Stone"	If	
1970	Kate Wilhelm	"April Fool's Day Forever"	Orbit 7 (G. P. Putnam's Sons)	
1971	Katherine MacLean*	"The Missing Man"	Analog Science Fact & Fiction	
1971	Jerzy Kosinski	Being There	Harcourt Brace Jovanovich	
1971	Keith Roberts	"The God House"	New Worlds Quarterly #1	
1971	Kate Wilhelm	"The Infinity Box"	Orbit 9 (G. P. Putnam's Sons)	
1971	Kate Wilhelm	"The Plastic Abyss"	Abyss (Doubleday)	
1972	Arthur C. Clarke*	"A Meeting with Medusa"	Playboy	
1972	Phyllis Gotlieb	"Son of the Morning"	The Magazine of Fantasy & Science Fiction	
1972	Ursula K. Le Guin	"The Word for World Is Forest"	Again, Dangerous Visions (Doubleday)	
1972	Richard A. Lupoff	"With the Bentfin Boomer Boys on Little Old New Alabama"	Again, Dangerous Visions (Doubleday)	
1972	Frederik Pohl	"The Gold at the Starbow's End"	Analog Science Fact & Fiction	
1972	Gene Wolfe	"The Fifth Head of Cerberus"	Orbit 10 (G. P. Putnam's Sons)	
1973	Gene Wolfe*	"The Death of Doctor Island"	Universe 3 (Random House)	
1973	Michael Bishop	"Death and Designation Among the Asadi"	If	
1973	Michael Bishop	"The White Otters of Childhood"	The Magazine of Fantasy & Science Fiction	
1973	Jack Dann	"Junction"	Fantastic	
1973	Gardner Dozois	"Chains of the Sea"	Chains of the Sea (Thomas Nelson)	
1974	Robert Silverberg*	"Born with the Dead"	The Magazine of Fantasy & Science Fiction	
1974	Michael Bishop	"On the Street of the Serpents"	Science Fiction Emphasis 1 (Ballantine Books)	
1974	George R. R. Martin	"A Song for Lya"	Analog Science Fact & Fiction	
1975	Roger Zelazny*	"Home Is the Hangman"	Analog Science Fact & Fiction	
1975	William K. Carlson	"Sunrise West"	Vertex	
1975	Lisa Tuttle	"The Storms of Windhaven"	Analog Science Fact & Fiction	
1975	George R. R. Martin	"The Storms of Windhaven"	Analog Science Fact & Fiction	
1975	James Tiptree, Jr.	"A Momentary Taste of Being"	The New Atlantis (Hawthorn Books)	
1976	James Tiptree, Jr.*	"Houston, Houston, Do You Read?"	Aurora: Beyond Equality (Gold Medal Books)	
1976	Michael Bishop	"The Samurai and the Willows"	The Magazine of Fantasy & Science Fiction	
1976	Richard Cowper	"Piper at the Gates of Dawn"	The Magazine of Fantasy & Science Fiction	
1976	Gene Wolfe	"The Eyeflash Miracles"	Future Power (Random House)	
1977	Spider Robinson*	"Stardance"	Analog Science Fact & Fiction	
1977	Jeanne Robinson*	"Stardance"	Analog Science Fact & Fiction	
1977	Vonda N. McIntyre	"Aztecs"	2076: The American Tricentennial (Pyramid Books)	
1978	John Varley*	"The Persistence of Vision"	The Magazine of Fantasy & Science Fiction	
1978	Gene Wolfe	"Seven American Nights"	Orbit 20 (Harper & Row)	
1979	Barry B. Longyear*	"Enemy Mine"	Asimov's Science Fiction	
1979	Samuel R. Delany	"The Tale of Gorgik"	Asimov's SF Adventure Magazine	
1979	Frederik Pohl	"Mars Masked"	Asimov's Science Fiction	
1979	Hilbert Schenck	"The Battle of the Abaco Reefs"	The Magazine of Fantasy & Science Fiction	
1979	Joan D. Vinge	"Fireship"	Analog Science Fact & Fiction	
1979	Richard Wilson	"The Story Writer"	Destinies	
1980	Suzy McKee Charnas*	"Unicorn Tapestry"	New Dimensions 11 (Pocket Books)	
1980	Avram Davidson	"There Beneath the Silky-Trees and Whelmed in Deeper Gulphs Than Me"	Other Worlds 2 (Zebra Books)	
1980	Gordon R. Dickson	"Lost Dorsai"	Destinies	
1980	Thomas M. Disch	"The Brave Little Toaster"	The Magazine of Fantasy & Science Fiction	
1980	Marta Randall	"Dangerous Games"	The Magazine of Fantasy & Science Fiction	
1980	Michael Shea	"The Autopsy"	The Magazine of Fantasy & Science Fiction	
1981	Poul Anderson*	"The Saturn Game"	Analog Science Fact & Fiction	
1981	Gregory Benford	"Swarmer, Skimmer"	SF Digest	
1981	Jack Dann	"Amnesia"	The Berkley Showcase, Vol 3 (Berkley Books)	
1981	Phyllis Eisenstein	"In the Western Tradition"	The Magazine of Fantasy & Science Fiction	
1981	Vernor Vinge	"True Names"	Binary Star 5 (Dell Publishing)	
1981	Kate Wilhelm	"The Winter Beach"	Redbook	
1982	John Kessel*	"Another Orphan"	The Magazine of Fantasy & Science Fiction	
1982	Fritz Leiber	"Horrible Imaginings"	Death (Playboy)	
1982	Brad Linaweaver	"Moon of Ice"	Amazing Stories	
1982	George R. R. Martin	"Unsound Variations"	Amazing Stories	
1982	Joanna Russ	"Souls"	The Magazine of Fantasy & Science Fiction	
1983	Greg Bear*	"Hardfought"	Asimov's Science Fiction	
1983	Michael Bishop	"The Gospel According to Gamaliel Crucis"	Asimov's Science Fiction	
1983	Michael Bishop	"Her Habiline Husband"	Universe 13 (Doubleday)	
1983	Avram Davidson	"Eszterhazy and the Autogóndola-Invention"	Amazing Stories	
1983	Vonda N. McIntyre	"Transit"	Asimov's Science Fiction	
1983	Robert Silverberg	"Homefaring"	Amazing Stories	
1984	John Varley*	"Press Enter ■"	Asimov's Science Fiction	
1984	Avram Davidson	"Young Doctor Eszterhazy"	Amazing Stories	
1984	Nancy Kress	"Trinity"	Asimov's Science Fiction	
1984	Frederik Pohl	"The Greening of Bed-Stuy"	The Magazine of Fantasy & Science Fiction	
1984	Lucius Shepard	"A Traveler's Tale"	Asimov's Science Fiction	
1984	Michael Swanwick	"Marrow Death"	Asimov's Science Fiction	
1985	Robert Silverberg*	"Sailing to Byzantium"	Asimov's Science Fiction	
1985	Kim Stanley Robinson	"Green Mars"	Asimov's Science Fiction	
1985	Bruce Sterling	"Green Days in Brunei"	Asimov's Science Fiction	
1985	James Tiptree, Jr.	"The Only Neat Thing to Do"	The Magazine of Fantasy & Science Fiction	
1985	Kate Wilhelm	"The Gorgon Field"	Asimov's Science Fiction	
1985	Roger Zelazny	"24 Views of Mt. Fuji, by Hokusai"	Asimov's Science Fiction	
1986	Lucius Shepard*	"R&R"	Asimov's Science Fiction	
1986	Gregory Benford	"Newton Sleep"	The Magazine of Fantasy & Science Fiction	
1986	Kim Stanley Robinson	"Escape from Kathmandu"	Asimov's Science Fiction	
1986	Robert Silverberg	"Gilgamesh in the Outback"	Asimov's Science Fiction	
1986	F. Paul Wilson	"Dydeetown Girl"	Far Frontiers 4 (Baen Books)	
1987	Kim Stanley Robinson*	"The Blind Geometer"	Asimov's Science Fiction	
1987	John M. Ford	"Fugue State"	Under the Wheel (Baen Books)	
1987	Keith Roberts	"The Tiger Sweater"	Fantasy & Science Fiction	
1987	Geoff Ryman	The Unconquered Country	Bantam Spectra	
1987	Robert Silverberg	"The Secret Sharer"	Asimov's Science Fiction	
1987	Walter Jon Williams	"Witness"	Wild Cards (Bantam Spectra)	
1988	Connie Willis*	"The Last of the Winnebagos"	Asimov's Science Fiction	
1988	Bradley Denton	"The Calvin Coolidge Home for Dead Comedians"	Fantasy & Science Fiction	
1988	Lucius Shepard	The Scalehunter's Beautiful Daughter	Asimov's Science Fiction	
1988	Norman Spinrad	"Journals of the Plague Years"	Full Spectrum (Bantam Spectra)	
1988	Walter Jon Williams	"Surfacing"	Asimov's Science Fiction	
1988	Jane Yolen	The Devil's Arithmetic	Viking Kestrel	
1989	Lois McMaster Bujold*	"The Mountains of Mourning"	Analog Science Fact & Fiction	
1989	John Crowley	"Great Work of Time"	Novelty (Doubleday)	
1989	George Alec Effinger	"Marîd Changes His Mind"	Asimov's Science Fiction	
1989	Megan Lindholm	"A Touch of Lavender"	Asimov's Science Fiction	
1989	Judith Moffett	"Tiny Tango"	Asimov's Science Fiction	
1989	Howard Waldrop	A Dozen Tough Jobs	Mark V. Ziesing	
1990	Joe Haldeman*	"The Hemingway Hoax"	Asimov's Science Fiction	
1990	Lois McMaster Bujold	"Weatherman"	Analog Science Fact & Fiction	
1990	Pat Cadigan	"Fool to Believe"	Asimov's Science Fiction	
1990	James Patrick Kelly	"Mr. Boy"	Asimov's Science Fiction	
1990	Pat Murphy	"Bones"	Asimov's Science Fiction	
1991	Nancy Kress*	"Beggars in Spain"	Asimov's Science Fiction	
1991	Paul Ash	"Man Opening a Door"	Analog Science Fact & Fiction	
1991	Michael Bishop	Apartheid, Superstrings, and Mordecai Thubana	Axolotl Press	
1991	Mike Resnick	Bully!	Asimov's Science Fiction	
1991	Kristine Kathryn Rusch	The Gallery of His Dreams	Asimov's Science Fiction	
1991	Connie Willis	"Jack"	Asimov's Science Fiction	
1992	James Morrow*	City of Truth	St. Martin's Press	
1992	Emma Bull	"Silver or Gold"	After the King: Stories in Honor of J.R.R. Tolkien (Tor Books)	
1992	Bradley Denton	"The Territory"	Fantasy & Science Fiction	
1992	Jerry Oltion	"Contact"	Analog Science Fiction and Fact	
1992	Lee Goodloe	"Contact"	Analog Science Fiction and Fact	
1992	Maureen F. McHugh	"Protection"	Asimov's Science Fiction	
1992	Lucius Shepard	"Barnacle Bill the Spacer"	Asimov's Science Fiction	
1992	Michael Swanwick	Griffin's Egg	Asimov's Science Fiction	
1993	Jack Cady*	"The Night We Buried Road Dog"	Fantasy & Science Fiction	
1993	Ray Aldridge	"The Beauty Addict"	Full Spectrum 4 (Bantam Spectra)	
1993	Nancy Kress	"Dancing on Air"	Asimov's Science Fiction	
1993	G. David Nordley	"Into the Miranda Rift"	Analog Science Fiction and Fact	
1993	Kate Wilhelm	Naming the Flowers	Fantasy & Science Fiction	
1993	Walter Jon Williams	Wall, Stone, Craft	Fantasy & Science Fiction	
1994	Mike Resnick*	"Seven Views of Olduvai Gorge"	Fantasy & Science Fiction	
1994	Harlan Ellison	Mefisto In Onyx	Omni	
1994	Nina Kiriki Hoffman	"Haunted Humans"	Fantasy & Science Fiction	
1994	Ursula K. Le Guin	"Forgiveness Day"	Asimov's Science Fiction	
1994	Geoff Ryman	"Fan"	Unconquered Countries (St. Martin's Press)	
1994	Michael Swanwick	"Cold Iron"	Asimov's Science Fiction	
1995	Elizabeth Hand*	"Last Summer at Mars Hill"	Fantasy & Science Fiction	
1995	Gregory Benford	"Soon Comes Night"	Asimov's Science Fiction	
1995	Nicola Griffith	"Yaguara"	Asimov's Science Fiction	
1995	Mike Resnick	"Bibi"	Asimov's Science Fiction	
1995	Susan Shwartz	"Bibi"	Asimov's Science Fiction	
1995	Brian Stableford	"Mortimer Gray's History of Death"	Asimov's Science Fiction	
1996	Jack Dann*	"Da Vinci Rising"	Asimov's Science Fiction	
1996	Ursula K. Le Guin	"A Woman's Liberation"	Asimov's Science Fiction	
1996	George R. R. Martin	"Blood of the Dragon"	Asimov's Science Fiction	
1996	Jack McDevitt	"Time Travelers Never Die"	Asimov's Science Fiction	
1996	Maureen F. McHugh	"The Cost to Be Wise"	Starlight 1 (Tor Books)	
1996	Allen Steele	"The Death of Captain Future"	Asimov's Science Fiction	
1997	Jerry Oltion*	"Abandon in Place"	Fantasy & Science Fiction	
1997	Adam-Troy Castro	"The Funeral March of the Marionettes"	Fantasy & Science Fiction	
1997	Paul Levinson	"Loose Ends"	Analog Science Fiction and Fact	
1997	Robert Reed	"Chrysalis"	Asimov's Science Fiction	
1997	Bud Sparhawk	"Primrose and Thorn"	Analog Science Fiction and Fact	
1997	Allen Steele	"…Where Angels Fear to Tread"	Asimov's Science Fiction	
1998	Sheila Finch*	"Reading the Bones"	Fantasy & Science Fiction	
1998	Catherine Asaro	"Aurora in Four Voices"	Analog Science Fiction and Fact	
1998	Avram Davidson	The Boss in the Wall, A Treatise on the House Devil	Tachyon Publications	
1998	Grania Davis	The Boss in the Wall, A Treatise on the House Devil	Tachyon Publications	
1998	Eliot Fintushel	"Izzy and the Father of Terror"	Asimov's Science Fiction	
1998	David Gerrold	"Jumping Off the Planet"	Science Fiction Age	
1998	Geoffrey A. Landis	"Ecopoiesis"	Science Fiction Age	
1999	Ted Chiang*	"Story of Your Life"	Starlight 2 (Tor Books)	
1999	Michael A. Burstein	"Reality Check"	Analog Science Fiction and Fact	
1999	Adam-Troy Castro	"The Astronaut from Wyoming"	Analog Science Fiction and Fact	
1999	Jerry Oltion	"The Astronaut from Wyoming"	Analog Science Fiction and Fact	
1999	L. Timmel Duchamp	"Living Trust"	Asimov's Science Fiction	
1999	Andy Duncan	"The Executioners' Guild"	Asimov's Science Fiction	
1999	David Marusek	"The Wedding Album"	Asimov's Science Fiction	
2000	Linda Nagata*	"Goddesses"	Sci Fiction	
2000	Andy Duncan	"Fortitude"	Realms of Fantasy	
2000	Jonathan Lethem	"Ninety Percent of Everything"	Fantasy & Science Fiction	
2000	James Patrick Kelly	"Ninety Percent of Everything"	Fantasy & Science Fiction	
2000	John Kessel	"Ninety Percent of Everything"	Fantasy & Science Fiction	
2000	Mike Resnick	"Hunting the Snark"	Asimov's Science Fiction	
2000	Lucius Shepard	"Crocodile Rock"	Fantasy & Science Fiction	
2000	Walter Jon Williams	"Argonautica"	Asimov's Science Fiction	
2001	Jack Williamson*	"The Ultimate Earth"	Analog Science Fiction and Fact	
2001	Catherine Asaro	"A Roll of the Dice"	Analog Science Fiction and Fact	
2001	Brenda W. Clough	"May Be Some Time"	Analog Science Fiction and Fact	
2001	Jack Dann	"The Diamond Pit"	Fantasy & Science Fiction	
2001	Lucius Shepard	"Radiant Green Star"	Asimov's Science Fiction	
2002	Richard Chwedyk*	"Bronte's Egg"	Fantasy & Science Fiction	
2002	Adam-Troy Castro	"Sunday Night Yams at Minnie and Earl's"	Analog Science Fiction and Fact	
2002	Andy Duncan	"The Chief Designer"	Asimov's Science Fiction	
2002	Charles Coleman Finlay	"The Political Officer"	Fantasy & Science Fiction	
2002	Bud Sparhawk	"Magic's Price"	Analog Science Fiction and Fact	
2003	Neil Gaiman*	Coraline	HarperCollins	
2003	Eleanor Arnason	"The Potter of Bones"	Asimov's Science Fiction	
2003	Kage Baker	"The Empress of Mars"	Asimov's Science Fiction	
2003	John Kessel	"Stories for Men"	Asimov's Science Fiction	
2003	Ian R. MacLeod	"Breathmoss"	Asimov's Science Fiction	
2004	Walter Jon Williams*	"The Green Leopard Plague"	Asimov's Science Fiction	
2004	Catherine Asaro	"Walk in Silence"	Analog Science Fiction and Fact	
2004	Adam-Troy Castro	"The Tangled Strings of the Marionettes"	Fantasy & Science Fiction	
2004	Vernor Vinge	"The Cookie Monster"	Analog Science Fiction and Fact	
2004	Connie Willis	"Just Like the Ones We Used to Know"	Asimov's Science Fiction	
2005	Kelly Link*	"Magic for Beginners"	Fantasy & Science Fiction	
2005	Bud Sparhawk	"Clay's Pride"	Analog Science Fiction and Fact	
2005	Robert J. Sawyer	"Identity Theft"	Down These Dark Spaceways (Science Fiction Book Club)	
2005	Paul Witcover	"Left of the Dial"	Sci Fiction	
2005	Albert E. Cowdrey	"The Tribes of Bela"	Fantasy & Science Fiction	
2006	James Patrick Kelly*	Burn	Tachyon Publications	
2006	Michael A. Burstein	"Sanctuary"	Analog Science Fiction and Fact	
2006	Paul Melko	"The Walls of the Universe"	Asimov's Science Fiction	
2006	William Shunn	"Inclination"	Asimov's Science Fiction	
2007	Nancy Kress*	"Fountain of Age"	Asimov's Science Fiction	
2007	Judith Berman	"Awakening"	Black Gate	
2007	Matt Hughes	"The Helper and His Hero"	Fantasy & Science Fiction	
2007	Lucius Shepard	"Stars Seen Through Stone"	Fantasy & Science Fiction	
2007	Bruce Sterling	"Kiosk"	Fantasy & Science Fiction	
2007	Gene Wolfe	"Memorare"	Fantasy & Science Fiction	
2008	Catherine Asaro*	"The Spacetime Pool"	Analog Science Fiction and Fact	
2008	Gregory Benford	"Dark Heaven"	Alien Crimes (Science Fiction Book Club)	
2008	Kelley Eskridge	"Dangerous Space"	Dangerous Space (Aqueduct Press)	
2008	Charles Coleman Finlay	"The Political Prisoner"	Fantasy & Science Fiction	
2008	Vera Nazarian	The Duke in His Castle	Norilana Books	
2009	Kage Baker*	The Women of Nell Gwynne's	Subterranean Press	
2009	Carolyn Ives Gilman	"Arkfall"	Fantasy & Science Fiction	
2009	Nancy Kress	"Act One"	Asimov's Science Fiction	
2009	James Morrow	Shambling Towards Hiroshima	Tachyon Publications	
2009	Jason Sanford	"Sublimation Angels"	Interzone	
2009	John Scalzi	The God Engines	Subterranean Press	
2010	Rachel Swirsky*	"The Lady Who Plucked Red Flowers Beneath the Queen's Window"	Subterranean Magazine	
2010	Paolo Bacigalupi	The Alchemist	Subterranean Press	
2010	J. Kathleen Cheney	"Iron Shoes"	Alembical 2 (Paper Golem)	
2010	Ted Chiang	The Lifecycle of Software Objects	Subterranean Press	
2010	Geoffrey A. Landis	"The Sultan of the Clouds"	Asimov's Science Fiction	
2010	Paul Park	"Ghosts Doing the Orange Dance"	Fantasy & Science Fiction	
2011	Kij Johnson*	"The Man Who Bridged the Mist"	Asimov's Science Fiction	
2011	Mary Robinette Kowal	"Kiss Me Twice"	Asimov's Science Fiction	
2011	Catherynne M. Valente	Silently and Very Fast	Clarkesworld Magazine	
2011	Carolyn Ives Gilman	"The Ice Owl"	Fantasy & Science Fiction	
2011	Ken Liu	"The Man Who Ended History: A Documentary"	Panverse 3 (Panverse Publishing)	
2011	Adam-Troy Castro	"With Unclean Hands"	Analog Science Fiction and Fact	
2012	Nancy Kress*	After the Fall, Before the Fall, During the Fall	Tachyon Publications	
2012	Aliette de Bodard	On a Red Station, Drifting	Immersion Press	
2012	Jay Lake	"The Stars Do Not Lie"	Asimov's Science Fiction	
2012	Ken Liu	"All the Flavors"	GigaNotoSaurus	
2012	Robert Reed	"Katabasis"	Fantasy & Science Fiction	
2012	Lawrence M. Schoen	"Barry's Tale"	Buffalito Buffet (Hadley Rille Books)	
2013	Vylar Kaftan*	"The Weight of the Sunrise"	Asimov's Science Fiction	
2013	Andy Duncan	"Wakulla Springs"	Tor.com	
2013	Ellen Klages	"Wakulla Springs"	Tor.com	
2013	Nancy Kress	"Annabel Lee"	New Under the Sun (Phoenix Pick)	
2013	Veronica Schanoes	"Burning Girls"	Tor.com	
2013	Lawrence M. Schoen	"Trial of the Century"	Lawrencemschoen.com	
2013	Catherynne M. Valente	Six-Gun Snow White	Subterranean Press	
2014	Nancy Kress*	Yesterday's Kin	Tachyon Publications	
2014	Daryl Gregory	We Are All Completely Fine	Tachyon Publications	
2014	Ken Liu	"The Regular"	Upgraded (Wyrm Publishing)	
2014	Mary Rickert	"The Mothers of Voorhisville"	Tor.com	
2014	Lawrence M. Schoen	Calendrical Regression	NobleFusion Press	
2014	Rachel Swirsky	"Grand Jeté (The Great Leap)"	Subterranean Magazine	
2015	Nnedi Okorafor*	Binti	Tor.com	
2015	C. S. E. Cooney	The Bone Swans of Amandale	Bone Swans: Stories (Mythic Delirium)	
2015	Eugene Fischer	"The New Mother"	Asimov's Science Fiction	
2015	Usman T. Malik	"The Pauper Prince and the Eucalyptus Jinn"	Tor.com	
2015	Kelly Robson	"Waters of Versailles"	Tor.com	
2015	Beth Cato	Wings of Sorrow and Bone	Harper Voyager Impulse	
2016	Seanan McGuire*	Every Heart a Doorway	Tor.com Publishing	
2016	S. B. Divya	Runtime	Tor.com Publishing	
2016	Kij Johnson	The Dream-Quest of Vellitt Boe	Tor.com Publishing	
2016	Victor LaValle	The Ballad of Black Tom	Tor.com Publishing	
2016	John P. Murphy	"The Liar"	Fantasy & Science Fiction	
2016	Kai Ashante Wilson	A Taste of Honey	Tor.com Publishing	
2017	Martha Wells*	All Systems Red	Tor.com	
2017	Sarah Gailey	River of Teeth	Tor.com Publishing	
2017	Ellen Klages	Passing Strange	Tor.com Publishing	
2017	Sarah Pinsker	"And Then There Were (N-One)"	Uncanny Magazine	
2017	Lawrence M. Schoen	Barry's Deal	NobleFusion Press	
2017	JY Yang	The Black Tides of Heaven	Tor.com Publishing	
2018	Aliette de Bodard*	The Tea Master and the Detective	Subterranean Press	
2018	Kate Heartfield	Alice Payne Arrives	Tor.com Publishing	
2018	Martha Wells	Artificial Condition	Tor.com Publishing	
2018	P. Djèlí Clark	The Black God's Drums	Tor.com Publishing	
2018	Jonathan P. Brazee	Fire Ant	Semper Fi Press	
2018	Kelly Robson	Gods, Monsters, and the Lucky Peach	Tor.com Publishing	
2019	Amal El-Mohtar*	This Is How You Lose the Time War	Saga Press	
2019	Max Gladstone*	This Is How You Lose the Time War	Saga Press	
2019	Ted Chiang	"Anxiety Is the Dizziness of Freedom"	Exhalation: Stories (Alfred A. Knopf)	
2019	P. Djèlí Clark	The Haunting of Tram Car 015	Tor.com Publishing	
2019	Vylar Kaftan	Her Silhouette, Drawn in Water	Tor.com Publishing	
2019	Rivers Solomon	The Deep	Saga Press	
2019	Daveed Diggs	The Deep	Saga Press	
2019	William Hutson	The Deep	Saga Press	
2019	Jonathan Snipes	The Deep	Saga Press	
2019	A. C. Wise	Catfish Lullaby	Broken Eye Books	
2020	P. Djèlí Clark*	Ring Shout	Tor.com Publishing	
2020	Yaroslav Barsukov	Tower of Mud and Straw	Metaphorosis Magazine	
2020	Nino Cipri	Finna	Tor.com Publishing	
2020	Ekpeki Oghenechovwe Donald	"Ife-Iyoku, the Tale of Imadeyunuagbon"	Dominion: An Anthology of Speculative Fiction From Africa and the African Diaspora (Aurelia Leo)	
2020	R. B. Lemberg	The Four Profound Weaves	Tachyon Publications	
2020	Tochi Onyebuchi	Riot Baby	Tor.com Publishing	
2021	Premee Mohamed*	And What Can We Offer You Tonight	Neon Hemlock Press	
2021	Becky Chambers	A Psalm for the Wild-Built	Tordotcom	
2021	Aliette de Bodard	Fireheart Tiger	Tordotcom	
2021	Aimee Ogden	Sun-Daughters, Sea-Daughters	Tordotcom	
2021	Zin E. Rocklyn	Flowers for the Sea	Tordotcom	
2021	E. Catherine Tobler	The Necessity of Stars	Neon Hemlock Press	
2021	Eugenia Triantafyllou	"The Giants of the Violet Sea"	Uncanny Magazine	
2022	C. L. Polk*	Even Though I Knew the End	Tordotcom	
2022	Becky Chambers	A Prayer for the Crown-Shy	Tordotcom	
2022	R. S. A. Garcia	"Bishop's Opening"	Clarkesworld Magazine	
2022	Jordan Kurella	I Never Liked You Anyway	Vernacular Books	
2022	Kelly Robson	High Times in the Low Parliament	Tordotcom	
2023	Ai Jiang*	"Linghun"	Dark Matter Ink	
2023	Kelly Barnhill	The Crane Husband	Tordotcom	
2023	Ursula Vernon (as T. Kingfisher)	Thornhedge	Tor, Titan UK	
2023	Fonda Lee	Untethered Sky	Tordotcom	
2023	Malka Older	The Mimicking of Known Successes	Tordotcom	
2023	Nghi Vo	Mammoths at the Gates	Tordotcom	
2024	A. D. Sui*	The Dragonfly Gambit	Neon Hemlock Press	
2024	Premee Mohamed	The Butcher of the Forest	Tordotcom	
2024	Suzan Palumbo	Countess	ECW Press	
2024	Suyi Davies Okungbowa	Lost Ark Dreaming	Tordotcom	
2024	Sofia Samatar	The Practice, the Horizon, and the Chain	Tordotcom	
2024	Ray Nayler	The Tusks of Extinction	Tordotcom	
2025	Amal El-Mohtar*	The River Has Roots	Tordotcom, Arcadia Books	
2025	Renan Bernardo	Disgraced Return of the Kap's Needle	Dark Matter INK	
2025	Jordan Kurella	The Death of Mountains	Lethe Press	
2025	Annalee Newitz	Automatic Noodle	Tordotcom	
2025	Hache Pueyo	But Not Too Bold	Tordotcom	
2025	Wole Talabi	"Descent"	Clarkesworld Magazine	

== See also ==
- Hugo Award for Best Novella
