= Tor Double Novels =

Science fiction series

Tor Doubles are a series of science fiction books published by Tor Books between 1988 and 1991, mostly in tête-bêche format. The series was inspired by the Ace Doubles, published between 1952 and 1973.

== Titles in the series ==
This list is complete and includes ISBN numbers for the United States.

#	First book	Second book	Publication date	ISBN
1	Arthur C. Clarke; A Meeting with Medusa	Kim Stanley Robinson; Green Mars	October 1988	0-8125-3362-3
2	Greg Bear; Hardfought	Timothy Zahn; Cascade Point	November 1988	0-8125-5971-1
3	Robert Silverberg; Born With The Dead	Brian W. Aldiss; The Saliva Tree	December 1988	0-8125-5952-5
4	John Varley; Tango Charlie and Foxtrot Romeo	Samuel R. Delany; The Star Pit	January 1989	0-8125-5956-8
5	Poul Anderson; No Truce With Kings	Fritz Leiber; Ship of Shadows	February 1989	0-8125-5958-4
6	Barry B. Longyear; Enemy Mine	John Kessel; Another Orphan	March 1989	0-8125-5963-0
7	Vonda N. McIntyre; Screwtop	James Tiptree, Jr. The Girl Who Was Plugged In	April 1989	0-8125-4554-0
8	Leigh Brackett; The Nemesis From Terra	Edmond Hamilton; Battle for the Stars	May 1989	0-8125-5960-6
9	Isaac Asimov; The Ugly Little Boy	Theodore Sturgeon; The [Widget], the [Wadget], and Boff	June 1989	0-8125-5966-5
10	Robert Silverberg; Sailing to Byzantium	Gene Wolfe; Seven American Nights	July 1989	0-8125-5924-X
11	James Tiptree, Jr. Houston, Houston, Do You Read?	Joanna Russ; Souls	August 1989	0-8125-5962-2
12	Roger Zelazny; He Who Shapes	Kate Wilhelm; The Infinity Box	September 1989	0-8125-5879-0
13	Kim Stanley Robinson; The Blind Geometer	Ursula K. Le Guin; The New Atlantis	October 1989	0-8125-0010-5
14	Poul Anderson; The Saturn Game	Gregory Benford and Paul A. Carter; Iceborn	November 1989	0-8125-0277-9
15	Jack Vance; The Last Castle	Robert Silverberg; Nightwings	December 1989	0-8125-0194-2
16	James Tiptree, Jr. The Color of Neanderthal Eyes	Michael Bishop; And Strange At Ecbatan The Trees	January 1990	0-8125-5964-9
17	L. Sprague de Camp; Divide and Rule	Leigh Brackett; The Sword of Rhiannon	February 1990	0-8125-0362-7
18	C.L. Moore; Vintage Season	Robert Silverberg; In Another Country (Note: This is a sequel to the first book, and is bound together the same way up: i.e. not in tête-bêche format)	February 1990	0-8125-0193-4
19	Fritz Leiber; Ill Met in Lankhmar	Charles de Lint; The Fair in Emain Macha	March 1990	0-8125-0821-1
20	L. Sprague de Camp; The Wheels of If	Harry Turtledove; The Pugnacious Peacemaker	April 1990	0-8125-0202-7
21	Roger Zelazny; Home is the Hangman	Samuel R. Delany; We, In Some Strange Power's Employ, Move On A Rigorous Line	May 1990	0-8125-0983-8
22	Leigh Brackett; The Jewel of Bas	Karen Haber; Thieves' Carnival	June 1990	0-8125-0272-8
23	Norman Spinrad; Riding The Torch	Joan D. Vinge; The Tin Soldier	July 1990	0-8125-0551-4
24	Roger Zelazny; The Graveyard Heart	Walter Jon Williams; Elegy For Angels And Dogs	August 1990	0-8125-0275-2
25	John M. Ford; Fugue State	Gene Wolfe; The Death of Doctor Island	September 1990	0-8125-0813-0
26	John Varley; Press Enter■	Robert Silverberg; Hawksbill Station	October 1990	0-8125-5948-7
27	Orson Scott Card; Eye For Eye	Lloyd Biggle, Jr. The Tunesmith (Note: This is not in tête-bêche format)	November 1990	0-8125-0854-8
28	Kim Stanley Robinson; A Short Sharp Shock	Jack Vance; The Dragon Masters	December 1990	0-8125-0895-5
29	Ian Watson; Nanoware Time	John Varley; The Persistence of Vision	January 1991	0-8125-5940-1
30	Poul Anderson; The Longest Voyage	Steve Popkes; Slow Lightning	March 1991	0-8125-1170-0
31	Gordon R. Dickson; Naked To The Stars	Gordon R. Dickson; The Alien Way	February 1991	0-8125-0396-1
32	Harlan Ellison; Run For The Stars	Jack Dann and Jack C. Haldeman II; Echoes of Thunder	April 1991	0-8125-1180-8
33	Mike Resnick; Bwana	Mike Resnick; Bully	May 1991	0-8125-1246-4
34	Damon Knight; Rule Golden	Damon Knight; Double Meaning	June 1991	0-8125-1294-4
35	Dean Ing; Silent Thunder	Robert A. Heinlein; Universe	July 1991	0-8125-0265-5
36	Fritz Leiber; Conjure Wife	Fritz Leiber; Our Lady Of Darkness	August 1991	0-8125-1296-0

At least one more in the series was prepared but never published: Esther Friesner's Yesterday We Saw Mermaids paired with Lawrence Watt-Evans's The Final Folly of Captain Dancy would have been series number 37.
