= Getting to Know You =

"Getting to Know You" may refer to:

- "Getting to Know You" (song), a 1951 show tune from The King and I
- Getting to Know You (short story), a 1998 science fiction short story by David Marusek
- Getting to Know You (short story collection), a 2007 science fiction short story collection by David Marusek
- Getting to Know You (1999 film), a 1999 film starring Heather Matarazzo and Sonja Sohn
- Getting to Know You (2005 film), a 2005 film starring Ian Gomez
- Getting to Know You (album), a 1995 album by Mulgrew Miller

== See also ==
- Get to Know You (disambiguation)
