= May Be Some Time =

2001 novella by Brenda Clough

- Author: Brenda Clough
- Language: English
- Genre: Science fiction
- Published: April 2001
- Publisher: Analog Science Fiction and Fact
- Publication place: United States
- Media type: Print (magazine), anthology
- Awards: Finalist – Hugo Award for Best Novella (2002), Nebula Award for Best Novella (2001)
- Followed by: Revise the World (2008)

May Be Some Time is a science fiction novella by Brenda Clough. First published in Analog Science Fiction and Fact in April 2001, it was subsequently republished in The Year's Best Science Fiction: Nineteenth Annual Collection (2002), The Mammoth Book of Best New Science Fiction: 15th Annual Collection (2002), and The Fifth Science Fiction Megapack: 25 Modern and Classic Science Fiction Stories (2012). In addition, it appeared as the first portion of Clough's 2008 novel Revise the World.

== Synopsis ==
Lawrence "Titus" Oates wakes up in a hospital bed in the year 2045 and learns that the future which rescued him is an even more challenging environment than the Antarctic.

== Reception ==
May Be Some Time was a finalist for the 2002 Hugo Award for Best Novella and the Nebula Award for Best Novella of 2001.
