= Modern Classic Short Novels of Science Fiction =

- Cover of first edition
- Author: edited by Gardner Dozois
- Cover artist: Kim Poor
- Language: English
- Genre: Science fiction
- Publisher: St. Martin's Press
- Publication date: 1994
- Publication place: United States
- Media type: Print (hardcover)
- Pages: xii, 657 pp.
- ISBN: 0-312-10504-5

Modern Classic Short Novels of Science Fiction is an anthology of science fiction short works edited by American writers Gardner Dozois. It was first published in hardcover by St. Martin's Griffin in February 1994, which also issued a trade paperback edition in September of the same year and an ebook edition in October 2014. A Science Fiction Book Club edition appeared in hardcover in February 1994. The first British edition was issued in hardcover by Robinson in July 1994 under the variant title The Mammoth Book of Contemporary SF Masters.

== Summary ==
The book collects thirteen novellas and novelettes by various science fiction authors, together with a preface by the editor.

== Contents ==
- "Preface" (Gardner Dozois)
- "The Miracle Workers" (Jack Vance)
- "The Longest Voyage" (Poul Anderson)
- "On the Storm Planet" (Cordwainer Smith)
- "The Star Pit" (Samuel R. Delany)
- "Total Environment" (Brian W. Aldiss)
- "The Merchants of Venus" (Frederik Pohl)
- "The Death of Doctor Island" (Gene Wolfe)
- "Where Late the Sweet Birds Sang" (Kate Wilhelm)
- "Souls" (Joanna Russ)
- "A Traveler's Tale" (Lucius Shepard)
- "Sailing to Byzantium" (Robert Silverberg)
- "Mr. Boy" (James Patrick Kelly)
- "And Wild for to Hold" (Nancy Kress)
