= Lawrence M. Schoen =

American writer and psychologist (born 1959)

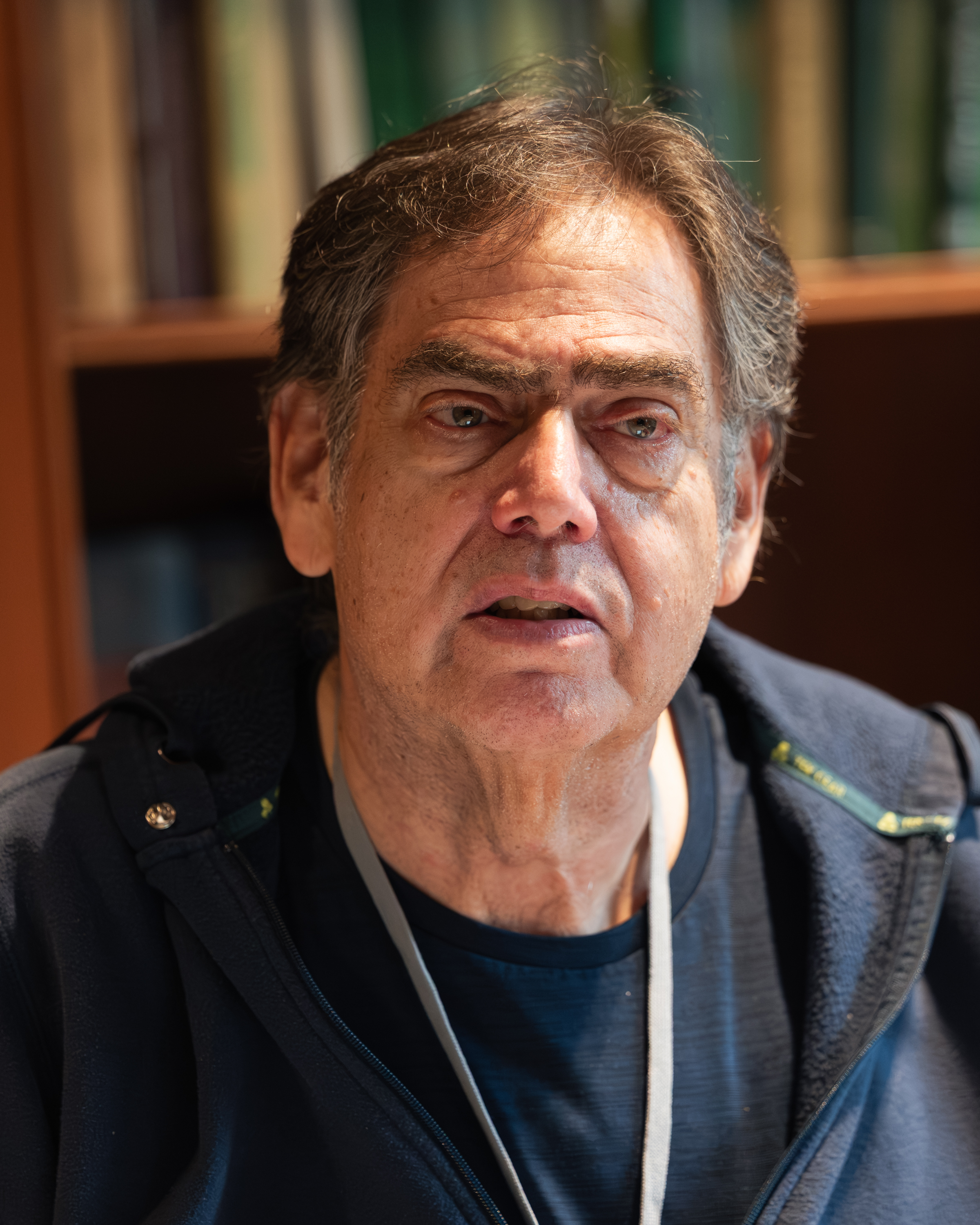
- Schoen at RavenCon in 2026
- Born: July 27, 1959 (age 67); Chicago, Illinois, U.S.
- Education: California State University, Northridge (BS); Kansas State University (MS, PhD)
- Occupations: Psychologist; researcher; publisher; author
- Writing career
- Genres: Science fiction, fantasy
- Website: lawrencemschoen.com

Lawrence M. Schoen (born July 27, 1959) is an American author, publisher, psychologist, and expert in the Klingon language.

== Biography ==
Schoen was born in Chicago, Illinois, but his family moved to Southern California when he was 18 months old, and he grew up in Culver City.

In 1983, he graduated with B.S. in psycholinguistics from California State University, Northridge.

Schoen spent the next ten years in academia as an assistant professor at New College of Florida, Lake Forest College in Illinois, and Chestnut Hill College in Pennsylvania. He then moved to the private sector and served for about 17 years as the director of research and analytics for a medical center which provides mental health and addiction treatment service works throughout Philadelphia.

Schoen lives in Blue Bell, Pennsylvania.

== Author ==
He has been nominated for the Astounding Award for Best New Writer, the Hugo Award for Best Short Story, the Nebula Award for Best Novella three times, as well as receiving nominations for the Nebula Award for Best Novel.

== Small press publisher ==
Schoen is the publisher and chief editor for Paper Golem, a speculative fiction small press started in November, 2006. In its Alembical series, J. Kathleen Cheney's novella "Iron Shoes", from Alembical 2, received a nomination for the Nebula Award.

== Bibliography ==
=== The Universe of Barsk (Series) ===
- Barsk: The Elephants' Graveyard (Dec 2015), Tor Books (ISBN 9780765377036) Nebula Award Finalist,

=== The Conroyverse ===
==== The Amazing Conroy (series) ====
Notable works in chronological story order:

  - Yesterdays Taste, (October 2011) in Transtories, Aeon Press (ISBN 1-8725-8821-2) WSFA Small Press Award Finalist
- Barry's Tale (Book 2) December 2012) in Buffalito Buffet, Hadley Rille Books (ISBN 0-9849-6708-7) Nebula Award Finalist 2012
- Calendrical Regression (Book 3) (November 2014), Noble Fusion Press (ISBN 0-9915-0013-X) Nebula Award Finalist 2014
- Barry's Deal (Book 4) (November 2017), Noble Fusion Press (ISBN 0-9915-0017-2) Nebula Award Finalist 2017
- Trial of the Century (Book 6) (December 2013), in World Jumping, Hadley Rille Books (ISBN 0-9892-6317-7) Nebula Award Finalist 2013

===== Omnibus Editions =====
- Galactic Capers of the Amazing Conroy (August 2020) Paper Golem LLC (ISBN 978-1951391331). An omnibus edition featuring the four Novella award nominated novellas from the series: Barry's Tale (Finalist), Calendrical Regression (Finalist), Barry's Deal (Finalist) and Trial of the Century (Finalist).

== Awards and nominations ==
- 2007 - John W. Campbell Award for Best New Writer (nominee). As of 2020 known as the "Astounding Award"
- 2010 - Hugo Award for Best Short Story (nominee) - "The Moment"
- 2012 - WSFA Small Press Award (nominee) - "Yesterday's Tastes"
- 2013 - Nebula Award for Best Novella (nominee) - "Barry's Tale"
- 2013 - WSFA Small Press Award (nominee) - "Coca Xocolatl"
- 2014 - Nebula Award for Best Novella (nominee) - "Trial of the Century"
- 2015 - Nebula Award for Best Novella (nominee) - "Calendrical Regression"
- 2016 - Nebula Award for Best Novel (nominee) - Barsk: The Elephants' Graveyard
- 2016 - Kevin O'Donnell Service to SFWA Award (recipient)
- 2018 - Nebula Award for Best Novella (nominee) - Barry's Deal
- 2019 - Nebula Award for Best Novelette (nominee) - The Rule of Three
