= William Shunn =

American Science fiction author (born 1967)

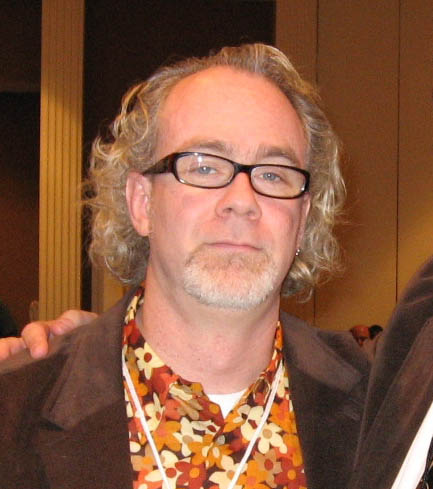
- William Shunn at the 2007 World Fantasy Convention
- Born: Donald William Shunn II; August 14, 1967 (age 59); Los Angeles, California, U.S.
- Education: University of Utah (BS)
- Occupation: Short story writer
- Writing career
- Period: 1993–present
- Genre: Science fiction
- Website: www.shunn.net

William Shunn (born August 14, 1967) is an American science fiction writer and computer programmer. He was raised in a Latter-day Saint household, the oldest of eight children. In 1986, he served a mission to Canada for the Church of Jesus Christ of Latter-day Saints, but was arrested for making a false bomb threat, for the purpose of preventing his fellow missionary from returning home.

== Life and career ==
Shunn received a B.S. in computer science at the University of Utah in 1991. He went to work for WordPerfect Corporation and was part of the team that developed WordPerfect 6.0 for MS-DOS. In 1995, he moved from Utah to New York City. He left the LDS Church at the same time and created one of the earliest ex-Mormon web sites.

Shunn's first professional short story was published in The Magazine of Fantasy & Science Fiction in 1993. He has been nominated once for the Hugo Award and twice for the Nebula Award.

Shunn is the author of a 2015 memoir, The Accidental Terrorist: Confessions of a Reluctant Missionary.

In the wake of the September 11, 2001 attacks, he created what may have been the first online survivor registry.

Shunn is also known for creating a web site, Spelling Bee Solver, that offers daily hints to The New York Times Spelling Bee. This tool is commonly used within the community of Spelling Bee players.

== Awards and nominations ==
- 2001: Nominated for Nebula Award for Best Novelette for "Dance of the Yellow-Breasted Luddites" (Vanishing Acts, ed. Ellen Datlow, Tor Books, New York, NY, 2000)
- 2006: Nominated for Hugo Award for Best Novella and Nebula Award for Best Novella for "Inclination" (Asimov's Science Fiction, April/May 2006)

== Bibliography ==
=== Fiction ===
- Netherview Station story series:
  - The Practical Ramifications of Interstellar Packet Loss (1998)
  - Dance of the Yellow-Breasted Luddites (2000)
  - Inclination (2006)
- Strong Medicine (2003)
- Love in the Age of Spyware (2003)
- An Alternate History of the 21st Century, chap-book (2007)

=== Nonfiction ===
- The Accidental Terrorist: Confessions of a Reluctant Missionary (2015)

In 1993 or 1994, Shunn wrote a style guide for standard manuscript format (the generally accepted method for preparing a fiction manuscript for submission to professional markets), based on advice gathered at the Clarion Workshop and elsewhere. First published to the web in 1995, this guide (and its later revisions), commonly known as "Shunn format", has since been adopted by many magazines including Clarkesworld, Analog, and Interzone as a requirement for submissions.
