= Nino Cipri =

American speculative fiction author

- Education: Clarion Workshop; University of Kansas (MFA)
- Occupation: Writer
- Writing career
- Language: English
- Years active: 2000–present
- Genres: Science fiction, fantasy
- Notable work: Finna
- Website: www.ninocipri.com

Nino Cipri is a science fiction writer, editor, and educator. Their works have been nominated for the Nebula, Hugo, Locus, World Fantasy, and Shirley Jackson Awards.

== Personal life ==
Cipri identifies as queer and trans/nonbinary. A graduate of the 2014 Clarion Workshop, they earned an MFA in fiction from the University of Kansas in 2019. Cipri has previously worked as a stagehand, bookseller, bike mechanic at Divvy, food columnist for a Chicago culture website, and as a labor organizer. Their partner is writer Nibedita Sen.

== Career ==
Cipri's career includes writing plays, poetry, and radio features, as well as performing as a dancer, actor, and puppeteer. Their fiction often integrates humor, critiquing late-stage capitalism and exploring themes of home, alienation, and queer identity.

Their fiction has been published in a number of magazines and publications, including Tor.com, Fireside Magazine, Nightmare Magazine, Daily Science Fiction and other places. Cipri's short story "The Shape of My Name," described as "a heart-rending vision of the struggles of time travelers bound to a single house and family," was a finalist for the 2015 James Tiptree Jr. Award and was reprinted in the Tachyon Publications anthology The New Voices of Science Fiction, edited by Hannu Rajaniemi and Jacob Weisman. Their short story "Opals and Clay" was a finalist for the 2016 Tiptree/Otherwise Award.

Their novella Finna was published in 2020 by Tor.com. It was followed by a sequel, Defekt, in 2021.

=== Inspirations ===
Cipri says Kelly Link and Ursula K. Le Guin are two of their main influences, adding about Le Guin that "I was trying to teach myself how to write short stories, she was literally the first author I turned to." They also cite the importance to their writing of queer authors from the 1990s such as Poppy Z. Brite and comics like Hothead Paisan: Homicidal Lesbian Terrorist.

Cipri attributes the layered structure of their work to Charlie Kaufman’s screenwriting style, particularly in films like Being John Malkovich and Eternal Sunshine of the Spotless Mind. These influences, alongside other queer and feminist authors from the 1990s, have helped shape their literary focus on gender, identity, and relationships. Cipri's critiques of nostalgia and apocalyptic nihilism draw inspiration from authors such as Octavia Butler, Charlie Jane Anders, Annalee Newitz.

Cipri views current social and environmental movements as major sources of inspiration and the primary reason for their dedication to speculative fiction as a genre, stressing the importance of imagination and working toward a better future. Through their writing, Cipri aims to contribute to these effort, making stories that resonate with underrepresented queer and trans experiences. Their stories frequently experiment with form and structure, as seen in Homesick. Cipri has remarked that these formats allow them to creatively explore ideas and concepts in ways traditional narrative structures may not.

Cipri's humor in Finna reflects an anti-authoritarian approach and subversion of corporate systems. Cipri’s novella Finna was inspired by their visits to IKEA, imagining the labyrinthine stores as places where “reality is thinner and apt to tear.” Cipri’s union-organizing efforts also influence their work. Their personal experiences with labor struggles and low-wage jobs defined much of the anti-capitalist sentiments in Finna.

== Awards and honors ==
Cipri's first short story collection Homesick won the Dzanc Short Fiction Collection Prize and was a finalist for the World Fantasy Award and Shirley Jackson Award. Their novella Finna became finalist for the 2021 Nebula Award for Best Novella, Hugo Award for Best Novella, and Lambda Literary Award for Transgender Fiction, and was nominated for the Locus Award for Best Novella.

Year	Nominee	Award	Category	Result	Ref.
2016	"The Shape of My Name"	Otherwise Award	—	Honor List	
2017	"Opals and Clay"	Otherwise Award	—	Honor List	
2020	Homesick	Dzanc Short Fiction Collection Prize	—	Won	
2020	Homesick	Shirley Jackson Award	Collection	Nominated	
2020	Homesick	WFA	Collection	Shortlisted	
2021	Finna	Hugo Awards	Novella	Shortlisted	
2021	Finna	Lambda Literary Award	Transgender Fiction	Shortlisted	
2021	Finna	Locus Award	Novella	Nominated—8th	
2021	Finna	Nebula Awards	Novella	Shortlisted	
2022	Defekt	Locus Award	Novella	Nominated—8th	
2022	Defekt	Philip K. Dick Award	—	Shortlisted	

== Works ==
=== Novellas ===
- —— (2020). Finna. Tor.com. ISBN 9781250245731.
- —— (2021). Defekt. Tor.com. ISBN 9781250787491.
- —— (2024). Dead Girls Don't Dream. Henry Holt and Co. ISBN 9781250791405.

=== Collections ===
- —— (2019). Homesick. Dzanc Books. ISBN 9781945814952.

=== Selected short stories ===
Year	Title	Printed	Ref
2015	"The Shape of My Name"	—— (March 4, 2015). "The Shape of My Name". Tor.com.	
2016	"Opals and Clay"	—— (February 8, 2016). "Opals and Clay". PodCastle.	
2018	"Ad Astra Per Aspera"	—— (Jan 18, 2018). "Ad Astra Per Aspera". Capricious Magazine (9).	
