= The Liar (novella) =

The Liar is a fantasy novella by American writer John P. Murphy. It was first published in The Magazine of Fantasy and Science Fiction in March 2016.

== Synopsis ==
Greg is a "Liar", who has the power to "convince" reality that what he says is true — which does not make it easier for him to investigate a string of mysterious deaths going back decades.

== Reception ==
"The Liar" was a finalist for the Nebula Award for Best Novella of 2016. Tangent Online commended Murphy for creating "interesting characters steeped in a sense of place", while Jason Sanford included it on his recommended reading list for 2016.
