= Jonathan P. Brazee =

American novelist

Jonathan Pace Brazee
- Born: February 20, 1958 (age 68); Oakland, California, USA
- Education: United States Naval Academy; U.S. International University; University of California, San Diego
- Occupation: Author
- Writing career
- Genre: Speculative fiction
- Website: www.jonathanbrazee.com

Jonathan Pace Brazee is a retired US Marine infantry colonel and author of speculative fiction, active in the field since 2010, with one story published much earlier in 1979.

== Biography ==
Brazee was born in Oakland, California.

A member of the U.S. Naval Academy Class of 1979, he also attended U.S. International University and the University of California, San Diego, earning a bachelor's, master's, and doctorate. He served in the U.S. military, retiring as a U.S. Marine infantry colonel.

He lives with his wife Kiwi and two daughters in Colorado Springs, Colorado.

He has been active in the speculative fiction field since 2010, specializing in military science fiction.

== Awards ==
Brazee is a two-time Nebula Award and two-time Dragon Award finalist, and a USA Today Bestselling writer.

"Weaponized Math" was nominated for the 2018 Nebula Award for Best Novelette. Integration was nominated for the 2018 Dragon Award for Best Military Science Fiction or Fantasy Novel. Sentenced to War was nominated for the 2021 Dragon Award for Best Military Science Fiction or Fantasy Novel. "Fire Ant" was nominated for the 2019 Nebula Award for Best Novella.
