= Finna (novella) =

2020 LGBT fantasy novella by Nino Cipri

- Cover art for "Finna" by Nino Cipri
- Author: Nino Cipri
- Language: English
- Series: LitenVerse
- Release number: 1
- Genre: Fantasy
- Publisher: Tor.com
- Publication date: 25 February 2020
- Pages: 136 (Paperback)
- ISBN: 1250245737
- Followed by: Defekt

Finna is a 2020 LGBT fantasy novella by Nino Cipri. It has been praised for its inclusion of queer characters and its criticism of capitalism and retail work. It was nominated for the 2021 Hugo Award for Best Novella, the 2021 Locus Award for Best Novella, and the 2021 Nebula Award for Best Novella. It was followed by a sequel, Defekt, in 2021.

== Plot ==
Ava works at LitenVärld, a big box retail store, with her ex Jules. One day at work, a wormhole opens in the store. A customer's grandmother, Ursula Nouri, wanders inside. Ava and Jules are sent to fetch her using a tracking device called a FINNA. They travel through numerous parallel universes. In one, they find that Mrs. Nouri has been killed by parasitic plants; the FINNA directs them to a “suitable replacement”. They meet Captain Nouresh, an alternate-universe version of Mrs. Nouri. As they fight off dangerous drones, Ava escorts Nouresh back to her world; Jules stays behind. Ava quits her job and takes the FINNA in search of Jules.

== Major themes ==
The novella criticizes the absurdities of capitalism and big box retail work. Ava and Jules are sent on a dangerous quest and offered gift cards in return. This is comparable to real-life examples in which minimum wage retail workers are mistreated by managers asking for the impossible.

Reviewer Lee Mandelo wrote that Finna's protagonists are unique in that their romantic relationship has already ended. In contrast to a common story arc in which acquaintances develop a romantic relationship, Ava's and Jules's relationship is moving from romance into friendship. The reviewer notes that this is a common experience for queer people, whose dating groups and friend groups are likely to be closely intertwined. In addition to the relationship between Jules and Ava, the novella's queer themes are explored in its discussions of labor and politics.

== Reception ==
Finna received positive critical reviews.

Writing for NPR, author Amal El-Mohtar praised the author for accurately portraying queer identities, anxiety, and depression. A review for Autostraddle criticized the work's excessive use of snark and felt that it detracted from its criticism of capitalism. Despite this, the same reviewer found that Cipri's "overarching points about capitalism’s dehumanizing effects are well-taken" and found the novella "an engaging and lively read".

== Awards ==
Year	Award	Category	Result	Ref.
2021	Hugo Awards	Novella	Shortlisted	
2021	Lambda Literary Award	Transgender Fiction	Shortlisted	
2021	Locus Award	Novella	Nominated—8th	
2021	Nebula Awards	Novella	Shortlisted	
