= Giora Leshem =

Giora Leshem (born Moshe Giora Rotstein, Hebrew: גיורא לשם; February 3, 1940– March 14, 2011) was an Israeli poet and translator and one of the founders of the Keshev poetry publishing house. At the time of his death, Keshev was the largest independent book publisher in Israel. Leshem has two half siblings named Dorit and Yoram Leshem.

== Education and experience ==
Leshem was born in Tel Aviv, British Mandate Palestine. He studied chemistry and biology at Bar-Ilan University, and then statistics and physics at Columbia University in New York. In addition, he studied computer operating systems at IBM. He taught at the Kfar Silver Youth Village and also at the Ort Educational Institute. He also participated in the development of medical software applications. He was a proofreader for the Davar newspaper and an editor and translator for the Al HaMishmar newspaper.

== Literary career ==
Leshem has published five books of poetry (the latest of which, הנה ימים באים, Behold, The Days Are Coming was published by Keshev in 2007) and two books connected with the subjects of literature and poetry. He has also translated many books of poetry, prose and analysis, including William Blake's The Marriage of Heaven and Hell, which he translated twice, in 1968 for the Eked Publishing House and 30 years later for Keshev. In 1989, he edited the Rav Kol anthology, which was published with the assistance of the Israeli Authors Associations. In 1992, together with Moshe Dor and Barbara Goldberg, he was the editor of an anthology of Israeli poetry that was translated to English and published under the title, The Stones Remember, which won the Witter Bynner Foundation Award in the United States and was selected by Choice magazine as an "Outstanding Academic Book" in 1993.

In 1997, Leshem was one of the founders of the Keshev Poetry Publishing House, together with poets Raffi Weichart and Moshe Dor. The publishing house focuses on quality original and translated poetry. Leshem stopped his activities in the publishing house in 2008. In addition, Leshem was general secretary of the Hebrew Authors Association from 1986 to 1987 and won a variety of awards for his creations, among which are the Bernstein Prize (original Hebrew-language poetry category) (3 times), the ACUM Prize for poetry (twice), the Golden Feather Award, and the Prime Minister's Award in 1985 and in 2003.
