= Charles Coleman Finlay =

American writer and editor (born 1964)

- Born: July 1, 1964 (age 62); New York City, U.S.
- Education: Ohio State University
- Occupations: Author; editor
- Spouse: Rae Carson
- Writing career
- Genres: Science fiction; fantasy
- Website: www.ccfinlay.com

Charles Coleman Finlay (born July 1, 1964 in New York City, NY) is an American science fiction and fantasy author and editor.

He grew up in Marysville, Ohio and attended Ohio State University. His first story, Footnotes, was published in 2001 in The Magazine of Fantasy & Science Fiction (F&SF) where many of his stories have since been published.

He has published four novels and a short story collection. His fiction has been nominated for the Hugo Award for Best Novella, the Nebula Award for Best Novella, and the Sidewise Award, and in 2003 he was a finalist for the John W. Campbell Award for Best New Writer. He also wrote chapters for the "hoax-novel" Atlanta Nights.

Finlay guest edited the July/August 2014 issue of F&SF. In January 2015, Finlay was named the 9th editor of F&SF and served in that role until the January/February 2021 issue. In 2021, he won a World Fantasy Award for his work editing the magazine.

== Personal life ==
He is married to the fantasy writer Rae Carson.

== Awards ==
- 2021, World Fantasy Award for Special Award, Professional for editing F&SF

== Bibliography ==
=== Novels ===
- The Prodigal Troll (Pyr, 2005)
- Traitor to the Crown Book 1: The Patriot Witch as C. C. Finlay (Del Rey, 2009)
- Traitor to the Crown Book 2: A Spell for the Revolution as C. C. Finlay (Del Rey, 2009)
- Traitor to the Crown Book 3: The Demon Redcoat as C. C. Finlay (Del Rey, 2009)

==== In translation ====
- Der verlorene Troll (2007), ISBN 3-608-93786-2
- Prigioniero politico (2010), ISBN 88-95724-97-6

=== Collections ===
- Wild Things (Subterranean, 2005)

=== Short fiction ===
Stories
Title	Year	First published	Reprinted/collected	Notes
The political prisoner	2008	F&SF		Nebula Award finalist for Best Novella, 2009; Hugo Award finalist for Best Novella, 2009; Theodore Sturgeon Award finalist, 2009
The Texas Bake Sale	2009	"The Texas Bake Sale" F&SF 116/2 (Feb 2009)		
The empathy vaccine	2015	Finlay, C. C. (June 2015). "The empathy vaccine". Analog Science Fiction and Fact. 135 (6): 60–64.		

- "Pervert" 2005 Gaylactic Spectrum Award finalist (short form)
- "We Come Not to Praise Washington" 2002 Sidewise Award finalist (short form)
- "The Political Officer", finalist for Best Novella of 2002, and 2003 Hugo Award finalist for Best Novella

=== Editorials ===
- "[Untitled]". F&SF. 139 (1&2): 6–10. July–August 2020. Archived from the original on July 18, 2020.

=== Interviews ===
- Finlay, Charles Coleman (January 2010). "The crucible". Locus (588): 64–66.

== See ==
- List of fantasy authors
