= Survivor registry =

List of survivors of a disaster

A survivor registry is a database or list of individuals who have survived a particular event or situation, such as a natural disaster, a disease outbreak, or a war. The purpose of a survivor registry is to identify and track individuals who have survived the event and to provide information about their status, whereabouts and needs. Individuals, organizations and agencies use survivor registries to provide support and assistance to survivors, to reunite families and acquaintances re-establish contact after they have been separated by the disruption caused by the disaster, and to track and respond to any long-term needs or effects of the event.

Examples of survivor registries include those compiled after a natural disaster such as an earthquake, hurricane, or flood, of individuals who have survived and have been located and accounted for; lists of individuals who have survived an infectious disease outbreak, such as the Ebola virus, and have been cleared of the infection; war survivor registries, including Holocaust survivor registries, listing individuals who have survived a war or genocide and have been verified as alive and registries following mass attacks such the 9/11 survivor registry listing individuals who survived the September 11, 2001 terrorist attacks on the World Trade Center in New York City and have been accounted for.

== Holocaust ==
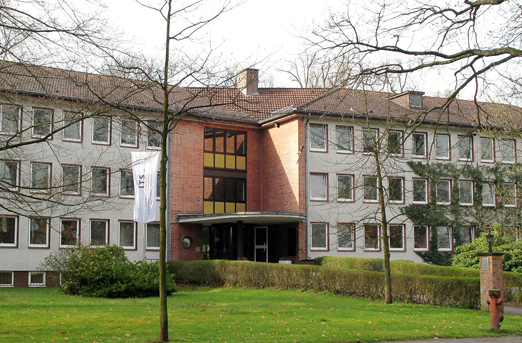
The Arolsen Archives-International Center on Nazi Persecution in Bad Arolsen, Germany, a repository of information on victims of Nazi persecution, including survivors.

There are several databases of survivors of the Nazi genocide of Jewish people during World War II.

One of the most well-known and comprehensive archives of Holocaust-era records, including lists of survivors, is the Arolsen Archives-International Center on Nazi Persecution founded by the Allies in 1948 as the International Tracing Service (ITS). For decades after the war, in response to inquiries, the main tasks of ITS were determining the fates of victims of Nazi persecution and searching for missing people.

The Benjamin and Vladka Meed Registry of Holocaust Survivors, created in 1981 by the American Gathering of Jewish Holocaust Survivors to document the experiences of survivors and assist survivors and their families trying to trace missing relatives and friends, includes over 200,000 records related to survivors and their families from around the world. It is now part of the United States Holocaust Memorial Museum.

The Holocaust Global Registry is an online collection of databases maintained by the Jewish genealogical website JewishGen, an affiliate of the Museum of Jewish Heritage – A Living Memorial to the Holocaust; it contains thousands of names of both survivors trying to find family and family searching for survivors.

The Holocaust Survivors and Victims Database, maintained by the United States Holocaust Memorial Museum, contains millions of names of people persecuted under the Nazi regime, including concentration camp or displaced persons camp lists that can be searched by place name or keywords.

The Holocaust Survivor Children: Missing Identity website addresses the issue of child survivors still hoping to find relatives or people who can tell them about their parents and family, and others who hope to find out basic information about themselves such as their original names, dates and place of birth, and parents’ names, based on a photograph of themselves as a child.

== Red Cross ==
The Red Cross established a register of survivors of the SS Noronic disaster in 1949. Survivors of the Hurricane Katrina disaster also registered with the Red Cross to help notify their friends and family.

== World Trade Center ==
Following the destruction of the World Trade Center, many telephone lines and transmission facilities were disrupted. Computer programmer and science fiction writer William Shunn was in Queens nearby. At about 11:30 a.m. on September 11, in response to a friend's emailed suggestion that he maintain and circulate a list of acquaintances he had heard from, Shunn posted the names of people he knew were okay on his personal web site and began sending the URL to other friends. Keeping the list up-to-date proved difficult, as more emails flooded in than he could handle. He quickly developed a simple database and form submission system so that visitors to the site could post their own names to the list. This automated system debuted at around 1:00 p.m. that afternoon.

Meanwhile, a crew of programmers at the University of California, Berkeley with vastly superior resources were working on a similar concept. Their survivor registry went online at about 3:00 p.m. Eastern time. While Shunn's site foundered and eventually crashed under the heavy load of submissions, the Berkeley site ran on a large computer cluster, and for the next several days stood out as the most robust and accurate of the many survivor registries that followed.

One problem that plagued the survivor registries was that of inaccurate information. Many entries listed actual victims as being okay that Berkeley eventually implemented a system that used cross-checks to gauge the accuracy of the information received.

The grassroots generation of survivor registries led many people to wonder why the federal government did not have such a system already in place. Federal Emergency Management Agency (FEMA) has since discussed plans for official survivor registries in the future.

The National September 11 Memorial & Museum maintains a Witness and Survivors Registry to document survivors of the attack.
