= Get to Know You =

Get to Know You may refer to:

- "Get to Know You", a song by Baboon from Ed Lobster
- Get to Know You, an extended play by Jai Waetford
- "Like to Get to Know You", a song by Spanky and Our Gang
  - Like to Get to Know You (album), its parent album
- "Wanna Get to Know You", a song by G-Unit from the album Beg for Mercy

== See also ==
- Getting to Know You (disambiguation)
