= The Political Officer =

"The Political Officer" is a science fiction novella by Charles Coleman Finlay. It was first published in The Magazine of Fantasy & Science Fiction, in April 2002.

== Synopsis ==
Maxim Nikomedes is a political officer who must not only locate a traitor on the crew of a spaceship, but also identify his own attempted assassin.

== Reception ==
"The Political Officer" was a finalist for the Nebula Award for Best Novella of 2002, and for the 2003 Hugo Award for Best Novella.

Steven H. Silver praised its "carefully thought out and interesting setting with plenty of indication of an actual history behind it" and its "intelligent and riveting" narrative, while John Joseph Adams stated that its presence would make a collection "worth buying for that story alone."

== Origin ==
"The Political Officer" is a rewritten version of "Negri's Boys", a fanfic of Lois McMaster Bujold's Vorkosigan Saga.
