= Counting Heads =

2005 novel by David Marusek

- First edition
- Author: David Marusek
- Cover artist: Chris Moore
- Language: English
- Genre: Science fiction
- Publisher: Tor Books
- Publication date: 2005
- Publication place: United States
- Media type: Print (Hardcover)
- Pages: 336
- ISBN: 0-7653-1267-0
- OCLC: 58043015
- Dewey Decimal: 813/.6 22
- LC Class: PS3613.A788 C68 2005
- Followed by: Mind Over Ship

Counting Heads is a science fiction novel by American writer David Marusek, published in 2005 by Tor Books.

Counting Heads is an expansion of Marusek's 1995 short story "We Were Out of Our Minds with Joy", which serves as the first chapter of Counting Heads (with minor revisions from its original rendition as a short story).

Mind Over Ship, a sequel to Counting Heads, was released on January 20, 2009.

== Analysis ==
The extended story from We Were Out of Our Minds with Joy, happening in 2092-4, occupies the first part of the novel. The other two parts are set 40 years later, in 2134.

Though the novel is a murder/espionage mystery, the main thrust is the evocation of a world in which the individual is essentially obsolete due to automation.
