= Nan Fry =

American writer

Nan Mallet Fry (August 6, 1945 – September 23, 2016) was an American poet and essayist, known for her award winning book of poetry, Relearning the Dark. She received an EdPress Award for excellence in educational journalism, and an Individual Artist’s Award from the Maryland State Arts Council.

== Personal life ==
Fry was born in Kansas City, Missouri and grew up in West Hartford, Connecticut. She earned a B.A. in English at Wells College, followed by an M.A. in Medieval Studies and a PhD in English at Yale University before settling in the greater DC area. After teaching periodically at American University and the University of Maryland, she joined the full-time faculty in the Academic Studies Program at the Corcoran College of Art & Design in 1983, and remained there until her retirement in 2005. Starting in 1980, she also taught many workshops at the Writer's Center of Bethesda. For over ten years, she coordinated a poetry reading series at Westmoreland Church in Bethesda, Maryland.

== Career ==
Fry authored an award-winning book of poetry, Relearning the Dark (Washington Writers Publishing House, 1991) and a chapbook of riddle poems translated from Anglo-Saxon, Say What I Am Called (Sibyl-Child, 1988). Individual poems of hers were published in such journals as Beltway Poetry Quarterly, Innisfree Poetry Journal, Negative Capability, Plainsong, The Wallace Stevens Journal, and The Journal of Mythic Arts, and she was featured on a “Poet and the Poem from the Library of Congress” audio podcast.

Her poems appeared on posters in the transit systems of DC, Baltimore, and Ft. Collins, Colorado as part of the Poetry Society of America’s “Poetry in Motion” Program, on a Bethesda Poetry Bench Project, and in numerous anthologies, including Cabin Fever: Poets at Joaquin Miller’s Cabin, Poetry in Motion from Coast to Coast, The Beastly Bride, The Year’s Best Fantasy and Horror, The Faery Reel, Rye Bread: Women Poets Rising, Hungry As We Are: An Anthology of Washington Area Poets, and The Poet’s Cookbook: Recipes from Germany.

She contributed essays on writing and teaching poetry, such as "Writing Riddle poems: Secrets Meant to be Shared." The essay "Anglo-Saxon Latitudes" was published in Poet Lore.

She also wrote occasional fiction; a story of hers was included in the anthology Gravity Dancers. In addition, her work was republished in textbooks, including The Creative Process and Discovering Literature.
