= Writer's Center =

Independent literary center in the district of Bethesda, Maryland, United States

Coordinates: 38°58′45″N 77°05′27.5″W

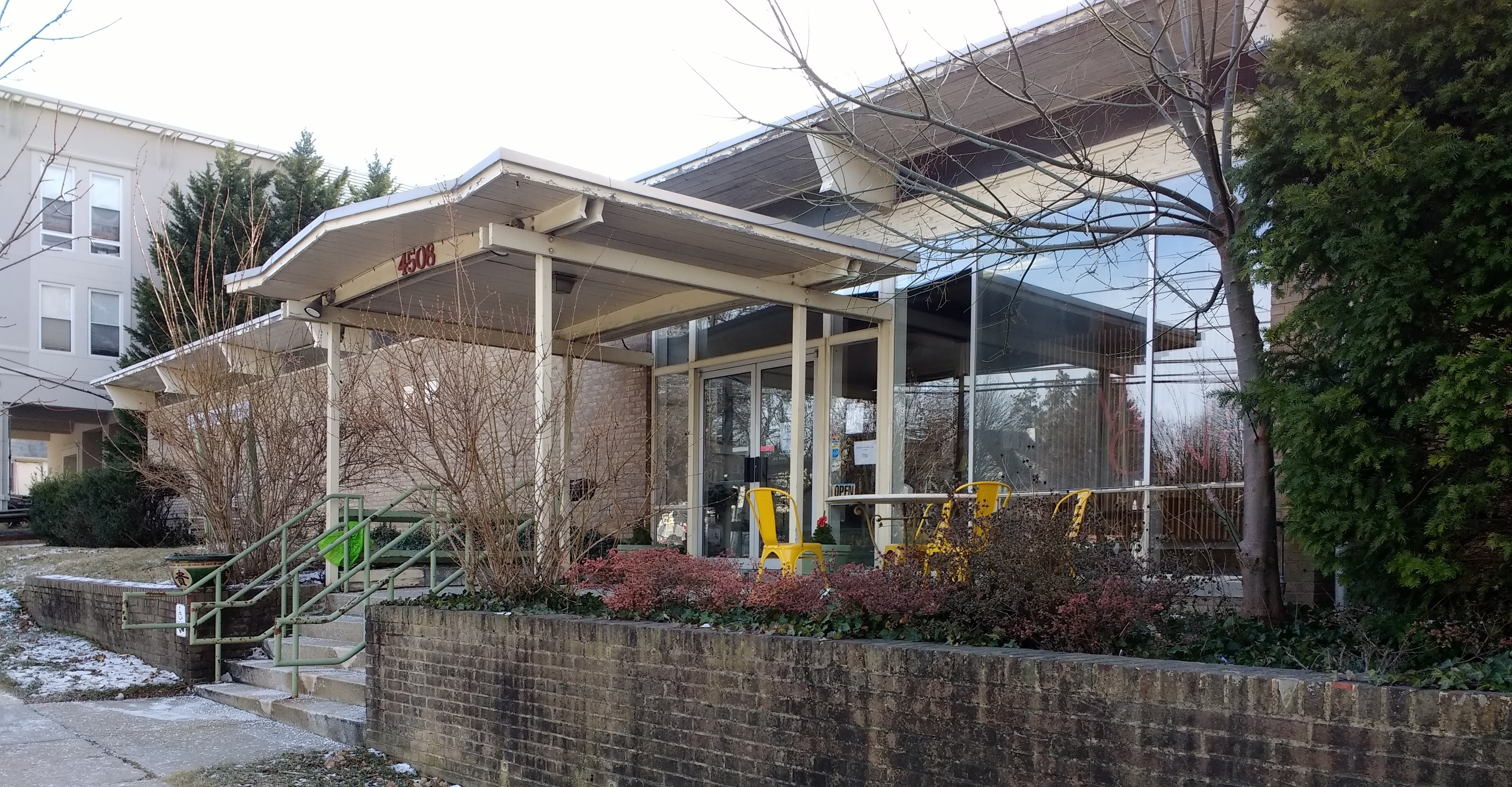
- Headquarters in Bethesda, Maryland
- Formation: 1976; 50 years ago
- Legal status: 501(c)(3) nonprofit organization
- Location: Bethesda, Maryland, USA

The Writer's Center, founded in 1976, is an independent literary center headquartered in Bethesda, Maryland. The organization consists of about 2,500 writers, editors, small-press publishers, and other artists who support each other in the creation and marketing of literary texts.

The Writer's Center hosts readings, literary events, and conferences; and offers an environment for writing groups to meet. It conducts hundreds of workshops a year, in various genres of writing, for participants who share their works-in-progress under the guidance of an experienced instructor who is also a published author. It also sells books and literary magazines.

Its 12,200-square-foot (1,130 m2) headquarters is located in Bethesda; it also conducts events in Leesburg, Virginia; Arlington, Virginia; and at other locations around the greater Washington, D.C. metropolitan area.

The Writer's Center publishes Poet Lore, the longest continuously running poetry journal in the United States. Materials from the center's history—issues of Poet Lore and of the center's quarterly magazine The Carousel, workshop brochures, and more—are maintained in the Special Collections Research Center of the Estelle and Melvin Gelman Library at the George Washington University.

A 501(c)(3) nonprofit organization, the center is supported in part by The Arts and Humanities Council of Montgomery County, Maryland, and by grants from the Maryland State Arts Council, the National Endowment for the Arts, and other organizations.

== Notable instructors ==
- Sandra Beasley
- Richard Blanco
- Brenda Clough
- Nan Fry
- Barbara Goldberg
- Lee Gutkind
- Rod Jellema
- Stanley Plumly
