= Dance of the Yellow-Breasted Luddites =

2000 science fiction novelette by William Shunn

- Author: William Shunn
- Language: English
- Genre: Science fiction
- Publisher: Tor Books
- Publication date: 2000
- Preceded by: The Practical Ramifications of Interstellar Packet Loss
- Followed by: Inclination

"Dance of the Yellow-Breasted Luddites" is a science fiction novelette by William Shunn. It appeared in the original anthology Vanishing Acts, edited by Ellen Datlow and published by Tor Books in 2000. It was nominated for the 2001 Nebula Award for Best Novelette.

== Plot ==
The story takes place in a wildlife reserve on a mostly barren planet named Sutter's Mill. Rescue Star operative Hannah Specter is overseeing the introduction of a new alien animal species into the reserve and must unravel the mystery of the species' seemingly suicidal behavior.

== Netherview Station series ==
"Dance of the Yellow-Breasted Luddites" is part of Shunn's "Netherview Station" story series, which also includes "The Practical Ramifications of Interstellar Packet Loss" and "Inclination."
