= David Marusek =

American author (born 1951)

- Born: January 21, 1951 (age 75); Buffalo, New York, U.S.
- Education: Clarion West Writers Workshop
- Occupation: Author
- Children: 1
- Website: www.marusek.com

David Marusek (born January 21, 1951, in Buffalo, New York) is an American author.

== Biography ==
Marusek worked as a graphic designer for about twenty years and for eleven years he also taught graphic design at the University of Alaska Fairbanks. He became serious about a writing career around 1986; success began soon after he attended Clarion West Workshop in 1992. His third published story, "We Were Out of Our Minds with Joy," garnered attention. In 1999 his novella "The Wedding Album" won the Theodore Sturgeon Award and was nominated for the Nebula Award for Best Novella. His first novel, Counting Heads (a much bigger expansion of "...Joy"), was published by Tor Books in 2005, and was the subject of Dave Itzkoff's debut "Across the Universe" column in the March 5, 2006 The New York Times.

A second novel titled Mind Over Ship (a sequel to Counting Heads) was released by Tor Books on January 20, 2009. A short story collection, Getting to Know You, was published by Subterranean Press in 2007 and was reprinted by Del Rey Books in 2008.

A new novel titled Upon This Rock: Book 1--First Contact (Volume 1) was released on June 29, 2017, followed by two more volumes: Upon this Rock: Book 2--Glassing the Orgachine on February 2, 2019, and Upon this Rock: Book 3--Consider Pipnonia on June 18, 2021.

== Personal life ==
Marusek lived in various places in youth. He is divorced. He has a daughter. He has lived in Alaska since 1973 and that is the state he is most associated with.

== Works ==
=== Short fiction ===
- "The Earth Is on the Mend" (1993)
- "She Was Good--She Was Funny" (1994)
- "We Were Out of Our Minds with Joy" (1995)
- "Getting to Know You" (1998)
- "Yurek Rutz, Yurek Rutz, Yurek Rutz" (1999)
- "Cabbages and Kales, or, How We Downsized North America" (1999)
- "The Wedding Album" (1999)
- "VTV" (2000)
- "A Bog in Cathyland" (2001)
- "Listen to Me" (2003)
- "My Morning Glory"(2006)
- "HealthGuard" (2007)
- "Osama Phone Home"(2007)

=== Novels ===
==== Counting Heads ====
- Counting Heads (2005)
- Mind Over Ship (2009)

==== Upon This Rock ====
- First Contact (2017)
- Glassing the Orgachine (2019)
- Consider Pipnonia (2021)
- Our Townish (2024)

=== Collections ===
- Getting to Know You (2007)
