= Unsound Variations =

1982 novella by George R. R. Martin

"Unsound Variations" is a 1982 science fiction short story by George R. R. Martin, about chess. It was first published in Amazing Stories.

== Synopsis ==
Bruce Bunnish has invented a machine to send his consciousness back in time to the body of his younger self, and uses it to torment the members of his college chess team and obsessively replay games he lost decades ago.

== Reception ==
"Unsound Variations" was a finalist for the Nebula Award for Best Novella in 1982, and for the 1983 Hugo Award for Best Novella
