= Bud Sparhawk =

American science fiction writer

- Born: John C. Sparhawk; August 11, 1937 (age 89); Baltimore, Maryland, U.S.
- Education: University of Maryland, College Park (BS); Oklahoma City University (MBA)
- Writing career
- Language: English
- Genre: Science fiction

John C. "Bud" Sparhawk (born August 11, 1937) is an American science fiction writer. He writes humorous science fiction, in particular the Sam Boone series of short fiction.

== Biography ==
Sparhawk was born in Baltimore, Maryland, and lives in Annapolis. He has a BS degree in Mathematics from the University of Maryland and an MBA in Finance from Oklahoma City University. After fifteen years in the Air Force he worked for a variety of commercial companies before retiring from the role of Vice President at Macfadden, a federal government contractor. Sparhawk is also a member of SIGMA, a think tank of speculative writers that advises the government on issues of national interest.

Sparhawk started writing seriously in 1974 and made his first sale to Analog, followed quickly by his second, just when he entered his second year of graduate school, and just before taking a thirteen-year hiatus from SF. His work is most associated with his short fiction in Analog but it has also appeared in various other magazines and anthologies. He is a three-time nominee for the Nebula Award for Best Novella, in 1997, 2002, and 2005, and his stories have appeared in several Year's Best SF anthologies. His first professionally published novel, titled Vixen, was released in 2008 from Cosmos Books. At the 2017 Nebula Awards Sparhawk received the Kevin O'Donnell, Jr. Award for service to the Science Fiction and Fantasy Writers of America (SFWA), and in 2018 he retired from the SFWA Board of Directors as Chief Financial Officer.

Sparhawk occasionally attends science fiction and fantasy conventions, including Balticon, Confluence, and CapClave in the Mid-Atlantic region of the US. He has also appeared as a guest author in numerous interviews. When not writing, he spends his spare time sailing on Chesapeake Bay.

== Bibliography ==
=== Novels ===
- Vixen. New York: Cosmos Books. 2008.
- Distant Seas. Brooklyn, N.Y.: Fantastic Books. 2015.
- Dreams of Earth. New York: Mystique Press. 2018.
- Shattered Dreams. Pennsville, NJ: eSpec Books. 2018.

=== Short fiction ===
Title	Year	First published	Reprinted/collected	Notes
Bright red star	2005	Sparhawk, Bud (March 2005). "Bright Red Star". Asimov's Science Fiction.		
Scout	2012	Sparhawk, Bud (June 2012). "Scout". Asimov's Science Fiction. Vol. 36, no. 6.		
Deceleration	2013	Sparhawk, Bud (November 2013). "Deceleration". Analog Science Fiction and Fact. Vol. 133, no. 11. pp. 39–43.		
Forgiveness	2014	Sparhawk, Bud (June 2014). "Forgiveness". Analog Science Fiction and Fact. Vol. 134, no. 6. pp. 72–79.		
Conquest	2014	Sparhawk, Bud (November 2014). "Conquest". Analog Science Fiction and Fact. Vol. 134, no. 11. pp. 56–60.		
Slider	2015	Sparhawk, Bud (May 2015). "Slider". Analog Science Fiction and Fact. Vol. 135, no. 5. pp. 48–57.		Novelette
Delivery	2015	Sparhawk, Bud (July–August 2015). "Delivery". Analog Science Fiction and Fact. Vol. 135, no. 7&8. pp. 144–145.		
Mulligan	2019	Sparhawk, Bud (May–June 2019). "Mulligan". Analog Science Fiction and Fact.		

Analog

- The Invitation (March–April 2019)
- The Fading Pages of a Short Story (January–February 2019)
- Downsized(November/December 2017)
- Heaven's Covenant (September 2017)
- The Return (May/June 2017)
- Footprints in the Snow (November 2015)
- Forgiveness (June 2014)
- CREP d'Etoile (July/August 2013)
- The Snack (March 2013)
- The Old Man's Best (May 2011)
- Astronomical Distance, Geologic Time (March 2011)
- Encounter in a Yellow Wood (March 2010)
- The Late Sam Boone (June 2008)
- The Suit (November 2007)
- Chandra's Pup (July/August 2005)
- Clay's Pride (July/August 2004) – Nebula Award finalist
- Sam Boone's Super Fantastic, Intragalactic, Ass-Kicking, Body-Slammin', Foot Stomping, Rasslin' Extravaganza (May 2002)
- Magic's Price (March 2001) – Nebula Award finalist
- The Debt (May 2000)
- The Emperor's Dark Matters (July/August 2000)
- Evolution (October 2000)
- Olympus Mons (February 1998)
- The Ice Dragon's Song (July/August 1998)
- Sam Boone's Teacup Conundrum (August 1998)
- High Flight (December 1998)
- Sam Boone's Dry Run (July 1997)
- Primrose Rescue (May 1997)
- Sam Boone's Rational Choice (March 1997)
- Sam Boone's Appeal to Common Scents (July 1996)
- Primrose and Thorn (May 1996) – Anlab Award winner (Analog reader's poll), Nebula finalist; in Years' Best Science Fiction, number 14
- The Bill (February 1996)
- Resurrection (January 1996)
- Sam Boone and the Thermal Couples (October 1995)
- Persistence (May 1994)
- Iridium Dreams (April 1994)
- Jake's Gift (September 1993)
- R-TRNRD (Mid-December 1993)
- Dad (June 1993)
- Childish Things (December 1994)
- Hurricane! (September 1994)
- Mary's Present (July 1994)
- Alba Krystal (January 1977)
- The Tompkins Battery Case (August 1976)

Other magazines

- Dog Tales ("Amazing Stories", Fall 2019 Year Two Special Edition)
- Comrades in Arms ("Intergalactic Medicine Show", June 2018)
- Yesterday's Solutions ("http://seat14c.com/future_ideas/20H", August 8, 2017)
- Haunted (w/Cat Rambo)("Apex & Abyss", July 2016)
- Causes and Effects (Daily Science Fiction, July 2016)
- High Jack ("Trajectories", Hydra Publications, April 2016)
- Culmination (Daily Science Fiction, September 2015)
- Tommy and the Beast (Daily Science Fiction, December 20, 2013)
- Ten Winks to Forever (Orson Scott Card's Intergalactic Medicine Show, June 2010)
- Tortuous Path (Abyss and Apex, April 2010)
- No Cord Nor Cable (Abyss and Apex, April 2009)
- Winds of Mars (Jim Baen's Universe, April 2009)
- Pumpkin Jim Baen's Universe, January 2009)
- The Super (Jim Baen's Universe, August 2008)
- Connection (Darker Matter, June 2007)
- Frost (Darker Matter, March 2007)
- An Affliction of Wyrms (iFiction, February 2006)
- Bright Red Star (Asimov's August 2004) – in Year's Best Science Fiction, number 11
- Handful of Stars (Frequency *5, Fall 2003)
- Rate of Change (Frequency, *2, January 2001)
- Mercenary (Absolute Magnitude, Summer, 1998)
- Beryl's Run (Absolute Magnitude, Winter 1999)
- Etiquette (Radius, April 1995)
- Rate of Change (Radius, November 1995)
- Eve of Feast (Radius, December 1994)
- Culmination (Daily SF, July 2015)

=== Short fiction in anthologies ===
- Pilgrim (Fantastic Future 13, February 2013)
- True Friends (Dogs of War, April 2013)
- Hard Choices (Best Laid Plans, December 2012)
- Cybermarine (Defending the Future, December 2013)
- The Glass Box (So It Begins, March 2009)
- Broadside (Breach the Hull, November 2007)
- Alliances (Breach the Hull, November 2007)
- Dancing with Dragons (Wildside Press), collection
- Sam Boone – Front to Back (FoxAcre Press), collection of the Sam Boone stories
- Bright Red Star (Year's Best SF, Number 11, 2004)
- Seduction (Through a Glass Darkly, Lite Circle Books, 2003)
- Pumpkin (Dancing with Dragons, Wildside Press)
- Fierce Embrace (Return of the Dinosaurs, DAW Books,1997)

=== Electronic books ===
- Distant Seas (eNovel)
- Stone in the Glade (eNovel) (As J Carroll)
- Two Novellas (eCollection)
- Three from the Dark Side (eCollection)
- Mars & Beyond (eCollection)
- Magician (eNovel)
- Evolution (eCollection)
- Boy's Book of Science (eNovel)
- Short Subjects (eCollection)

=== Nonfiction ===
- Premature Submission Syndrome (The SFWA Bulletin Summer 2015)
- The Eleven Stages of Publication (The SFWA Bulletin Summer 2014)
- Writing Tools (Clarkesworld Magazine #92)
- From the Treasurer(The SFWA Bulletin, Winter 2014)
- Taxes and the Short Fiction Writer (The SFWA Bulletin, Winter 2013)
- Laugh Lines (How to Write Science Fiction, Dragon Moon Press, 2007)
- Your Literary Legacy (The SFWA Bulletin, Winter 2006)
- Cold Trophies (Artemis, Fall 2003)
- Ms Management (Speculations 21, June 1999)
- Love's Labor. Lost! (Speculations 20, April 1998)
- The Last Great Man (Speculations, March 1995)
- The Hat and the Dragon (Chesapeake Bay Magazine, October 1992)
- Hugo and Me (Chesapeake Bay Magazine, April 1992)

=== Critical studies and reviews of Sparhawk's work ===
Distant Seas

- Sakers, Don (September 2015). "The Reference Library". Analog Science Fiction and Fact. 135 (9): 105–108.
