= The Moment (story) =

Short story by Lawrence M. Schoen

"The Moment" is a 2009 science fiction short story by Lawrence M. Schoen. It was first published in the Hadley Rille Books anthology Footprints.

== Synopsis ==
At multiple points throughout the distant future, various groups of aliens examine the footprint left by a member of a long-extinct species during the first Moon landing.

== Reception ==
"The Moment" was a finalist for the 2010 Hugo Award for Best Short Story.

At Tor.com, John Klima noted that "some of the vignettes (were) extremely difficult to get through", but overall commended Schoen for "how (he) pulled the whole story together", and observed that the story "hits a number of classic science fiction notes".
