= The Year's Best Science Fiction: Nineteenth Annual Collection =

2002 anthology edited by Gardner Dozois

- Editor: Gardner Dozois
- Language: English
- Series: The Year's Best Science Fiction
- Genre: Science fiction
- Publisher: St. Martin's Press
- Publication date: 2002
- Publication place: United States
- Media type: Print (hardcover & trade paperback)
- Pages: 637 pp
- ISBN: 9780312288792
- Preceded by: The Year's Best Science Fiction: Eighteenth Annual Collection
- Followed by: The Year's Best Science Fiction: Twentieth Annual Collection

The Year's Best Science Fiction: Nineteenth Annual Collection is a science fiction anthology edited by Gardner Dozois that was published in 2002. It is the 19th in The Year's Best Science Fiction series. It received the Locus Award for best anthology in 2003.

== Contents ==
The book includes a 34-page summation by Dozois; 26 stories, all that first appeared in 2001, and each with a two-paragraph introduction by Dozois; and a seven-page referenced list of honorable mentions for the year. The stories are as follows.

- Ian R. MacLeod: "New Light On the Drake Equation"
- Michael Cassutt: "More Adventures On Other Planets"
- Dan Simmons: "On K2 With Kanakaredes"
- William Sanders: "When This World Is All On Fire"
- Nancy Kress: "Computer Virus"
- Geoff Ryman: "Have Not Have"
- Charles Stross: "Lobsters"
- Michael Swanwick: "The Dog Said Bow-Wow"
- Andy Duncan: "The Chief Designer"
- Paul Di Filippo: "Neutrino Drag"
- Alastair Reynolds: "Glacial"
- Allen M. Steele: "The Days Between"
- Howard Waldrop and Leigh Kennedy: "One-Horse Town"
- Eleanor Arnason: "Moby Quilt"
- Robert Reed: "Raven Dream"
- James Patrick Kelly: "Undone"
- Carolyn Ives Gilman: "The Real Thing"
- Maureen F. McHugh: "Interview: On Any Given Day"
- Ian R. MacLeod: "Isabel Of the Fall"
- Jim Grimsley: "Into Greenwood"
- Michael Blumlein: "Know How, Can Do"
- Simon Ings: "Russian Vine"
- Paul McAuley: "The Two Dicks"
- Brenda W. Clough: "May Be Some Time"
- Chris Beckett: "Marcher"
- Ken MacLeod: "The Human Front"
