= Getting to Know You (short story) =

1997 novelette by David Marusek

"Getting to Know You" is a science fiction short story by American writer David Marusek, published in the March 1998 issue of Isaac Asimov's Science Fiction Magazine, after appearing in a privately circulated anthology prepared by Nokia in 1997. This story is also included in Marusek's 2007 short story collection Getting To Know You.

== Plot summary ==
Set the same future (the "Boutique Economy") as Marusek's We Were Out of Our Minds with Joy, the story is about Zoranna – an affluent, attractive journalist who visits her elderly sister Nancy, who is the only other surviving member of her family. Unlicensed procreation has been outlawed to prevent overpopulation; biotechnology has advanced to the point where immortality is possible, but only granted to people who have the means and are considered useful to society. Nancy is one of the people who are considered obsolete, as she was forced out of her teaching career after the Procreation Ban; she now works as a hospice caretaker from her apartment, where she tends to holographic projections of dying patients.

A subplot of the story involves Zoranna's "belt valet", an artificially intelligent accessory that can mentally communicate with its wearer and perform a wide variety of tasks. A representative of the company that gave her the belt valet (which she names "Bug") to field test urges that she return it, due to an unspecified defect; she refuses in spite of her annoyance with it, as she needs it for progressively more tasks.

When she finally visits Nancy, Zoranna finds out that she is living with a man who is using her as a fall guy for a fraud. She forces the man to leave under threat of turning him in, a loss which causes Nancy's condition to deteriorate. Zoranna's attempts to get Nancy to go to a rejuvenation clinic at her expense are rebuffed, until Bug – having unexpectedly changed into a suave, powerful entity named Nicholas that knows every aspect of her life and personality – tricks Nancy into taking Zoranna to the clinic by making it appear as if she were gravely ill. Angered at first, Zoranna at last comes to terms with the machine.

Zoranna and Nicholas are also minor characters in Marusek's first novel, Counting Heads, while Zoranna herself is mentioned in obliquely in "We Were Out of Our Minds With Joy".

== Sources ==
- Dozois, Gardner, and Sheila Williams. Isaac Asimov's Utopias. (New York: Ace Books, 2000), pp. 62–96.
