= Inclination (novella) =

Science fiction novella

"Inclination" is a science fiction novella by American writer William Shunn. It appeared in the April/May 2006 issue of Asimov's Science Fiction. It was nominated for both the Hugo and Nebula awards in 2007.

The story concerns a young stevedore named Jude who lives on a giant space station in the far future. Jude belongs to a small religious sect that eschews advanced technology, a belief that comes into conflict with practicality when advancement at work depends on biomodifications.

"Inclination" is part of Shunn's "Netherview Station" story series, which also includes "The Practical Ramifications of Interstellar Packet Loss" and "Dance of the Yellow-Breasted Luddites."

The text is available online at Asimov's.
