= Barbara Goldberg =

American author

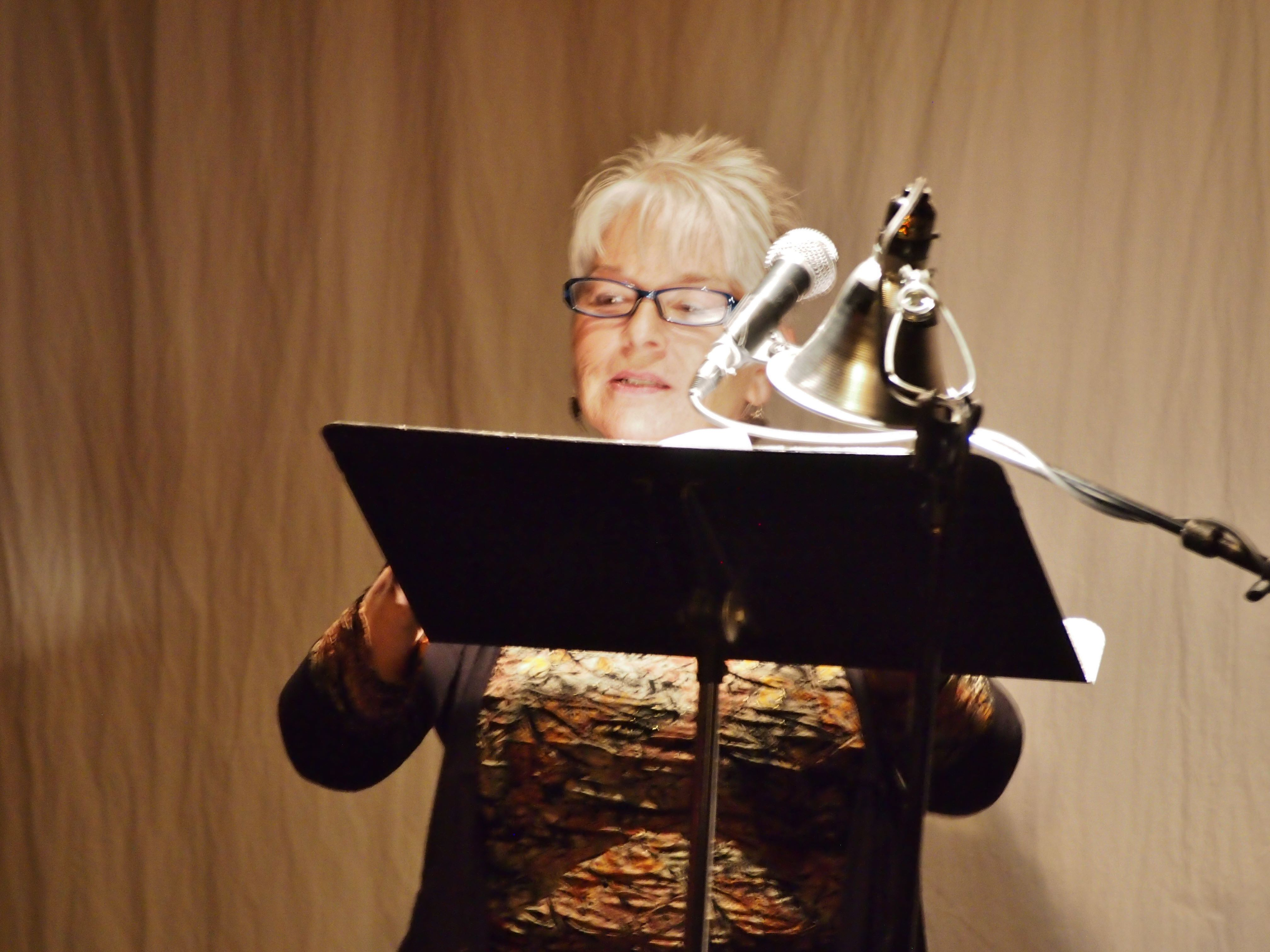
Barbara Goldberg

Barbara Goldberg (born 1943) is an American poet, author, translator, and editor from Maryland.

== Early life and education ==
Goldberg grew up in Forest Hills, Queens> New York. She is a first generation American. Her parents were immigrants from Europe after fleeing from the Holocaust. The language her family spoke in their home was German. She attended Russell Sage Junior High.

She attended Mount Holyoke College for her undergraduate degree in philosophy. Goldberg graduated in 1963 with Phi Beta Kappa recognition.

Goldberg attended Columbia University for a Master of Education and graduated in 1970. She later earned her Master of Fine Arts degree from American University in 1985.

== Career ==
Goldberg started her poetry career in her 30s. Goldberg's poetry deals with themes including magical realism, honesty, authenticity, sensual imagery, and wit.

Goldberg was the Poet-in-Residence in Howard County, Maryland in 1999. The program was sponsored by the Howard County Poetry and Literature Society. During her time in this position, Goldberg visited ten high schools in the county to teach poetry. She has received several grants from the Maryland Arts Council.

She has also taught poetry and creative writing at Georgetown University, American University's MFA program, and the Writer's Center in Bethesda, Maryland.

She was the executive editor of Poet Lore magazine. Goldberg was a senior speechwriter for AARP. Goldberg works as a series editor of Word Works International Editions.

Goldberg has received two fellowships from the National Endowment for the Arts. One of these awards was for a $20,000 literacy fellowship. She has also been a fellow at Yaddo, the MacDowell Colony, and the Virginia Center for the Creative Arts.

She has done readings and presented her works to several programs, organizations, and associations, including the American Literary Translators Association, Associated of Writers and Writing Programs, the International Monetary Fund, the Folger Shakespeare Library, and the Carter Center.

Her works have been included in several literacy publications, including Poetry, the Paris Review, the Harvard Review, the Gettysburg Review, Best American Poetry, and the American Poetry Review.

== Awards ==
Goldberg has received several awards for her writing. She received two PEN Syndicated Fiction Project Awards. In 2008, she received the Felix Pollak Prize in Poetry for The Royal Baker’s Daughter. She also won the Valentin Krustev Award in translation for her work Transformation: The Poetry of Translation, the Witter Bynner Foundation Award for The Stones Remember, the Violet Reed Haas Poetry Prize for Marvelous Pursuits, and the Camden Poetry Award for Cautionary Tales. Her poem “Fortune’s Darling” won the Emily Dickinson Award.

== Works ==
=== Poetry ===
- Berta Broadfoot and Pepin the Short: A Merovingian Romance (1986), ISBN 9780915380206, OCLC 729771175
- Cautionary Tales (1990), ISBN 9780931848780, OCLC 731523419
- Marvelous Pursuits (1995), ISBN 9780963836441, OCLC 32538889
- The Royal Baker's Daughter (2008), ISBN 9780299227241, OCLC 636803506
- Transformation (2019), ISBN 9781733540056, OCLC 1084561966

=== Translations ===
- The Fire Stays in Red: Poems by Ronny Someck (2002) translated by Goldberg and Israeli poet Moshe Dor, ISBN 9780299179045, OCLC 316869644
- Scorched by the Sun, poems by Dor, ISBN 9780915380831, OCLC 930811146

=== Editor ===
- The Stones Remember: Native Israeli Poetry (1991) edited by Dor, Goldberg, and Giora Lesham, ISBN 9780915380251, OCLC 23930833
- The First Yes: Poems About Communicating (1996), ISBN 9780931848926, OCLC 35758082
- Open Door: Selected Poems from Poet Lore, 1980-1996 (1996) by Roland Flint and edited by Goldberg, Philip K. Jason, and Geraldine Connolly, ISBN 978-0965401005
- After the First Rain: Israeli Poems on War and Peace (1998) edited by Dor and Goldberg, ISBN 9780815605249, OCLC 37890562
