= Green Mars (novella) =

- Short story by Kim Stanley Robinson
- Country: USA
- Genre(s): Science fiction

Publication
- Published in: Asimov's Science Fiction
- Publication type: Periodical
- Media type: Print
- Publication date: September 1985

"Green Mars" is a science fiction novella by the American writer Kim Stanley Robinson, first published in Asimov's Science Fiction in September 1985, eight years before his novel of the same name.

The author later said that he wrote the story "mainly to stake a claim – at least a moral claim – on the name. I thought Green Mars was such a good name, such an obvious name." The story describes an expedition climbing Olympus Mons on Mars. Although it is set in a slightly different fictional universe from that of the novel—it has characters which also appear in the author's short works "Exploring Fossil Canyon" (1982) and "A Martian Romance" (1999) — it is one of his first published works set in the landscape of the Mars trilogy. Much like a pilot episode, it introduces the plot premise and central ecological theme of the later series of novels.

That plot premise is that settlement and terraforming of Mars takes place over centuries, guided by pioneers whose lifespans are extended by biotechnology. The ecological theme develops as a struggle between interventionist "greens" who terraform and introduce wildlife on Mars, and conservationist "reds" who seek to preserve the ancient martian landscape unchanged.

At the time the story was written, the most recent missions to Mars were Viking 1 and Viking 2 which reached the planet in the summer of 1976.

== Plot summary ==
The story, set on a terraformed Mars, describes, using the present tense, an expedition climbing Olympus Mons, which is the tallest mountain in the Solar System. It is seen from the viewpoint of Roger Clayborne, who has recently resigned after twenty-seven years as Minister of the Interior at Government House in Burroughs. He feels his political career has been futile. He thinks the planet could have been left as it was found, not turned into another Earth and made a laboratory for new animals and plants.

All but one of the group were born on Mars. The expedition leader is Eileen Monday. People can live for several hundred years, and she and Clayborne are both now about three hundred; she has forgotten their relationship, when they were in their twenties, but Clayborne, who has an unusually complete memory, can recall it. He talks to her of his regrets about the planet; she says his efforts with the Red Mars party would never have succeeded.

The height of Olympus Mons above the base is about 26 kilometres (16 mi). There is a vertical escarpment of about 20,000 feet (6,100 m), above which is the flank of the volcano crater with a gradient of about 6%. The details of mountaineering are described as the group ascends. Members take oxygen on the upper part of the ascent, and strong winds develop. During the climb, one person suffers a broken arm because of a falling rock, and is taken down by a few others; another suffers pulmonary edema because of ascending too rapidly, and is taken to a lower camp to ascend more slowly.

On the flank of the volcano, where they are above the atmosphere, they wear suits and helmets. It is about 250 kilometres (160 mi) from the escarpment to the rim of the crater, and they walk 25–30 kilometres (16–19 mi) a day, sleeping in a pressurized tent. By the end of the journey, Clayborne and Eileen Monday's relationship has revived, and he feels persuaded by her view of the planet.

== Reception ==
"Green Mars" was placed third in the Locus Award for Best Novella in 1986. It was nominated for the Nebula Award for Best Novella, and it was nominated for the Hugo Award for Best Novella in that year.
