= Standard manuscript format =

Conventions regarding how to submit material to publishers

Standard manuscript format is a formatting style for manuscripts of short stories, novels, poems and other literary works submitted by authors to publishers. Even with the advent of desktop publishing, making it possible for anyone to prepare text that appears professionally typeset, many publishers still require authors to submit manuscripts within their respective guidelines. Although there is no single set of guidelines, the "standard" format describes formatting that is considered to be generally acceptable.

Although publishers' guidelines for formatting are the most critical resource for authors, style guides are also key references for authors preparing manuscripts since "virtually all professional editors work closely with one of them in editing a manuscript for publication."

Manuscript formatting depends greatly on the type of work that is being written, as well as the individual publisher, editor or producer. Writers who intend to submit a manuscript should determine what the relevant writing standards are, and follow them. Individual publishers' standards will take precedence over style guides.

== Features ==
In general, a document with standard manuscript format will have the following features:

- 8.5"×11" or A4 paper size.
- Courier or a similar monospaced serif font.
- 12-point (10 pitch) or 10-point (12 pitch) font size.
- Double-spaced lines of text (set in a word processor as 24-point or 20-point line spacing according to the chosen font size).
- 24 or 25 lines of text.
- 1, 1.25 or 1.5 inch margins.
- Paragraph indentation of 0.5 inches.
- Printed one-sided with black ink.

On the first page of the document, the author's name and contact information appears in the top left corner. In the top right corner of the first page, the word count appears.

Subsequent pages only have text in the top right corner. This text includes: the author's name, a slash, an abbreviated title, another slash, and the page number.

== Word count ==
| Left and right margins | Font size | |
| Left and right margins | 12-point (10 pitch) | 10-point (12 pitch) |
Characters and spaces per line
| 1" | 65 | 78 |
| 1.25" | 60 | 72 |
| 1.5" | 55 | 66 |
Characters and spaces per page (24 lines)
| 1" | 1,560 | 1,872 |
| 1.25" | 1,440 | 1,728 |
| 1.5" | 1,320 | 1,584 |
Characters and spaces per page (25 lines)
| 1" | 1,625 | 1,950 |
| 1.25" | 1,500 | 1,800 |
| 1.5" | 1,375 | 1,650 |

Writers can add the word count of the manuscript, although this may also be noted on a query letter. Most publishers pay writers based on a hypothetical number of words in the manuscript. However, this is not the physical count of actual words; this is a rough count of the number of characters divided to better estimate the space that the final text will consume in the published version. Normally, this involves counting every character in the manuscript, including spaces, and dividing by 6. If the correct font size is used, and if the margins are set so that lines contain an average of 60 characters, the editor can easily assume that there are 10 words per line. Furthermore, if the top and bottom margins are set so that there are, for example, 25 lines on each page, the editor can easily count 250 words per page.

== Manuscript handling ==
The final reason involves how editors, copy editors, and typesetters handle manuscripts. They might work on an entire manuscript at one time or the editor might hand groups of pages to the typesetter at a time. Unstapled pages facilitate this.

Page numbers, author's name, and title on every page ensure that if an unstapled manuscript is shuffled on a table, shared among two or more people, or dropped, it can easily be reassembled, and if a stack of unstapled manuscripts is dropped, it can easily be sorted into the correct sets.

== Other manuscript formats ==
There are formatting conventions for different kinds of written works, including:

- Plays and screenplays
- Novels and novellas
- Essays and longer nonfiction works
- Stories and collections of stories
- Poems and collections of poems
- Research or academic papers

== See also ==
- Draft document
- Preprint
- Manuscript format
- Style guides
- List of style guides
- Sentence spacing
- Sentence spacing in language and style guides
