= J. Kathleen Cheney =

- Born: October 19, 1964 (age 61); El Paso, Texas, USA
- Occupation: Author
- Writing career
- Genre: speculative fiction
- Website: jkathleencheney.wordpress.com

J. Kathleen Cheney is an American school teacher and author of speculative fiction, active in the field since 2005 and professionally published since 2007.

== Biography ==
Cheney was born and raised in El Paso, Texas, the daughter of two rocket scientists employed at White Sands Missile Range. She took degrees in English and Marketing. after which she worked first as a department store menswear buyer and then a mathematics teacher. She became a full-time writer in 2005. Her hobbies include fencing, gardening, and travel. She has two dogs.

== Literary career ==
Cheney's work has appeared in various periodicals, including Shimmer Magazine, Fantasy Magazine, and Jim Baen's Universe. She attended two summer writers workshops under James Gunn at the Center for the Study of Science Fiction. She considers C. J. Cherryh, Ansen Dibell, Arthur Conan Doyle, and Georgette Heyer writers whose work has most influenced hers.

She also creates cover art for her own works and those of other writers.

== Bibliography ==
=== Hawk's Folly Farm series ===
- "Iron Shoes" (2010)
- "Snow Comes to Hawk's Folly" (2010)
- "Snowfall" (2016)
- Iron Shoes: Tales from Hawk's Folly Farm (2016) (collection)

=== Kseniya Ilyevna series ===
- "The Dragon's Child" (2008)
- "Early Winter, Near Jenli Village" (2009)
- "The Eretik" (2012)
- "The Dragon's Pearl" (2012)
- "The Legacy of Dragons" (2012)
- "The Waiting Bride" (2012)
- "A Time for Every Purpose" (2017)
- The Dragon's Child (2017) (collection)

=== Palace of Dreams series ===
- "Touching the Dead" (2007)
- Dreaming Death (2016)
- "A Mention of Death" (2018)
- "Endings" (2018)
- Shared Dreams (2018) (collection)
- In Dreaming Bound (2019)

=== The Golden City series ===
- The Golden City (2013)
- The Seat of Magic (2014)
- The Shores of Spain (2015)
- "The Seer's Choice" (2016)
- "After the War" (2016)
- The Truth Undiscovered (2018)
- "Beneath the Waves" (2021)

=== The Horn series ===
- Oathbreaker (2017)
- Original (2017)
- Overseer (2017)

=== The King's Daughter series ===
- "The Nature of Demons" (2013)
- The Amiestrin Gambit (2018)
- The Passing of Pawns (2018)
- The Black Queen (2018)
- "The Arranged Marriage" (2019)
- "The Stains of the Past" (2019)
- "Whatever Else" (2019)
- On Common Ground: Tales from the World of The King's Daughter (2019) (collection)

=== Other short fiction ===
- "A Hand for Each" (2007)
- "First Day Jitters" (2008)
- "Masks of War" (2008)
- "Taking a Mile" (2008)
- "The Bear Girl" (2008)
- "Afterimage" (2010)
- "Fleurs du Mal" (2010)
- "Of Ambergris, Blood, and Brandy" (2011)
- "Of Blood and Brandy" (2012)
- "The Sparrow in Hiding" (2016)

== Awards ==
"Iron Shoes" was nominated for the 2011 Nebula Award for Best Novella. The Golden City placed fifth in the Locus Poll Award for Best First Novel.
