= Mr. Boy =

- The June 1990 issue of Asimov's Science Fiction, where "Mr. Boy" first appeared. The cover depicts the title character (left), his friend Stennie (right), and his mother (background).
- Author: James Patrick Kelly
- Language: English
- Genre: Science fiction
- Published in: Asimov's Science Fiction
- Publication date: June 1990
- Media type: Magazine

"Mr. Boy" is a science fiction novella by American writer James Patrick Kelly, first published in the June 1990 issue of Asimov's Science Fiction. It tells the story of a wealthy boy in the year 2096 who falls in love with a working class girl who inspires him to abandon his decadent lifestyle.

The story won the Asimov's Reader's Poll Award for Best Novella and was nominated for the Locus Poll Award and the Nebula Award. It has been reprinted in several science fiction anthologies.

== Plot ==
The story takes place in the year 2096 in the town of New Canaan, Connecticut, and centers on Peter Cage, who goes by the nickname "Mr. Boy". Peter has lived for 25 years but possesses the body of a 12-year-old as a result of continually undergoing genetic modification ("twanking") to reverse his biological clock. This process is done at the direction of his wealthy but emotionally distant mother. His mother has assumed the form of a three-quarters scale replica of the Statue of Liberty (also through gene twanking), which Peter lives inside. Peter has only ever interacted with his mother through robotic avatars which she controls – her private quarters in the statue's head are inaccessible.

Peter spends much of his time socializing with other wealthy children, including his best friend Stennie, who has been twanked to resemble a "grapefruit yellow stenonychosaurus". The children indulge in orgiastic gatherings such as "smash parties", where they destroy valuable antiques and kill animals. Peter and his social circle look down on members of the working class, referring to them as "stiffs".

At school, Peter sees and falls in love with a girl named Treemonisha Joplin (named for the opera Treemonisha by ragtime composer Scott Joplin). After introducing himself to her, Peter learns that she comes from a working-class family who operate a floristry business in a shopping mall. Peter brings Treemonisha to parties, but finds himself increasingly disillusioned with his life of privilege, and worries that the milieu of wealth and nihilism is having a corrupting influence on Treemonisha.

In the story's climax, Peter angrily storms his mother, expressing resentment of his upbringing. He says that he intends to leave behind his life of comfort and become a working stiff, despite Treemonisha urging him against this and warning him that he is unprepared for a life of poverty. Peter forces entry into her sanctum in the head of the statue, and is surprised to find a cold cleanroom filled with computing hardware. Unbeknownst to him, his mother had been dead all along, existing only as a "downloaded intelligence".

Peter leaves with Treemonisha, hoping that being poor is better than "being rich and hating yourself". In the final line, Peter asks Treemonisha to call him "Pete", rather than the "Mr. Boy" moniker he had previously used throughout the story.

== Analysis ==
In an introduction to the story, Gardner Dozois draws parallels between "Mr. Boy" and the works of F. Scott Fitzgerald, alluding to the opening line of Fitzgerald's short story "The Rich Boy": "Let me tell you about the very rich. They are different from you and me."

== Publication history ==
"Mr. Boy" was originally published in the June 1990 issue of Asimov's Science Fiction. It has subsequently been reprinted in the following anthologies:

- The Year's Best Science Fiction: Eighth Annual Collection (1991, edited by Gardner Dozois)
- Modern Classic Short Novels of Science Fiction (1994, edited by Gardner Dozois)
- Visions of Wonder (1996, edited by David G. Hartwell and Milton T. Wolf)
- Think Like a Dinosaur and Other Stories, a 1997 collection of James Patrick Kelly's short fiction
- Cyberpunk: Stories of Hardware, Software, Wetware, Evolution, and Revolution (2012, edited by Victoria Blake)
