= The Chief Designer (novella) =

- Short story by Andy Duncan
- Language: English
- Genre: Science fiction

Publication
- Published in: Isaac Asimov's Science Fiction Magazine
- Publication type: Magazine
- Publication date: June 2001

"The Chief Designer" is a science fiction novella by American writer Andy Duncan, originally published in the June 2001 issue of the Isaac Asimov's Science Fiction Magazine. It won the 2002 Sturgeon Award and was nominated for the 2002 Hugo Award for Best Novella. It also appeared in Gardner Dozois' The Year's Best Science Fiction: Nineteenth Annual Collection.

== Plot summary ==
The story follows Sergey Korolyov, who served as a slave laborer in Siberia but eventually ends up leading the Soviet Union's space program in Baikonur, Kazakhstan. Throughout his years of service he becomes a respected figure in the USSR's space program. Along the way he implements several designs, helps save the lives of many cosmonauts and struggles with political power plays.
