= Getting to Know You (short story collection) =

2007 short story collection by David Marusek

- Author: David Marusek
- Cover artist: Mark A. Nelson
- Language: English
- Genre: Science fiction
- Publisher: Subterranean Press
- Publication date: 25 January 2007
- Publication place: United States
- Media type: Print (hardcover)
- Pages: 297
- ISBN: 1-59606-088-3
- OCLC: 123766653

Getting to Know You is a short story collection by American writer David Marusek. It contains all of his published science fiction stories as of its publication. Includes an introduction and a commentary on each story by the author.

== Contents ==
- "The Wedding Album" (1999)
- "The Earth is on the Mend" (1993)
- "Yurek Rutz. Yurek Rutz. Yurek Rutz." (1999)
- "A Boy in Cathyland" (2001)
- "We Were Out of Our Minds with Joy" (1995)
- "VTV" (2000)
- "Cabbages and Kale or: How We Downsized North America" (1999)
- "Getting to Know You" (1997)
- "Listen to Me" (2003)
- "My Morning Glory" (2006)

== Awards and nominations ==
- Quill Awards Science Fiction/Fantasy/Horror nominee(2007)

== Sources, external links, quotations ==
- BookSpotCentral review by Matt Denault
- UberReview review by Ryan Freebern
- Greenman review by Richard Dansky
- Scifi.com review by Paul Di Filippo
- Official site of the publisher
