= The Wedding Album (short story) =

1999 science fiction short story by David Marusek

"The Wedding Album" is a science fiction short story by David Marusek. It was first published in Asimov's Science Fiction in June 1999.

== Synopsis ==
After their wedding, Anne and Ben realize that they are merely recordings of the real Anne and Ben, destined to relive the hours surrounding the wedding for all eternity.

== Reception ==
"The Wedding Album" won the 2000 Theodore Sturgeon Award, and was a finalist for the 1999 Nebula Award for Best Novella. In the New York Times, Dave Itzkoff described it as "ominous and surprisingly moving". At Strange Horizons, however, Adam Roberts felt that it "show(s) signs of being overboiled" and is "too long" — specifying that it is "very good, but (...) could be better." Cory Doctorow stated that the story "floored" him, praising how it "reels from heartbreaking to mind-bending like a poet on a magnificent drunk".
