= The Blind Geometer =

Science fiction story by American writer Kim Stanley Robinson published in 1986

"The Blind Geometer" is a 1986 science fiction story by American writer Kim Stanley Robinson. It was published by Asimov's Science Fiction.

== Plot summary ==
Carlos Nevsky is a blind professor of solid geometry who discovers that his new colleagues are manipulating him for sinister purposes.

== Reception ==
"The Blind Geometer" won the Nebula Award for Best Novella in 1987, and was a finalist for the 1988 Hugo Award for Best Novella.

The Los Angeles Review of Books considered that the story "amply demonstrates Robinson’s hard-SF credentials". Strange Horizons, however, felt that it was "ambitious but awkward", with an "uneven mix of perceptual philosophy and conspiracy thriller."
