= Brenda Clough =

American writer

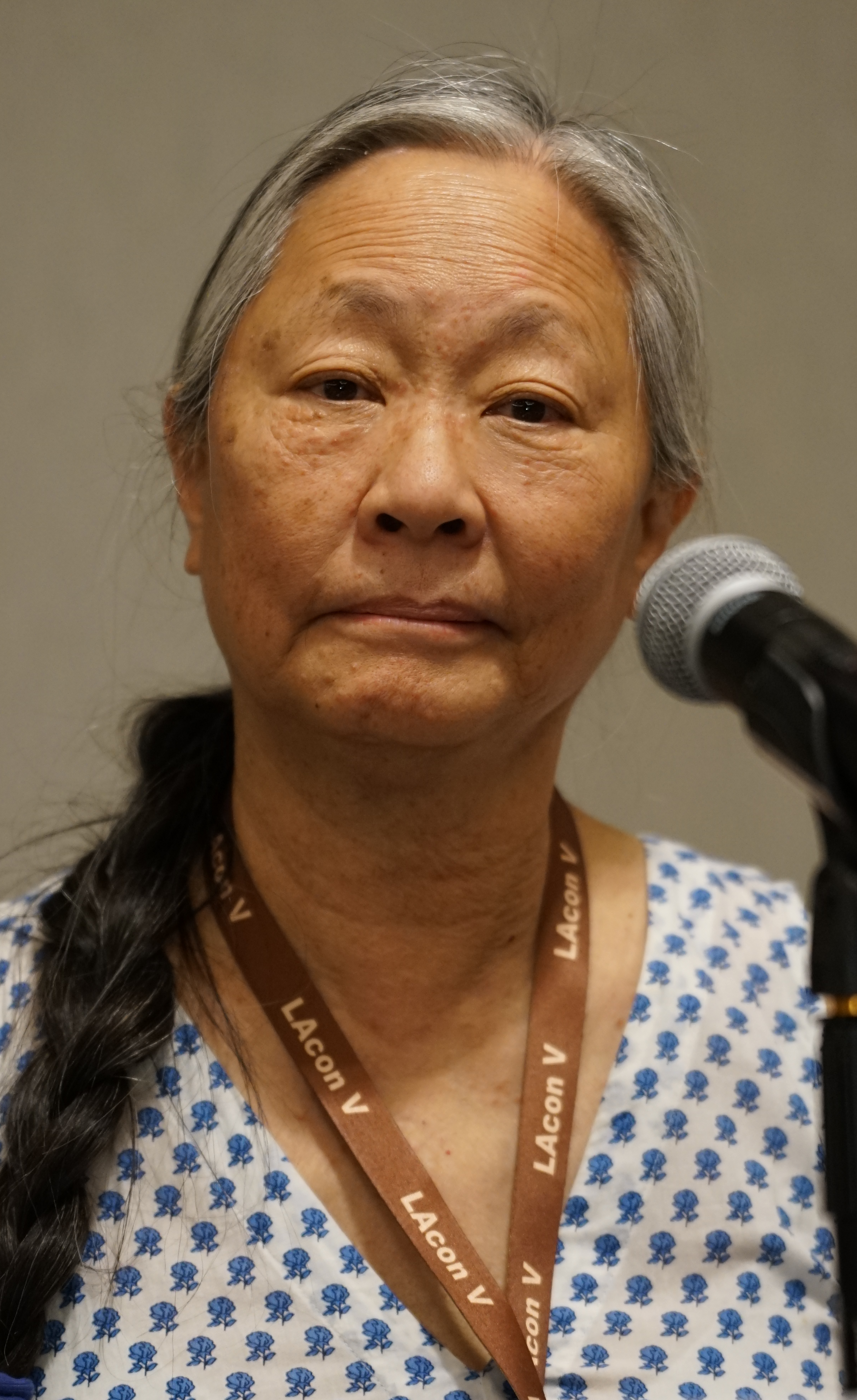
- Clough at Worldcon 2026
- Born: Brenda Wang; November 13, 1955 (age 70); Washington, D.C., U.S.
- Other name: B.W. Clough
- Education: Carnegie Mellon University
- Occupations: Science fiction and fantasy writer
- Notable work: May Be Some Time
- Spouse: Larry Clough
- Website: brendaclough.net

Brenda W. Clough (also credited as B.W. Clough) (pronounced Cluff) (born November 13, 1955) is an American science fiction and fantasy writer. She has been nominated for the Hugo and Nebula Awards in 2002 for her novella May Be Some Time.

== Background and personal life ==
Born Brenda Wang on November 13, 1955, in Washington, D.C., she is the child of Chinese immigrants. In a 2014 interview, she related that "for the first five years of my life I spoke only Chinese. I am told that I started kindergarten without a word of English. I can remember nothing of this, and now only speak Chinese at, you guessed it, a five-year-old level."

She is a self-described "State Department brat" who spent a large amount of her childhood and teenage years living in Europe and Asia (including Manila and Hong Kong) due to her father's career. According to her website, "as a girl" she attended the American School of Vientiane in Laos. She later attended Carnegie Mellon University.

She lives with her husband, Larry Clough, in Portland, Oregon.

== Career ==
Starting with her first published novel in 1984, Clough's works have covered a range of subgenres including, high fantasy, contemporary stories of people with extrasensory perception, time travel stories set in Antarctica, novels set in the Victorian era—including a 12-book historical fiction series following up on Wilkie Collins' 1860 The Woman in White—and alternate histories of China from the Bronze Age to steampunk.

Clough taught science fiction and fantasy writing workshops at the Writer's Center in Bethesda, Maryland and at the Baltimore Science Fiction Society

She is a member of the Book View Café writer's cooperative.

== Bibliography ==
=== Novels ===
==== Averidan series ====
- The Crystal Crown, DAW, New York, 1984. ISBN 978-0886772833
- The Dragon of Mishbil, DAW, New York, 1985. ISBN 978-0981848723
- The Realm Beneath, DAW, New York, 1986. ISBN 978-0886771379
- The Name of the Sun, DAW, New York, 1988. ISBN 978-0886772826

==== Suburban Gods series ====
- How Like a God, Tor Books, New York, 1997. ISBN 978-0312862633
- Doors of Death and Life, Tor Books, New York, 2000. ISBN 978-0312870645
- Out of the Abyss (as yet unpublished sequel to Doors of Death and Life)

==== The Thrilling Adventures of the Most Dangerous Woman in Europe ====
- Marian Halcombe, 2018. Book View Cafe.
- The King of the Book, 2021 Book View Cafe.
- The Jaguar Queen of Copal, 2021. Book View Cafe.
- The Earl in the Shadows, 2021. Book View Cafe.
- The True Prince of Vaurantania, 2021. Book View Cafe.
- The River Horse Tsar, 2021. Book View Cafe.
- The Nautilus Knight, 2021. Book View Cafe.
- The Compass of Truth, 2021. Book View Cafe.
- The Pirate Princess, 2021. Book View Cafe.
- The Single Musketeer, 2021. Book View Cafe.
- The Cobra Marked King, 2021. Book View Cafe.
- Servants of the Empress, 2024. Book View Cafe.

==== Other novels ====
- An Impossumble Summer, Walker and Company, New York, 1992. ISBN 978-0802781505
- Revise the World, Book View Cafe, 2009. ISBN 978-1-61138-002-6
- Speak to Our Desires, Book View Cafe, 2011. ISBN 978-1-61138-038-5
- The River Twice, Book View Cafe, 2019. ISBN 978-1-61138-764-3
- Meet Myself There, Book View Cafe, 2019. ISBN 978-1-61138-769-8
- The Fog of Time, Book View Cafe, 2019. ISBN 978-1-61138-770-4

=== Short stories ===
- "Ain't Nothin' but a Hound Dog", Rod Serling's The Twilight Zone Magazine, 1988 [link]
- "The Indecorous Rescue of Clarinda Merwin", Aboriginal SF, Mar/Apr 1989
- "Provisional Solution", Carmen Miranda's Ghost is Haunting Space Station Three, 1990
- "La Vita Nuova", Carmen Miranda's Ghost Is Haunting Space Station Three, 1990
- "In the Good Old Summer Time", Newer York, 1991
- "Mastermind of Oz" (with Lawrence Watt-Evans), Amazing, April 1993
- "The Bottomless Pit", Marion Zimmer Bradley's Fantasy Magazine, Winter 1994
- "Handing on the Goggles", Superheroes, 1995
- "The Product of the Extremes", How to Save the World 1995
- "To Serve a Prince", Science Fiction Age, Nov. 1995
- "The Birth Day", The Sandman: Book of Dreams, HarperPrism, 1996
- "Grow Your Own", Alfred Hitchcock's Mystery Magazine, 2000
- "Times Fifty", Christianity Today, October 1, 2001
- "May Be Some Time", Analog, April 2001
- "Tiptoe, On a Fence Post", Analog, July–August 2002
- "Escape Hatch", Paradox, Autumn 2003
- "How the Bells Came from Yang to Hubei", The First Heroes, Tor 2004

=== Non-fiction ===
- "Prairie Oysters in Hell: Interpretations of Isherwood in Dramatic Media", The Reston Review, first quarter 1992 [link]
- "The Theory and Practice of Titles", SFWA Bulletin, Fall 1995 [link]
- "Why I live in Washington, DC", SFWA Bulletin, Fall 1997
- "Swindlers, Sharks & Scams: Writer Beware!" (with Ann C. Crispin), SFWA Bulletin, series starting in Vol 32, Issue 3, Winter 1998
- Jo Clayton's Online Lifeline, 1999 [link]
- "Inside Worldcon: the Writers Tour", SFWA Bulletin, Spring 2003
- "Pride and Preservation, or Finding a Home for Your Papers" (with Colleen R. Cahill), SFWA Bulletin, Winter 2004
