= The Saturn Game =

- Short story by Poul Anderson
- cover art by Vincent Di Fate
- Genre: Science fiction

Publication
- Publisher: Analog
- Publication date: 2 February 1981

"The Saturn Game" is a science fiction novella by American writer Poul Anderson, originally published in Analog Science Fiction and Fact in February 1981.

== Plot summary ==
Imaginative roleplaying provides relief for some of the crew on the long, dull trip to Saturn. However, their imaginary world becomes hazardously confused with the real one when a team begins the exploration of Iapetus, one of Saturn's moons.

== Reception ==
"The Saturn Game" won the 1981 Nebula Award for Best Novella and the 1982 Hugo Award for Best Novella.

== Sources, references, external links, quotations ==
- The Saturn Game title listing at the Internet Speculative Fiction Database
