= Andy Duncan (writer) =

American science fiction & fantasy writer

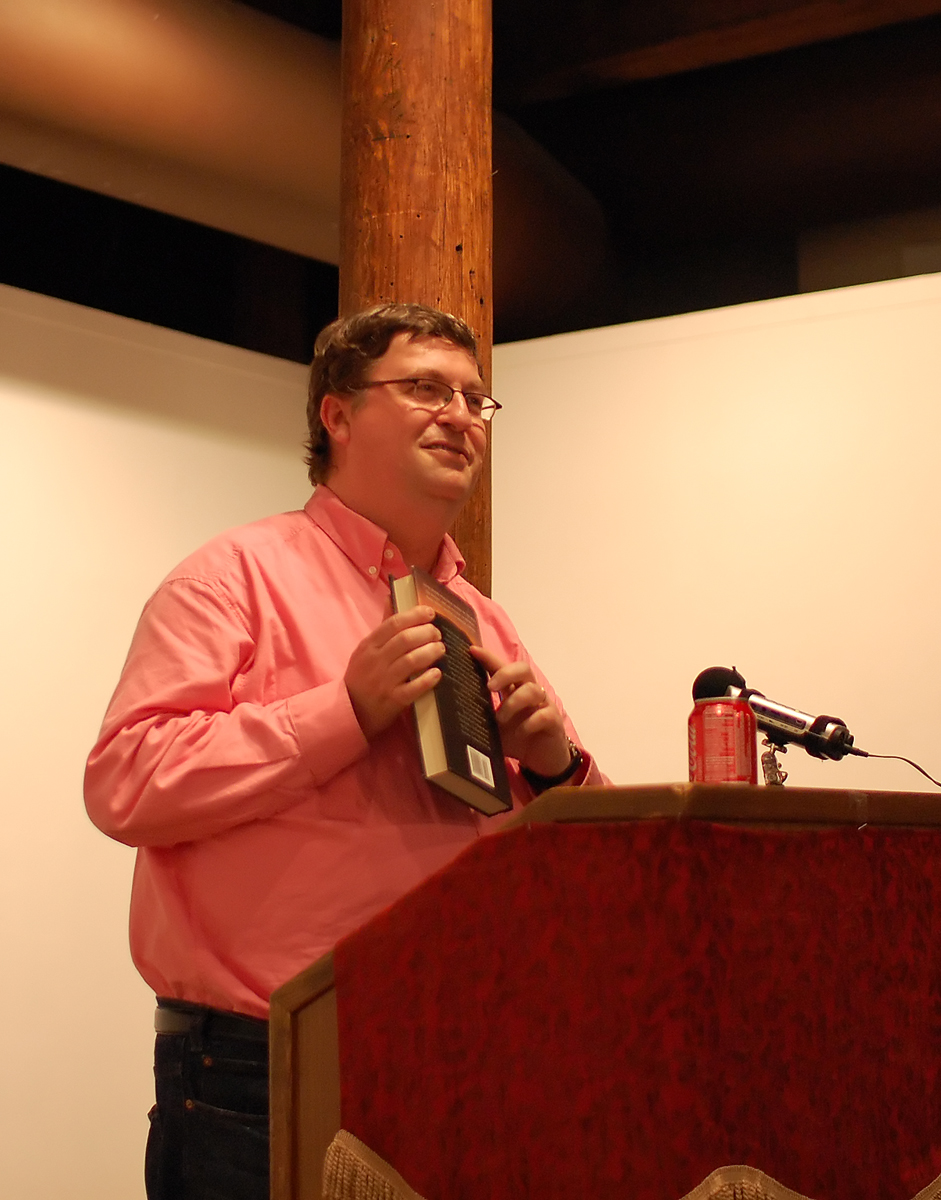
- Duncan in 2008
- Born: September 21, 1964 (age 61); Batesburg, South Carolina, U.S.
- Education: University of South Carolina; North Carolina State University (MA); University of Alabama (MFA); Clarion West Writers Workshop
- Occupation: Writer
- Spouse: Sydney
- Writing career
- Genres: Science fiction; fantasy
- Notable awards: Theodore Sturgeon Award (2002); World Fantasy Award (x3); Nebula Award for Best Novelette (2012)
- Website: www.angelfire.com/al/andyduncan/

Andy Duncan (born September 21, 1964) is an American science fiction and fantasy writer whose work frequently deals with Southern U.S. themes.

== Biography ==
Duncan was born in Batesburg, South Carolina and graduated from high school from W. Wyman King Academy. He earned a degree in journalism from the University of South Carolina and worked for seven years at the Greensboro News & Record.

Duncan earned an M.A. in creative writing (fiction) from North Carolina State University and an M.F.A. in fiction writing from the University of Alabama. He also attended Clarion West Writers Workshop in 1994.

In Fall 2008, he was hired as an assistant professor of English at Frostburg State University in Frostburg, Maryland.

His novelette "Close Encounters" won the 2012 Nebula Award for Best Novelette. His novelette "An Agent of Utopia" was a finalist for the 2018 Nebula Award.

His fiction has appeared in a number of venues, including Asimov's Science Fiction, Realms of Fantasy, Weird Tales, Sci Fiction, and Escape Pod. He has also published poetry, essays, and reviews.

== Professional activities ==
In October 2022, Andy Duncan was a guest on the Maryland State Library Agency podcast in the episode titled "Spooky Maryland Stories with Andy Duncan".

He was a senior editor at Overdrive, a magazine for truck drivers, from 2003 to 2008.

Duncan was an instructor at Clarion Workshop in 2004 and 2013, and at Clarion West Writers Workshop in 2005.

He has frequently given readings and spoken on panels at such venues as the International Conference on the Fantastic in the Arts, held each spring in Florida.

Duncan starred as the main character, Counter, in a live dramatization of Jeanne Beckwith's one-act play The Back Room, performed with award-winning authors John Kessel and James K. Morrow, author and scholar F. Brett Cox, writer and critic Fiona Kelleghan, Sydney Sowers, and Buffy the Vampire Slayer expert Rhonda V. Wilcox. The play was presented at the 17th International Conference on the Fantastic in the Arts, held in Fort Lauderdale, Florida, March 19, 1999.

== Personal life ==
Duncan currently lives with his wife Sydney in Frostburg, Maryland along with a 17 year old dog Lily, and cats Bella and Hilary.

== Awards ==
He has won the Theodore Sturgeon Award. and three World Fantasy Awards, and has been nominated for Hugo, Nebula Award and Shirley Jackson Award. The Night Cache was nominated in the Best Novella category for a 2010 World Fantasy Award.

Work	Year & Award	Category	Result	Ref.
"Beluthahatchie"	1998 Hugo Award	Short Story	Nominated	
"Beluthahatchie"	1998 Asimov's Readers' Poll	Short Story	8th Place	
"Beluthahatchie"	1998 Astounding Award	New Writer	Nominated	
"The Genetic Engineer Throws a Cocktail Party and Drinks Too Much"	1999 Asimov's Readers' Poll	Poem	5th Place	
"The Executioners' Guild"	1999 HOMer Award	Novella	Nominated	
"The Executioners' Guild"	1999 International Horror Guild Award	Long Fiction	Nominated	
"The Executioners' Guild"	2000 Nebula Award	Novella	Nominated	
"The Executioners' Guild"	2000 Asimov's Readers' Poll	Novella	2nd Place	
"The Executioners' Guild"	2000 Locus Award	Novella	Nominated	
"Green Fire" (with Eileen Gunn, Pat Murphy & Michael Swanwick)	2001 Asimov's Readers' Poll	Novella	8th Place	
Beluthahatchie and Other Stories	2001 World Fantasy Award	Collection	Won	
Beluthahatchie and Other Stories	2001 Locus Award	Collection	Nominated	
"Fenneman's Mouth"	2001 Locus Award	Short Story	Nominated	
"Fortitude"	2001 Nebula Award	Novella	Nominated	
"The Pottawatomie Giant"	2001 World Fantasy Award	Short Fiction	Won	
"The Pottawatomie Giant"	2001 Locus Award	Novelette	Nominated	
"The Pottawatomie Giant"	2002 Nebula Award	Novelette	Nominated	
"Lincoln in Frogmore"	2001 World Fantasy Award	Short Fiction	Nominated	
"Lincoln in Frogmore"	2001 Locus Award	Novelette	Nominated	
"Lincoln in Frogmore"	2002 Asimov's Readers' Poll	Novelette	4th Place	
"Senator Bilbo"	2002 Locus Award	Short Story	Nominated	
"The Chief Designer"	2002 Hugo Award	Novella	Nominated	
"The Chief Designer"	2002 Theodore Sturgeon Award	Short Science Fiction	Won	
"The Chief Designer"	2002 Locus Award	Novella	Nominated	
"The Chief Designer"	2002 Asimov's Readers' Poll	Novella	4th Place	
"The Chief Designer"	2003 Nebula Award	Novella	Nominated	
"The Big Rock Candy Mountain"	2003 Locus Award	Novelette	Nominated	
"Daddy Mention and the Monday Skull"	2004 Locus Award	Short Story	Nominated	
"Zora and the Zombie"	2004 Bram Stoker Award	Long Fiction	Nominated	
"Zora and the Zombie"	2005 Locus Award	Short Story	Nominated	
"Zora and the Zombie"	2005 Nebula Award	Novelette	Nominated	
"Unique Chicken Goes In Reverse"	2007 Shirley Jackson Award	Short Story	Nominated	
"Unique Chicken Goes In Reverse"	2008 Nebula Award	Short Story	Nominated	
"Unique Chicken Goes In Reverse"	2008 Locus Award	Short Story	Nominated	
"A Diorama of the Infernal Regions, or The Devil's Ninth Question"	2008 Locus Award	Novelette	Nominated	
"The Night Cache"	2009 Shirley Jackson Award	Novelette	Nominated	
"The Night Cache"	2010 World Fantasy Award	Novella	Nominated	
"The Dragaman's Bride"	2010 Locus Award	Novelette	Nominated	
"Slow as a Bullet"	2012 Locus Award	Short Story	Nominated	
"Close Encounters"	2013 Nebula Award	Novelette	Won	
"Close Encounters"	2013 Locus Award	Novelette	Nominated	
The Pottawatomie Giant and Other Stories	2013 Locus Award	Collection	Nominated	
The Pottawatomie Giant and Other Stories	2013 Shirley Jackson Award	Collection	Nominated	
"Wakulla Springs" (with Ellen Klages)	2014 Hugo Award	Novella	Nominated	
"Wakulla Springs" (with Ellen Klages)	2014 Nebula Award	Novella	Nominated	
"Wakulla Springs" (with Ellen Klages)	2014 World Fantasy Award	Novella	Won	
"Wakulla Springs" (with Ellen Klages)	2014 Locus Award	Novella	Nominated	
"An Agent of Utopia"	2019 Nebula Award	Novelette	Nominated	
"An Agent of Utopia"	2019 Locus Award	Novelette	Nominated	
An Agent of Utopia: New & Selected Stories	2019 World Fantasy Award	Collection	Nominated	
An Agent of Utopia: New & Selected Stories	2019 Locus Award	Collection	Nominated	
"Charlie Tells Another One"	2020 Asimov's Readers' Poll	Novelette	5th Place	
	2021 Science Fiction Research Association	Mary Kay Bray Award	Won	

== Bibliography ==
=== Novels ===
- The Night Cache (stand-alone novella), 2009, PS Publishing, (ISBN 9781848630642)

=== Collections ===
- An Agent of Utopia: New and Selected Stories, Small Beer Press, 2018 (ISBN 9781618731531)
- The Pottawatomie Giant and Other Stories, PS Publishing, 2011 (ISBN 9781848633094)
- Beluthahatchie and Other Stories, Golden Gryphon Press, 2000 (ISBN 9780965590112)

=== Edited works ===
- Crossroads: Tales of the Southern Literary Fantastic (with F. Brett Cox), Tor Books, 2004 (ISBN 9780765308139)

=== Nonfiction ===
- Alabama Curiosities: Quirky Characters, Roadside Oddities & Other Offbeat Stuff, Globe Pequot, 2005 (ISBN 9780762730889)
