= Sailing to Byzantium (novella) =

1985 novella by Robert Silverberg

- First book edition
- Author: Robert Silverberg
- Cover artist: Ned Dameron
- Language: English
- Publisher: Underwood-Miller
- Publication date: 1986
- Publication place: United States
- Media type: Print
- Pages: 114 pp
- ISBN: 0-88733-007-X
- OCLC: 12130865

"Sailing to Byzantium" is a novella by the American writer Robert Silverberg. It was first published in Asimov's Science Fiction in February 1985, then in June 1985 with a book edition. The novella takes its name from the poem "Sailing to Byzantium" by W. B. Yeats. The story, like the poem, deals with immortality, and includes quotations from the poem.

== Story summary ==
On 50th-century Earth, people live in recreations of historical cities. Currently the cities are Chang-an, Asgard, New Chicago, Timbuctoo and Alexandria. They are periodically dismantled and replaced with a different city; there are never more than five. They are populated with "temporaries", who live as they would have done in the era of the city. "Temporaries" seem to have been created to provide the impression of realism.

Charles Phillips and his partner Gioia are in ancient Alexandria. They visit the lighthouse and the library; he wonders if the buildings are reproductions or authentic. Phillips is from New York of the year 1984, and does not know how or why he is in the 50th century. Gioia's people never work: they see the sights during the day and go to parties in the evening.

Phillips and Gioia soon move to Chang-an. They are guests of the Emperor, who, like most of those present at court, is a "temporary". He had the impression that Gioia's people do not age, and is surprised that she looks at some gray hairs she has, seeming to be worried about ageing. In the evening after the banquet he realizes he is with Belilala; Gioia has drifted away.

Mohenjo-daro has recently replaced one of the other cities. Belilala tells Phillips that Gioia is already there. She says Gioia is a "short-timer", one who ages, unlike most people; like all short-timers, Gioia is impatient to move on. They go to Mohenjo-daro, but he does not find her. There Phillips meets Francis Willoughby, from England of 1591, brought as a "visitor", like Phillips, to the 50th century.

Phillips finds Gioia in New Chicago, a city of an era later than his. Not wishing him to see her looking older, she soon flees. He meets a "visitor", from Phillips's future, who tells him that visitors do not age, and explains that visitors are self-aware beings created by those who also created the cities and temporaries.

After searching in other cities, Phillips finds Gioia again in Alexandria, looking still older. Both aware that she is aging and that Phillips is not, a solution is proposed. Phillips asks her to accompany him in search of those who supervise the world, creating the cities and visitors, so that Gioia's mind can be placed in an immortal visitor body. She agrees, and they set off in search of the supervisors.

== Reception ==
"Sailing to Byzantium" won the Nebula Award for Best Novella in 1986. It was placed second in the Locus Award for Best Novella in that year, and it was nominated for the Hugo Award for Best Novella.
