= List of works by Catherine Asaro =

This is the bibliography of American space opera and hard science fiction author Catherine Asaro.

== Published works ==
=== Saga of the Skolian Empire ===
==== Reading order by date of publication ====
Note that the stories were published in a non-chronological sequence, from the perspective of the characters.

1. Primary Inversion (1995), rewritten version available online in Baen Free Library (2008–2012)
  - "Light and Shadow" (novelette appearing in Analog, ed. Stanley Schmidt) (1994)
2. Catch the Lightning (1996)
3. The Last Hawk (1997)
4. The Radiant Seas (1999)
  - Aurora in Four Voices (novella appearing in Analog, ed. Stanley Schmidt) (1998)
5. Ascendant Sun (2000)
  - A Roll of the Dice (novella appearing in Analog, ed. Stanley Schmidt) (2000)
6. The Quantum Rose (2000) (also serialized in Analog, ed. Stanley Schmidt) (1999)
  - "Ave de Paso" (short story appearing in the following anthologies: Redshift: Extreme Visions of Speculative Fiction, ed. Al Sarrantonio, (2001); Fantasy: The Best of 2001, ed. Robert Silverberg and Karen Haber, (2002); Aurora in Four Voices, ed. Steven Silver (2011))
  - "Soul of Light" (short story appearing in the following anthologies: Sextopia, ed. Cecilia Tan (2001); Erotic Fantastic: The Best of Circlet Press, 1992–2002, ed. Cecilia Tan (2003)
7. Spherical Harmonic (2001)
8. The Moon's Shadow (2003)
9. Skyfall (2004)
  - Stained Glass Heart (novella appearing in anthology Irresistible Forces, ed. Catherine Asaro) (2004)
  - Walk in Silence (novella appearing in Analog, ed. Stanley Schmidt) (2003)
10. Schism (2004)
  - "The Edges of Never-Haven" (short story appearing in anthology Flights: Extreme Visions of Fantasy, ed. Al Sarrantonio) (2004)
  - The City of Cries (novella appearing in Down These Dark Spaceways, ed. Mike Resnick) (2005)
  - "The Shadowed Heart" (novelette appearing in anthology The Journey Home, ed. Mary Kirk (2005), and Best New Paranormal Romance, ed. Paula Guran, (2006))
11. The Final Key (2005)
  - "Echoes of Pride" (short story appearing in anthology Space Cadets, ed. Mike Resnick) (2006) Also in 2013; see below
  - The Ruby Dice (novella appearing in Jim Baen's Universe, ed. Eric Flint) (2006)
12. The Ruby Dice (2008)
  - The Spacetime Pool (novella appearing in Analog 2008; also appeared in the anthology The Spacetime Pool in 2012; see below). Takes place in an alternate universe that also includes the Skolian saga.
13. Diamond Star (2009)
14. Carnelians (2011)
15. Aurora in Four Voices (anthology, ed. Steven Silver) (2011). Includes "Aurora in Four Voices", "Ave de Paso", "The Spacetime Pool", "Light and Shadow", The City of Cries, "A Poetry of Angles and Dreams" (essay on how Asaro uses math in her fiction), Introduction by Kate Dolan, and Afterword by Aly Parsons.
16. The City of Cries, eBook, (2012)
17. The Spacetime Pool eBook (2012). Includes "The Spacetime Pool", "Light and Shadow," and the math essay "A Poetry of Angles and Dreams"
18. "The Pyre of New Day" (novelette appearing in anthology The Mammoth Book of SF Wars, ed. Ian Watson and Ian Whates) (2012)
19. "Echoes of Pride" (appearing in Galaxy's Edge magazine) (Issue 5, November 2013)
20. Lightning Strike, Book I, 2014, an expanded version of the first half of Catch the Lightning
21. "The Wages of Honor" (novelette appearing in anthology Infinite Stars, ed. Bryan Thomas Schmidt) (2017)
22. Lightning Strike, Book II, 2020, an expanded version of the second half of Catch the Lightning
23. Stained Glass Radiance (February 2, 2027; ISBN 978-1668073674)

==== Reading order by internal chronology ====
A Reader's Guide

Note: the name(s) in parentheses denotes the main character.

1. Skyfall (Roca Skolia, Eldrinson Althor Valdoria, Kurj Skolia)
2. "The Wages of Honor" (Eldrin Valdoria and Althor Valdoria)
3. Stained Glass Heart (Havyrl Torcellei Valdoria)
4. Schism (Sauscony (Soz) Lahaylia Valdoria)
5. "Echoes of Pride" (Sauscony (Soz) Lahaylia Valdoria)
6. The Final Key (Sauscony Lahaylia Valdoria/rest of her family)
7. "The Edges of Never-Haven" (Denric Winward Valdoria)
8. "Light and Shadow" (Kelricson Garlin Valdoria)
9. Aurora in Four Voices (Sauscony Lahaylia Valdoria)
10. Walk in Silence (Jess Fernandez)
11. "The Pyre of New Day" (Sauscony (Soz) Lahaylia Valdoria)
12. The Last Hawk (Kelricson Garlin Valdoria)
13. Primary Inversion (Sauscony (Soz) Lahaylia Valdoria) This was the first published book
14. The Radiant Seas (Sauscony (Soz) Lahaylia Valdoria/rest of her family)
15. "Soul of Light" (Althor Valdoria, Coop, Vaz Majda)
16. "The Shadowed Heart" (Jason Harrick)
  - Aftermath of Radiance War—the following four stories have a great deal of overlap but follow different characters
17. Ascendant Sun (Kelricson Garlin Valdoria)
18. The Quantum Rose (Kamoj Argali, Havyrl Torcellei Valdoria)
19. Spherical Harmonic (Dyhianna Selei)
20. The Moon's Shadow (Jaibriol Qox Skolia)
21. Diamond Star (Del-Kurj Arden Valdoria)
22. A Roll of the Dice (Jeremiah Coltman)
23. The Ruby Dice (novella, Kelricson Garlin Valdoria)
24. The Ruby Dice (full-length novel, Jaibriol Qox Skolia and Kelricson Garlin Valdoria)
25. Carnelians (Kelricson Garlin Valdoria, Jaibriol Qox Skolia, Del-Kurj Arden Valdoria)
26. "Ave de Paso" (Akushtina Santis Pulivok)
27. Catch the Lightning (Akushtina Santis Pulivok, Althor Vyan Selei)
28. Lightning Strike, Book I (Akushtina Santis Pulivok, Althor Vyan Selei)
29. Lightning Strike, Book II (Akushtina Santis Pulivok, Althor Vyan Selei)

==== Skolian Empire—Major Bhaajan series ====
1. Children of the Dust (prequel novella to the series, available online at www.baen.com), September 15, 2017.
  - Also as part of the anthology Down these Dark Spaceways published May 2005 by the Science Fiction Book Club.
2. Undercity, December 2, 2014. The first part of this three-part novel was previously published as the novella The City of Cries.
3. The Bronze Skies, September 5, 2017
4. The Vanished Seas, July 7, 2020
5. The Jigsaw Assassin , July 5, 2022

==== Skolian EmpirevDust Knights series ====
- Based on characters introduced in the Major Bhaajan Series
1. The Down Deep, (July 2 2024; ISBN 978-1982193508)
2. Gold Dust, (October 7 2025; ISBN 978-1668072905)

=== Lost Continent ===
Lost Continent (AKA Aronsdale) series (Romantic fantasy)

1. The Charmed Sphere (2004)
  - "Moonglow" novella (Charmed Destinies, ed. Mary Theresa Hussey (2003))
2. The Misted Cliffs (2005)
3. The Dawn Star (2006)
4. The Fire Opal (2007)
5. The Night Bird (2008)
6. "The Topaz Desert" (Lace and Blade, ed. Deborah Ross, 2008)

=== Other works ===
- The Veiled Web (1999)
- The Phoenix Code (2000)
- Sunrise Alley (2004)
- Alpha (Sequel to Sunrise Alley) (2006)
- "Dance in Blue" novelette (Christmas Forever, ed. David Hartwell, (1993), Wondrous Beginnings, ed. Steven H Silver (2003), and A Cosmic Christmas, ed. Hank Davis (2012))
- "Boot Hill" short story written with Mike Resnick (Civil War Fantastic, ed. Martin H. Greenberg, (2000) and With a Little Help from My Friends: Stories by Hugo and Nebula Winner Mike Resnick in Collaboration with . . . ed. Mike Resnick (2002))
- The Phoenix Code rewritten eBook version (2013)
- "Corn Fed Blues," with Kate Dolan (Deco Punk: The Spirit of an Age, ed. Judith K. Dial and Thomas A. Easton) (2015)

=== Editor ===
- Mindsparks the Magazine of Science and Science Fiction, Editor and founder, Catherine Asaro, 1993–1996
- Irresistible Forces, ed. Catherine Asaro (2004)
- Nebula Awards Showcase 2013, ed. Catherine Asaro (2013)

=== Inclusion in collections with works by other authors ===
- Civil War Fantastic, ed. Martin H. Greenberg (2000)
- Redshift: Extreme Visions of Speculative Fiction, ed. Al Sarrantonio (2001)
- Fantasy: the Best of 2001, ed. Robert Silverberg and Karen Haber (2002)
- Charmed Destinies, ed. Mary Theresa Hussey (2003)
- Nebula Awards Showcase 2003, ed. Nancy Kress (2003)
- Flights: Extreme Visions of Fantasy, ed. Al Sarrantonio (2004)
- Projections: Science Fiction in Literature & Film, ed. Lou Anders (2004) Nonfiction
- The Journey Home, ed. Mary Kirk (2005)
- Down These Dark Spaceways, ed. Mike Resnick (2005)
- Year Million, ed. Damien Broderick Nonfiction (2008) Nonfiction
- Strange Divisions and Alien Territories: The Sub-genres of Science Fiction [sic], ed. Keith Brooke (2012) Nonfiction; chapter written with Kate Dolan
- The Mammoth Book of SF Wars, ed. Ian Whates and Ian Watson, (2012)
- Deco Punk: The Spirit of An Age, ed. Judith K. Dial and Thomas A. Easton, (2015)
- Infinite Stars, ed. Bryan Thomas Schmidt, (2017)

== Discography ==
- Diamond Star, Point Valid with Catherine Asaro (2009), CD
- Goodbye Note, Asaro and Wolcott (2010), EP
- "Deep Snows," Catherine Asaro (2012), Single
- "Looking for Sunsets," Catherine Asaro (2013), Demo
- "Ancient Ages," Catherine Asaro, songwriter Arlan Andrews (2018)[

== Scientific articles ==
- "Photoionization of Molecular Oxygen", P.W. Langoff, A. Gerwer, C. Asaro, and B.V. McKoy, International Journal of Quantum Chemistry, Quantum Chemistry Symposium 13, 645 (1979). (Conference proceedings for 1980 JCP article.)
- "Photoexcitation and Ionization in Molecular Oxygen: Theoretical Studies of Electronic Transitions in the Discrete and Continuous Spectral Intervals", A. Gerwer, C. Asaro, B.V. McKoy, and P.W. Langhoff, Journal of Chemical Physics 72, pp. 713–727 (1980)
- "Stieltjes-Imaging Calculations of Photodissociation", C. Asaro and A. Dalgarno, Journal of Chemical Physics 78, pp. 200–205 (1983)
- "Bound Vibrational Levels of the Two Lowest ^{1}Σ^{+} States of LiF", Catherine Asaro and A. Dalgarno, Chemical Physics Letters 118:1 pp. 64–66 (1985)
- "Polarization Control of Branching Ratios in Photodissociation", Catherine Asaro, Paul Brumer, and Moshe Shapiro, Physical Review Letters 60(16) pp. 1634–? (18 April 1988)
- "Complex speeds and special relativity", Catherine Asaro, American Journal of Physics, 64:4 pp. 421–429 (April 1996)
- "Special relativity and complex speeds", Catherine Asaro, NASA Breakthrough Propulsion Physics Workshop, August 1997
