= The Ruby Dice =

2009 novel by Catherine Asaro

- Author: Catherine Asaro
- Language: English
- Series: Saga of the Skolian Empire
- Genre: Science fiction novel
- Publisher: Baen
- Publication date: 2009
- Publication place: United States
- Media type: Print (hardback & paperback)
- Pages: 400 pp
- ISBN: 1-4165-5514-5
- Preceded by: The Final Key
- Followed by: Diamond Star

The Ruby Dice is a 2009 science fiction novel. Written by Catherine Asaro, the book wraps up many of the events of Saga of the Skolian Empire.

Two men, two empires. Jaibriol III rules the Eubian Concord: over two trillion people across more than a thousand worlds and habitats. Kelric rules the Skolian Imperialate. Ten years ago, Jaibriol lost his parents in the final battle of the Radiance War between the Concord and the Imperialate. Now war again threatens to devastate vast swathes of the galaxy.

Neither Jaibriol nor Kelric want war, but neither is complete master of his realm. And each hides a secret that, if revealed, might be his downfall. Unbeknownst to most of his people, Jaibriol is a Rhon psion with telepathic abilities. Psions are treated as slaves by the Traders in the Eubian Concord—slaves tortured for the pleasure of their owners.

Kelric hides the truth about his whereabouts for nearly two decades during the war. He had been a prisoner and slave on the planet Coba, part of neither empire, until he managed to escape. If the Skolian Imperialate knew of his captivity, demands for vengeance would ravage Coba, killing the wife and children Kelric left behind when he escaped.

Neither man knows how much longer he can keep his secret—nor how much longer they can hold back the impending war and an even greater threat that could destroy hundreds of inhabited worlds.

The latest adventure in the Skolian Empire series.

== Plot ==
Throughout the novel, the peace is contested and then established between the Skolians and the Eubian Trader Empire. Imperator Kelric Skolia, military leader of the Skolian Empire, is reunited with his children, Rohka Miesa Varz Skolia (daughter of Kelricson Valdoria and Savina Miesa) and Jimorla Haka (son of Kelricson Valdoria and Rashiva Haka), and his wife Ixpar Karn.

Imperator Kelric Skolia finds out about Emperor Jaibriol III's parentage during a meeting on Earth. He also discovers that Jaibriol III became an unspecified Key and a member of the Triad.

Kelric and Jaibriol (Jai) decide to meet on Earth in person. Kelric suspects that Jai might be a psion, but he cannot be certain unless Kelric sees him in person. Their last meeting happened almost ten years ago at the Lock that was captured by the Traders, when Kelric took on the title of the Imperator, becoming "Military Key" (see Ascendant Sun). An attempt on Kelric's life occurs, killing all of his and Jai's bodyguards. While they are stranded in the Appalachian Mountains, Kelric teaches Jai Quis, the dice game that Kelric learned on Coba during his eighteen years of living there, by linking their minds. The two leaders also sign a peace treaty that would change the fates of their empires forever.

After returning to the Skolians, the Imperator is thrown into jail since the Assembly contests his loyalty to the Skolian Imperialite because of his secret meeting with the Eubian Emperor. However, both the Traders and the Skolians ratify the treaty, making peace possible. In the novel, it is never revealed who attempted the assassinations on Kelric's life. The novel links to Catch the Lightning through the treaty, but apparently it did not work as intended, because even during the events of Catch the Lightning, both Skolia and Eubian Concord are still on shaky grounds.

=== Quis ===
Quis refers to a dice game learned by Kelric on the planet Coba.

This dice strategy game can be played with a physical set of dice that are made from hand-crafted jewels; or it can be played mentally. It originates on a planet called Coba, a former colony of the Ruby Empire that became isolated during the empire's collapses and remains so even during the time of the novels. All members of Coban society learn to play Quis, but only a few excel at it.

The Quis dice can be used for a variety of purposes, including as a game, to tell stories, to exchange information, and even to gamble. But its most important use is its influence on politics, as the dice are used to compete politically, and also can convey politically important information.

There are competing city-states that have isolated top Quis players, who study the art of playing Quis as their full-time occupation.
