= Sunrise Alley =

2004 novel by Catherine Asaro

- Author: Catherine Asaro
- Audio read by: Hillary Huber
- Genre: Romance science fiction
- Publisher: Baen Books
- Publication date: August 2004
- ISBN: 0-7434-8840-7

Sunrise Alley is a romantic science fiction novel by American author Catherine Asaro about a retired EI engineer named Samantha Bryton, and her adventures with an escaped EI who claims to be a human named Turner Pascal. The audiobook is narrated by Hillary Huber.

== Synopsis ==
After barely surviving a ship wreck, Turner and Sam set out on a series of adventures to try to discover who the mysterious "Charon" is (the former jailer of Turner) and what/where exactly "Sunrise Alley" is. Unsure of whom to trust, the characters manage a series of escapes, eventually discovering the truth behind Turner's existence and his captor. Both characters explore the notion of humanity and machine intelligence, and eventually come to blur the distinction, with the apparent realization that humanity and machine technology will inevitably merge. In the process they also fall in love.

== Similarity to Skolian Empire books ==
Some of the technology of the book is very similar to Catherine Asaro's Saga of the Skolian Empire, including elements such as Evolving Intelligence, nanomeds, biomechanical enhancements and futuristic networks called "meshes".

== Sequel ==
Alpha (2006) continues the investigations into these subjects alongside the story of two minor characters from this book, the android Alpha and Lieutenant General Thomas Wharington.
