= Schism (novel) =

2004 novel by Catherine Asaro

- Author: Catherine Asaro
- Language: English
- Series: Saga of the Skolian Empire
- Genre: Sci-fi
- Publisher: Tor Science Fiction
- Publication date: August 30, 2005
- Publication place: United States
- Media type: Print
- ISBN: 0-7653-4837-3
- OCLC: 61477936
- Preceded by: Skyfall
- Followed by: The Final Key

Schism is a novel in the Saga of the Skolian Empire, a series of science fiction books by Catherine Asaro. It was first published in 2004.

== Plot summary ==
The novel takes place about 25 years after the events in the previous novel, Skyfall. Eldrinson Valdoria and his wife Roca Skolia live happily on his homeworld Lyshriol and have ten children. Some of them have already left home, like the second oldest son Althor who is training to become a Jagernaut, or the firstborn Eldrin who at the request of the Skolian Assembly had to marry his aunt, the Ruby Pharaoh Dyhianna Selei.

The sixth of the Valdoria children, 16-year-old Sauscony (Soz), wants to enter the Military academy to become a Jagernaut like her brother. But Eldrinson has other plans – he would rather prefer to see his "little girl" living safely on Lyshriol, married to a local landlord. When she disobeys, he disowns both her (for leaving) and Althor (for taking her off-world). Though he regrets his harsh words immediately, he has no chance to take them back. Soon after, his teenage son Shannon, unhappy about the family discord, runs away from home.

The book is told from the perspective of several main characters – young Soz during her military training; Shannon searching for his lost kin, the mystic Blue Dale archers; and their father Eldrinson, being captured, crippled, and nearly tortured to death by a sadistic Aristo who infiltrated Lyshriol to destroy the Ruby Dynasty.

== Reception ==
According to Publishers Weekly "the novel's focus on emotional connections, forgiveness, love and growing up will appeal more to a female than a male sensibility. YA readers will identify with the mostly teenage protagonists. "
