= Skyfall (disambiguation) =

Skyfall is a 2012 James Bond film starring Daniel Craig.

Skyfall may also refer to:

== Music ==
- "Skyfall" (song), the theme song for the 2012 film of the same name, performed by Adele
- Skyfall, the soundtrack for the film of the same name
- "Skyfall", a 2017 song by One Ok Rock
- "Skyfall", a song by Helloween from their self-titled 2021 studio album
- "Skyfall", a song by Travis Scott featuring Young Thug from the album Days Before Rodeo

== Books ==
- Skyfall (novel), a 2004 novel by Catherine Asaro in the Saga of the Skolian Empire series
- Skyfall, a 1976 novel by Harry Harrison
- Skyfall, a 2007 novel by Anthony Eaton in the Darklands Trilogy
- Sky Fall, a series by Shannon Messenger

== Other uses ==
- SSC-X-9 Skyfall (NATO reporting name), a Russian nuclear-powered, nuclear-armed cruise missile
- Skyfall, a Transformers character
- SkyFall (helicopter), a payload on NASA's proposed Space Reactor-1 Freedom mission

== See also ==
- Spyfall (disambiguation)
- Earthfall (disambiguation)
- Rockfall
- Skyshine
