= Aurora in Four Voices =

- Short story by Catherine Asaro
- Language: English
- Genre: Science fiction

Publication
- Published in: Analog Science Fiction and Fact
- Publication type: Periodical
- Publisher: Dell Magazines
- Publication date: December 1998
- Publication place: United States
- Media type: Print (Magazine), On-line
- Series: Saga of the Skolian Empire

"Aurora in Four Voices" is a short science fiction novella written by Catherine Asaro and published in December 1998. It is part of the Skolian Empire series and was originally published in Analog Science Fiction and Fact. It was also available free online at Analog magazine's website.

It won the 1999 HOMer Award for Best Novella from the SF and Fantasy forum on CompuServe, the Analytical Laboratory (AnLab) Award for Best Novella from the readers of Analog Science Fiction and Fact, and the Sapphire Award for Best Science Fiction Romance Short Fiction for 2000 from the Science Fiction Romance Newsletter. It was also nominated for the 1999 Hugo Award for Best Novella and Nebula Award for Best Novella, the 2000 Seiun Award for best overseas short fiction by the attendees of the Japan Science Fiction Convention, and placed sixth for the 1999 Locus Award for Best Novella.

The novella also loaned its title to a collection of Asaro's short stories published by ISFiC Press in 2011.

== Plot ==
On the planet Ansatz, Jato, a man imprisoned on false charges, and Soz, a powerful fighter, meet and embark on a mission for freedom. This mission not only leads them away from Crankenshaft and his control over Jato, but also leads them close to one another.

== Characters ==
- Jato Stormson, the protagonist, grew up on a farm on the planet Sandstorm. After traveling to the planet Ansatz in hopes of performing a Trade with a Dreamer, he became a prisoner in the perpetually dark city Nightingale. Asaro describes him as having dark hair, a “...husky build and rugged good looks...”.
- Soz appears in other of Catherine Asaro's Skolian Empire works. In “Aurora in Four Voices” she is an ISC soldier with rank Imperial Messenger, Secondary Class. Her body has been modified with mechanics giving her advanced speed and strength. She arrived on Ansatz with her own spaceship, aboard which Jato hopes to be smuggled off the planet.
- Granite Crankenshaft is a Dreamer of Nightingale, whose art is “...known across a thousand star systems” and is “...a genius among geniuses...”. Crankenshaft framed Jato for murder in order to keep him in Nightingale, so that Crakenshaft could use him as a model for his masterpiece.
