= Catch the Lightning =

1997 novel by Catherine Asaro

- Author: Catherine Asaro
- Language: English
- Series: Saga of the Skolian Empire
- Genre: Science fiction
- Publisher: Tor Books
- Publication date: October 15, 1997
- Publication place: United States
- Media type: Print ()
- ISBN: 0-8125-5102-8
- OCLC: 37897649
- Preceded by: Primary Inversion
- Followed by: The Last Hawk

Catch the Lightning is a novel by Catherine Asaro in the Saga of the Skolian Empire, also known as Tales of the Ruby Dynasty. The novel won the 1998 Sapphire Award for Best Science Fiction Romance and the UTC Readers Choice Award for Best Science Fiction Novel.

== Plot overview ==
The first half of Catch the Lightning takes place in an alternate Los Angeles on Earth in a time similar to the late 20th century. The main character is Tina Pulivok, a seventeen-year-old Maya girl living in East L.A. She has relocated to Los Angeles and is living on her own while she works as a waitress. The hero, Althor Selei, a cybernetically enhanced Jag fighter pilot, is thrown into the alternate universe when his star fighter malfunctions. Tina meets Althor late at night when she is returning home from work, and he is trying to figure out why he ended up on a planet that bears little resemblance to the Earth he expected. After Althor helps Tina escape an incident of gang violence, the two become fugitives.

Tina is an empath. She is aware she is different but has no name for her abilities and is afraid to tell anyone about what she experiences. Althor is a member of the Ruby Dynasty, and as such he is heir to the throne of an interstellar empire called the Skolian Imperialate. He is also a Rhon psion and can read moods, sometimes even thoughts, from other people. He and Tina share an immediate attraction, in part based on their abilities.

During the night, while Althor stays with Tina, the Air Force discovers his Jag star ship and takes it to a military installation. Specialists there examine it, unaware that a technology-induced telepathic link ties the ship to the Jagernaut mind of its unknown (to them) pilot. As a result, they have no idea their tests are killing Althor.

With the aid of several Caltech students Tina knows, she and Althor infiltrate the military complex and regain the ship. As soon as Althor repairs its damaged systems, he and Tina return to his spacetime. They are almost immediately captured by the group that sabotaged Althor's ship, after which they are sold as slaves to his enemies, in particular an Aristo named Kryx Iquar. Althor is stunned to learn that the person who betrayed him was his close personal friend, Ragnar Bloodmark, an influential Skolian admiral who helped raise him. After being held captive and tortured for several days, Althor and Tina escape with the help of his sentient Jag fighter.

In the end, Tina marries Althor, and together they discover the origin of Althor's ancestors, the Raylicans, who were a displaced group of Maya from Earth, relocated to the planet Raylicon during an earlier era by unknown aliens.

== Context ==
Although Catch the Lightning is chronologically the last book in the series (to date), the novel was the second of Asaro's fourteen books published in The Saga of the Skolian Empire and is considered a stand-alone work. The events take place fifty years after the Radiance War, as described in The Radiant Seas.

The book is known for breaking the expectation of young adult science fiction at the time, a genre which prior to that time primarily focused on young male protagonists. In showcasing instead a young female protagonist with a romantic story line, Catch the Lightning helped open the genre to a new audience of readers. Other examples of such novels include Anne McCaffrey's Dragonriders series and the work of Lois McMaster Bujold.

Asaro uses the two-part structure of the novel to explore the clash between different cultures, a theme inherent to the genre of planetary romance as done by authors such as Ursula K. Le Guin and Marion Zimmer Bradley. The main character, Tina Pulivok, is a young woman of the Tzotzil Maya from the Zinacantan village of Nabenchauk on the Chiapas plateau in southern Mexico. Praised for the quality of her prose, Asaro builds the character's background in detail, including the use of scholarly texts and permission to include the translation of a Zincanteco poem from a Smithsonian treatise.

Tina is already experiencing the culture shock of living in Los Angeles after growing up in the Chiapas Highlands, an idea further explored in "Ave de Paso,” a short story by Asaro which appeared in Fantasy: the Best of 2001. Althor is dealing with the clash between his universe and 1980s Los Angeles, which heightens the contrast between his and Tina's backgrounds, a conflict enhanced by his cybernetic differences from a normal human being. In the second half of the novel, when Tina travels to Althor's universe and time, the differences in their backgrounds become more pronounced, and the resolution of those differences within the context of the adventure forms a prominent theme of the novel. By using alien settings to consider what it means to be different, Asaro looks at conflicts inherent in different cultures and peoples on our own world.

Other works listed as similar to Catch the Lighting are Nekropolis by Maureen F. McHugh, Brothers in Arms by Lois McMaster Bujold, Master of Intrigue by Mary Ann Steele, Venus by Ben Bova and Heart of the Betrayed by Angela Verdenius.

== Raylicon and origins of the saga ==
Catch the Lightning is the Skolian book that most features the world Raylicon, ancient home of the "lost children," those humans taken from Earth thousands of years ago and stranded on Raylicon. The mystery of why a starfaring species moved humans to a dying world and then disappeared, leaving nothing behind but the wreckage of starships, is a central question of the saga. The displaced humans eventually conquer space flight and raise the interstellar Ruby Empire. Built with only partially understood technology, it falls three centuries later, and it takes another four thousand years for the Raylicans to regain the stars. (The Radiant Seas, 1999) During that time, the colonies on other worlds are stranded, and those that survive lose their technology, becoming lost worlds. Raylicon is the culture that survives, and in modern times the mysterious ruins of the Ruby Empire exist side by side with the modern cities of the Skolian Imperialate. The chapters set on Raylicon, which come late in the book, offer the most detail in the saga about the culture and history of world that originated both the Skolians and their enemies, the Eubian Concord, aka the Trader Empire.

== Mathematical and physical themes ==
Asaro, a theoretical physicist, frames the science fictional elements of the story with mathematical concepts. The alternate universe Althor slips into when his ship malfunctions is a fictional extrapolation of Riemann sheets and branch points from complex analysis. The concepts derive from an extension of special relativity into the complex plane, as described in a paper Asaro published in the American Journal of Physics. She also uses concepts of Hilbert spaces in sequences of Catch the Lighting, as detailed in the essay at the end of her book Spherical Harmonic.

Asaro's Nebula Award winning novella "The Spacetime Pool" further uses the ideas of Riemann sheets and branch points to structure the story.

== Genre splitting ==
As with several of Asaro's other works, Catch the Lightning has stirred both praise and controversy due to its mix of romance with hard science fiction. The book won the Sapphire Award for best Science Fiction Romance of 1998 and has been described as an example of the best in science fiction romance literature, along with works by Lois McMaster Bujold, Robin McKinley, Sharon Shinn, Patricia C. Wrede and Caroline Stevermer, Emma Bull, Mercedes Lackey, Anne McCaffrey, Barbara Hambly, Joanne Bertin, Patricia Briggs, Patricia A. McKillip, Lisanne Norman and Elizabeth Marie Pope.

Asaro has been accepting of the term romance despite the controversy and has expressed pleased surprise that her works attracted the interest of the romance community.
