= Moonshadow =

Moonshadow or Moon Shadow may refer to:

- "Moonshadow" (song), a song by Cat Stevens
- Moonshadows Malibu, an iconic restaurant along the Pacific Coast Highway destroyed by a Palisades Fire
- "Moon Shadow", a song by English folk singer Kate Rusby from her 2005 album The Girl Who Couldn't Fly (unrelated to the Cat Stevens song)
- Moon Shadow, the birth name of musician and professional wrestler Goldy Locks.
- Moon Shadow, a character from the children's novel Dragonwings
- Moon Shadow, A.K.A. Tyler Marlocke, the protagonist in the comic book series PS238
- Moonshadow (comics), a graphic novel by J. M. DeMatteis
- Moon Shadow (album), an album by Labelle
- The Moon's Shadow, a 2003 novel by Catherine Asaro
- Moonshadow, a 1982 novel by Angela Carter
- Moon Shadow, name in U.S. market for the film Colpo di luna
- Moonshadow (TV series), a Thai girls' love television series

== See also ==
- "Moonlight Shadow", song by Mike Oldfield
- "Moonshadows", 1976 album by Alphonso Johnson
