= Diamond Star =

Diamond Star may refer to:

- Diamond-Star Motors (DSM), an automobile-manufacturing joint-venture
- Diamond DA40 (Diamond Star), an aircraft
- Diamond DA42 (Diamond Twin Star), an aircraft
- Diamond DA50 (Diamond Super Star), an aircraft
- Diamond Star, Arizona, original name of Star Valley, a town in Gila County, Arizona, United States
- BPM 37093 (V886 Centauri), a variable white dwarf star with a core of crystallized carbon
- Title of a CD by Point Valid
- Maricel Soriano, Filipino actress known as "The Diamond Star"
- Srinagara Kitty (born 1977), Indian actor, nicknamed "Diamond Star"

== See also ==
- Earth Star Diamond
