= Nebula Awards Showcase 2003 =

2003 anthology edited by Nancy Kress

- Cover of first edition
- Editor: Nancy Kress
- Cover artist: David Sandberg
- Language: English
- Series: Nebula Awards Showcase
- Genre: Science fiction
- Publisher: Roc/New American Library
- Publication date: 2003
- Publication place: United States
- Media type: Print (paperback)
- Pages: 231
- ISBN: 0-451-45909-1
- Preceded by: Nebula Awards Showcase 2002
- Followed by: Nebula Awards Showcase 2004

Nebula Awards Showcase 2003 is an anthology of science fiction short works edited by Nancy Kress. It was first published in trade paperback by Roc/New American Library in April 2003.

== Summary ==
The book collects pieces that won or were nominated for the Nebula Awards for best novel, novella, novelette and short story for the year 2002, various other nonfiction pieces related to the awards, and the two Rhysling Award-winning poems for 2001, together with an introduction by the editor. Not all nominees for the various awards are included, and the best novel is represented by an excerpt.

== Contents ==
- "Introduction: Entering the Field" (Nancy Kress)
- "The 2001 Nebula Awards Ballot"
- "The Cure for Everything" [Best Short Story winner, 2002] (Severna Park)
- "The Ultimate Earth" [Best Novella winner, 2002] (Jack Williamson)
- "Betty Ballantine Appreciation" [essay] (Shelly Shapiro)
- "Louise's Ghost" [Best Novelette winner, 2002] (Kelly Link)
- "Undone" [Best Novelette nominee, 2002] (James Patrick Kelly)
- "Rhysling Winners" [poetry]
  - "My Wife Returns As She Would Have It" [Rhysling Award for Short Poem winner, 2001] (Bruce Boston)
  - "January Fires" [Rhysling Award for Long Poem winner, 2001] (Joe Haldeman)
- "The Elephants on Neptune" [Best Short Story nominee, 2002] (Mike Resnick)
- "Commentary: Joys and Jeremiads" [essays]
  - "Hard Science Fiction" (Geoffrey A. Landis)
  - "Soft- and Medium-Viscosity Science Fiction" (Scott Edelman)
  - "SF Humor: a Look at the Numbers" (Terry Bisson)
  - "Contemporary Fantasy" (Andy Duncan)
  - "Traditional Fantasy" (Mindy L. Klasky)
  - "Dark Fantasy" (Ellen Datlow)
  - "Alternate History" (Harry Turtledove)
  - "Film and Television" (Michael Cassutt)
- "From The Quantum Rose" (excerpt) [Best Novel winner, 2002] (Catherine Asaro)
- "Past Nebula Award Winners"

== Reception ==
The reviewer for Publishers Weekly, while nothing that "it's good to have the Nebula winners for a given year gathered in one place," questions "whether there's enough content here to justify such a book," answering "[o]n balance, ... yes, if only because of the unlikely juxtapositions," and concluding that "[i]n short, the variety of taste shown by the SFFWA continues to be striking and heartening." The critic feels, however, that "[t]his anthology series is finding a niche for itself by not competing with the two major best-of-the-year collections--Gardner Dozois's mammoth assembly that favors literary experimentation and David Hartwell's relatively compact selection of more traditional SF. Still, the two big anthologies are better bargains."

Roland Green, writing in Booklist, rates the book "[a]s always, an honorable entry among the year’s anthologies. He notes that "[i]n this year’s selection, the short fiction often uses biology for scientific grounding," but singles out the non-fiction offerings for praise: "Terry Bisson’s essay on making a living with humorous fantasy is itself a humorous fantasy, and the other essayists on fantasy assimilate the boom in fantasy in both print and visual media." As the end of his assessment, the journal's young adult reviewer calls the book "a terrific collection for genre fans and YAs new to sf."

The anthology was also reviewed by Sandra Lindow in SFRA Review #263-4, Gary K. Wolfe in Locus, #507, April 2003, and Patrick J. Swenson in Talebones #26, Summer 2003.
