= The Moon's Shadow =

2003 novel by Catherine Asaro

- Author: Catherine Asaro
- Language: English
- Series: Saga of the Skolian Empire
- Genre: Science fiction
- Publisher: Tor Books
- Publication date: March 2003
- Publication place: United States
- Media type: softcover
- Pages: 480
- ISBN: 978-0-7653-0425-4
- Preceded by: Spherical Harmonic
- Followed by: Diamond Star

The Moon's Shadow is a novel from the Saga of the Skolian Empire by Catherine Asaro which tells the story of Jaibriol Qox III—how he became emperor of Eube after the interstellar Radiance War, and founded peace talks between his people, the Eubians, and those of the Skolian Imperialate.

== Synopsis ==
After ascending the Carnelian throne, 17-year-old Eubian Emperor Jaibriol III is busy accomplishing many different goals—beginning peace talks with Skolian Imperialate, escaping death during several assassination attempts and marrying his beautiful, tricky and dangerous finance minister Tarquine Iquar. Above all, he has to hide from his Aristo fellows that he is, in fact, a Rhon psion, for if his secret is ever revealed he would face the fate of an enslaved provider.

This novel overlaps with Ascendant Sun which tells the events after Radiance War from the point of view of new Skolian Imperator Kelric Valdoria and Spherical Harmonic which tells the events after Radiance War from the point of view of Pharaoh Dyhianna Selei. The Radiant Seas tells the story of Jaibriol's childhood on the planet Prizma and the course of Radiance War. "The Ruby Dice" is the next book in the chronology of the saga to include Jaibriol III as a main character, followed by "Carnelians".
