= The Cure for Everything =

"The Cure for Everything" is a science fiction short story by American writer Severna Park. It won the 2001 Nebula Award for Best Short Story. It is included in the Nebula Awards Showcase 2003.

== Story ==
The story follows Maria, an African albino woman who runs the Xingu Indian Assimilation Center with her boss Horace. One day a truck shows up with the label on the side: "The Hiller Project." One of the men from the truck, N'Lykli, says that he needs to move one of the tribes housed there to Xavantina. Horace demands authorization. N'Lykli tells Maria that this tribe is unique in that it has been inbred for five centuries, containing a genetic mutation with the cures for any congenital disease, including Lucknow's Syndrome, which caused her albinism and infertility. He mentions one lady who is one hundred years old and still very healthy, and another, known as The Cure for Everything, who could be the source of a hundred new vaccines. Maria convinces her boss to let them take tribe away. That night, she visits the tribe to see if N'Lykli had been lying. She saw the old woman that he had spoken of, and The Cure for Everything. When she saw him, he pleaded with her to take him away. She let the trucks depart to take the tribe to Xavantina, but quickly regretted the decision. When she reached the compound, she found out that the Cure had been the only member of the tribe who preferred freedom over the safety that the compound provided. Maria left the compound with The Cure in her Jeep, mutually deciding wherever they go, they cannot go back to Xingu.
