= Skyfall (novel) =

2003 novel by Catherine Asaro

- Author: Catherine Asaro
- Cover artist: Luis Royo
- Language: English
- Genre: Sci-fi
- Publisher: Tor Books
- Publication date: September 2003
- Publication place: United States
- Media type: Print, e-book
- ISBN: 0-7653-4557-9
- OCLC: 56696537
- Preceded by: The Moon's Shadow
- Followed by: Schism

Skyfall is a 2003 novel by Catherine Asaro which tells the story of how Roca met her husband Eldrinson, Bard of Dalvador, ruler of a province on Skyfall.

== Overview ==
The novel won Third Place Sapphire Award for Best Science Fiction Romance Novel of 2004 from the Science Fiction Romance Newsletter. It was also the first science fiction novel from a science fiction publisher to be nominated for the RITA Award.

Skyfall also refers to the name of the planet where the story takes place - the name given to the planet by the Allieds. In the local language, the planet is called Lyshriol.

== Plot summary ==
It is a turbulent time for the Skolian Empire. Kurj is trying to lead his people into war with the Traders, a more massive empire. He uses his powerful connections to control his mother who is attempting to sway the Assembly otherwise. The book begins with Roca, in hiding, trying to get to the Assembly meeting. During her voyage, she ends up stranded on a planet known as Skyfall. There, on a planet once part of the Ruby Empire but now antiquated in its technology, she meets Eldrinson Valdoria, and due to extreme weather and lack of incoming ships, she is stranded there for approximately one year. During that time she falls in love with Eldrinson and becomes pregnant.

The novel also periodically shifts to describe the perspective of Kurj, a Primary (top ranking) Jagernaut (most feared warriors of the Skolian Empire) and grandson of the ruling couple of Skolian Empire, Pharaoh Lahaylia and Imperator Jarac. Kurj is obsessed with stopping the slave-driven empire of the Traders. But when his mother escapes his clutches, he fears the worst, and spends much of the novel obsessing over finding her instead. We also learn of some of the horrors from his past, giving meaning to his stoic nature.

Back on the planet of Skyfall, Roca and her new husband come under siege by a rival who claims the title that Eldrinson possesses. At the point of his final breach into the castle, Kurj arrives with his much superior technology, and ceases hostilities. Roca gives birth to her child which she names Eldrin.

The remainder of the novel revolves around the forced separation of Eldrinson from Roca and his child.

== Reception ==
Publishers Weekly noted that the lack of heavy physics might disappoint Asaro's science fiction fans however, the "romance readers will have no cause to complain." SF Site wrote: "Not many authors are able to mix up such an emotional and dangerous blend with genuine science fiction, but Asaro handles it with ease."
