= Point Valid =

American alternative rock band

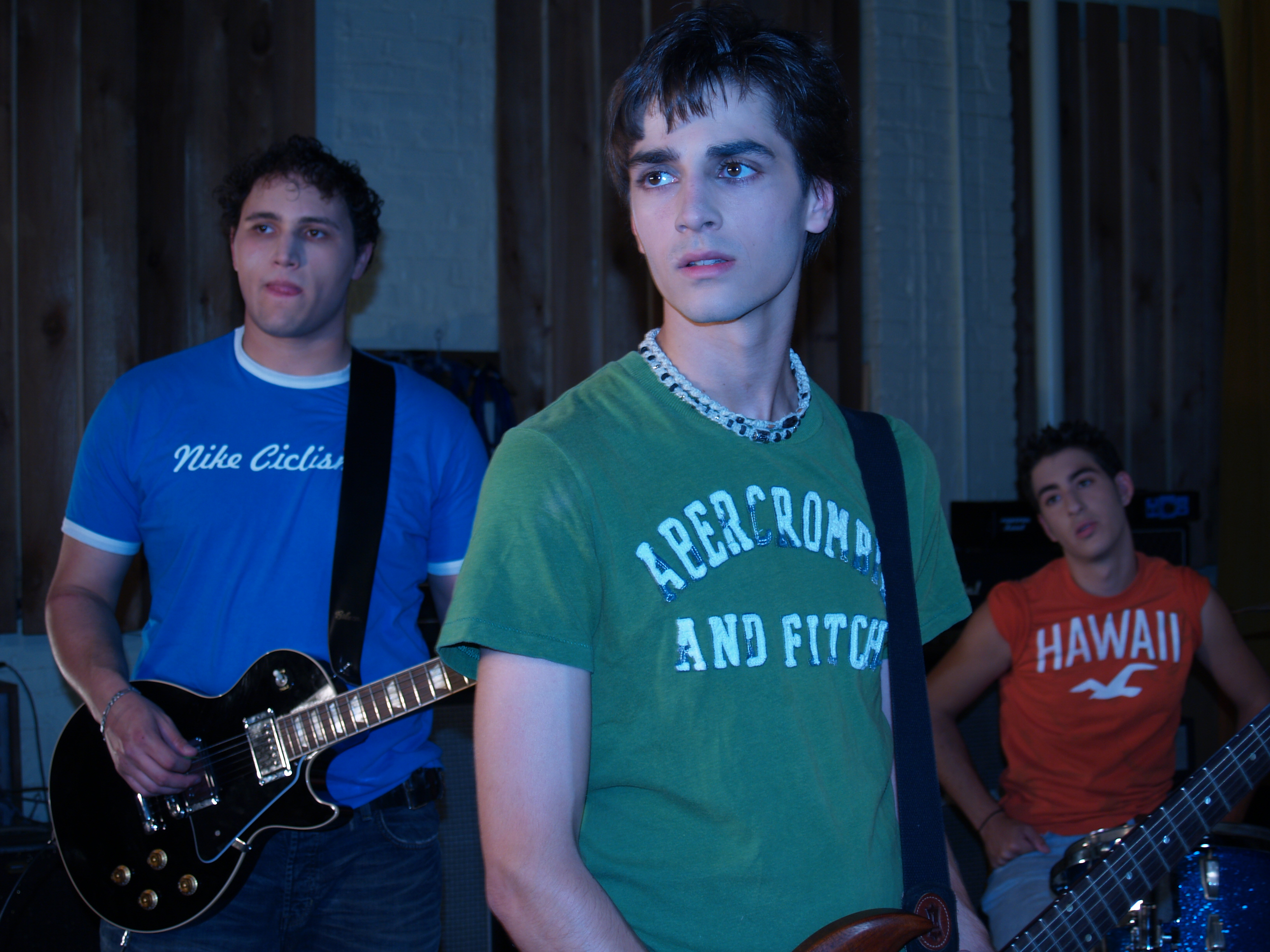
- From left to right: Max Vidaver, Hayim Ani, Adam Leve

Background information
- Origin: Baltimore, Maryland
- Genres: Alternative rock
- Years active: 2006-2011
- Labels: Starflight Music
- Past members: Hayim Ani (vocals and guitar); Max Vidaver (guitar); Adam Leve (drums); David Michelsohn (bass)

Point Valid was a three-piece alternative rock band originating in Baltimore, Maryland. The group formed in October 2006, and went on hiatus in 2011. While active, the band collaborated with American science fiction and fantasy author Catherine Asaro.

== History ==
=== Origins and formation ===
Adam Leve (drums) and David Michelsohn (bass) formed a band which they named Fashionably Late in 2006 and recruited Max Vidaver to play guitar. After Ani joined them for their first show, a battle of the bands in Baltimore, they decided to keep him as their vocalist and renamed the band Point Valid. Ani soon expanded his contributions to playing lead guitar and writing original material. The group performed at various venues in the Baltimore area, including the Recher Theatre in Towson and went on to record a demo EP which served as a stepping stone to their debut CD.

=== Début album ===
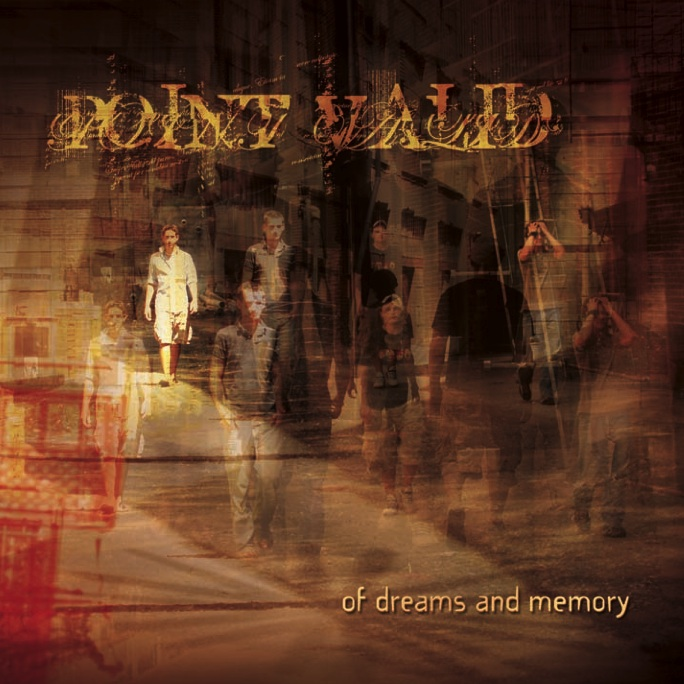
Of Dreams and Memory CD Cover

In the summer of 2007, the band self-produced a conceptual album titled Of Dreams and Memory at Invisible Sound Studios in downtown Baltimore. Just days before the band's first studio session, a friend of theirs was killed in a car crash. After attending her funeral, the band dedicated the nine-track album in her memory. The CD follows the story of a confused, love-struck boy who exists in a world of chaos and tries to find solace from "the storm clouds" of life. While on his journey, he learns about love, the nature of humanity and his own feelings. By the end of the CD, he has come to terms with his existence and realizes storms are a natural part of life and everything will all right so long as he has someone to hold on to. The story of the album is divided by three instrumental pieces (Ballad, Interlude and The End of Nothing) each representing a different chapter in the character's life. The CD's songs are in the alternative genre and range from hard rock to melodic ballads.

=== The Diamond Star Project ===
Diamond Star CD cover

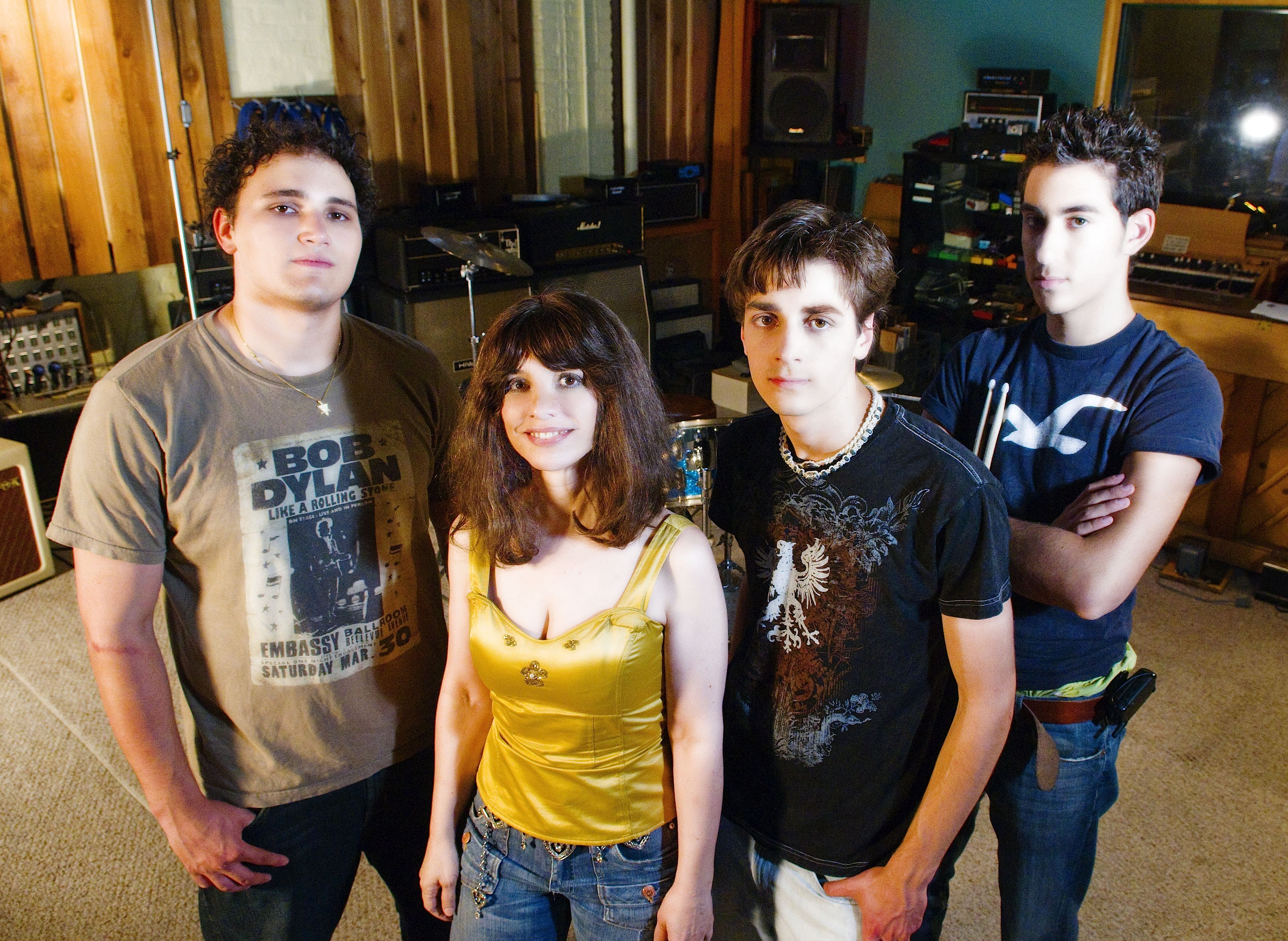
Point Valid posing with Catherine Asaro

The Diamond Star Project is a collaboration between Point Valid and author Catherine Asaro, whose works include the science fiction Saga of the Skolian Empire series. The project resulted in Point Valid's second CD, Diamond Star (Starflight Music, April 2009), which is a "soundtrack" for Asaro's book Diamond Star (Baen Books, May 2009). The novel tells the story of Del-Kurj, a Ruby Dynasty prince who would rather be a rock singer than sit on the throne. The lyrics to the songs appear in the novel Diamond Star and were the inspiration for the CD.

Ani wrote most of the music for the CD, working with Point Valid, and Asaro wrote most of the lyrics, as well as music for three songs. Ani also contributed three original compositions, both music and lyrics. Most of the vocals are by Ani, with a few by Asaro. Although David Michelsohn was no longer an official member of the band, he continued as a guest artist for several cuts on the album. Dave Nachodsky, the recording engineer at Invisible Sound Studios and co-producer on the CD, played bass on many of the other cuts. The band also brought in a number of other guest artists to do instrumental solos or backup vocals.

The CD has twelve songs: eleven originals and a cover of "Sound of Silence." It also includes a bonus track, which is an instrumental version of the twelfth song with no vocals, in keeping with the two versions of the song in the book. The cuts are melodic alternative rock with influences from symphonic metal, classic rock, and Bach. Asaro, who did not know how to sing, took voice lessons in preparation for the recordings and continues to train. In 2009, the Diamond Star Project expanded to include jazz pianist Donald Wolcott, who accompanies Asaro in concerts. In 2011, pianist Greg Adams replaced Wolcott as Asaro's primary accompanist.

=== 2011-present ===
The band Point Valid went on hiatus after the production of Diamond Star. In 2011, Hayim Ani embarked on a solo career in Israel with the video "Whisper of the Trees." His 2013 single "Before We Drown" featured Adam Leve from Point Valid. In 2014, together with Shira Laurence, Hayim Ani helped to create "The One Song Project" of Jerusalem-based musicians. The purpose of The One Song Project is to promote diversity of musical expression and independent art culture in the city of Jerusalem.

== Discography ==
- EP (2006)
- Of Dreams and Memory (2007)
- Diamond Star (2009)
- Whisper of the Trees (performing as eZra) (2011)
- Subtle Notes (eZra) (2012)
- Before We Drown (eZra, featuring Adam Leve) (2013)
- If You Ask, (Ella and eZra, featuring Shayna) (2015)
