= Spyfall =

"Spyfall" may refer to:

- Spyfall (card game), a card game published by Hobby World
- "Spyfall" (Doctor Who), a two-part episode of the twelfth series of Doctor Who

== See also ==
- Skyfall (disambiguation)
