= Earthfall =

Earthfall may refer to:

- Earthfall (novel), a science fiction novel by American writer Orson Scott Card
- Earthfall (video game), a 4-player cooperative first-person shooter video game
- Earthfall (film) , a 2015 Amazon Prime Video Sci-Fi movie

== See also ==
- Earth4All
- Skyfall (disambiguation)
