= The Last Hawk =

Book by Catherine Asaro

- Cover of first edition (hardcover)
- Author: Catherine Asaro
- Language: English
- Series: Saga of the Skolian Empire
- Genre: Science fiction novel
- Publisher: Tor Books
- Publication date: 1997
- Publication place: United States
- Media type: Print (hardback & paperback)
- Pages: 448 pp
- ISBN: 0-312-86044-7
- OCLC: 36884387
- Dewey Decimal: 813/.54 21
- LC Class: PS3551.S29 L37 1997
- Preceded by: Catch the Lightning
- Followed by: Ascendant Sun

The Last Hawk is a 1997 science fiction novel by Catherine Asaro. The novel is an installment in the Saga of the Skolian Empire series and details the life of Kelricson Garlin Valdoria Skolia during his eighteen years of imprisonment on the planet Coba

It was nominated for the Nebula Award for Best Novel in 1998.

== Plot ==
The novel opens when Kelric Valdoria crash lands on the planet Coba. An ancient culture with similarities to the Raylicans, Coba is one of the many isolated and forgotten planets of the former Ruby Empire. Kelric makes several unsuccessful attempts to escape and eventually ends up in jail. It is there he spends his time (particularly while in isolation) learning the dice game Quis.

Eventually, Kelric is released and joins one of the "estates" - small matriarchical provinces or city-states that comprise the population of Coba. These estates have special dedicated communes that exclusively play Quis, called Calanya. Kelric becomes a member of one of these communes, known as the "Calani". The society of Coba has, for centuries, replaced war and aggression with competition in Quis. The Quis also double as an information network, with players revealing information about themselves and their estate while at the same time learn about others. Finally, as an information-exchange network, Quis allows technology to improve on Coba at an astounding rate.

The strength of a Calani is based on two properties: a player's skill, and the number of different estates they have worked for. Because of his pleasing appearance and his skill in Quis, Kelric is coveted by the queens (known as "Managers") of the different estates. Kelric's membership in the estates proceeds as follows: Dahl, Haka, Bahvla, Miesa, Varz, and finally Karn. Renamed "Sevtar", Kelric has two children with two of his wives (one of which is born Rhon) during his time in the different estates.

Each time Kelric is traded, his skill and worth increase, in the end reaching legendary status. In the final trade to Karn, Ixpar Karn trades rule of the planet (in addition to being Karn Manager, Ixpar also held the title of "Minister" of Coba) for Kelric. This eventually ignites actual violence, allowing Kelric to escape.

The end of this novel is where Ascendant Sun begins.

=== Quis ===
Quis refers to a dice game learned by Kelric on the planet Coba.

This dice strategy game can be played with a physical set of dice that are made from hand-crafted jewels; or it can be played mentally. It originates on a planet called Coba, a former colony of the Ruby Empire that became isolated during the empire's collapses and remains so even during the time of the novels. All members of Coban society learn to play Quis, but only a few excel at it.

The Quis dice can be used for a variety of purposes, including as a game, to tell stories, to exchange information, and even to gamble. But its most important use is its influence on politics, as the dice are used to compete politically, and also can convey politically important information.

There are competing city-states that have isolated top Quis players, who study the art of playing Quis as their full-time occupation.

== Reception ==
While Kirkus reviewed the book as "[i]ndependently intelligible but likely to appeal most to existing fans", Publishers Weekly pointed out that it was "[l]ess touchy-feely than Asaro's first novel" and that it "packs in lots of action along with its many romantic interludes and diversions into speculative genetics."
