= Primary Inversion =

1995 science fiction novel by Catherine Asaro

- First edition cover
- Author: Catherine Asaro
- Cover artist: Ron Walotsky
- Language: English
- Series: Saga of the Skolian Empire
- Genre: science fiction
- Publisher: Tor Books
- Publication date: 1995
- Publication place: United States
- Media type: Print
- ISBN: 0-8125-5023-4
- OCLC: 34794832
- Followed by: Catch the Lightning

Primary Inversion is a science fiction novel in the Saga of the Skolian Empire by Catherine Asaro. As Asaro's debut novel, it first appeared as a hardcover in 1995. It was nominated for the 1996 Compton Crook/Stephen Tall Memorial Award and placed tenth on the list for the Locus Award for Best First Novel.

== Synopsis ==
Primary Inversion is set in a future where three star-faring civilizations vie for control of human-settled space. Fighter pilot Sauscony (Soz) Valdoria commands a squadron of four Jagernaut pilots, neurologically enhanced empaths who have been bio-engineered as weapons. Jagernauts have extensive biomech throughout their bodies, allowing for enhanced speed and reaction, and an embedded evolving intelligence (EI) in their spinal cords. They are pitted against the legions of the Trader empire, in particular the Aristo ruling class, a race that derives pleasure from the amplified pain and anguish of empaths—especially Jagernauts, as Soz knows from personal experience. Soz is also an imperial heir and may someday become the military commander of the Skolian Empire, the bitter enemies of the Traders.

The book is divided into three sections. In the first, Soz and her squadron are taking shore leave on a planet that has remained neutral in the hostilities between the warring empires. It is there that Soz meets the Highton heir, Jaibriol Qox the Second, the Aristo who will someday rule the Trader empire. She discovers he secretly possesses the same empathic abilities that she wields. The two link mentally and fall in love against their own wishes. From Jaibriol, Soz learns that his father is going to commit genocide against the inhabitants of a planet who have joined together to rebel against their Aristo rulers. She goes in with her squadron to warn and evacuate the planet. After a desperate space battle, they barely escape with their own lives, but are able to save some of the planet's inhabitants.

In the second section, Soz is sent by her brother, Kurj, the imperator of the Skolian Imperialate, for rest and recuperation on the planet Foreshires Hold. Emotionally drained and suffering from post traumatic syndrome, she refuses to acknowledge she needs help. She wants to fight the Traders, to avenge Rex, her second in command and long time friend, who was crippled in the battle. Her condition continues to deteriorate, until she almost shoots herself with her own gun. Finally acknowledging she needs help, she seeks the counsel of a heartbender, a psychologist specifically trained to treat Jagernauts.

In part three, Soz's brother calls her back to HQ. He has captured Jaibriol Qox and wants Soz to interrogate him. Knowing that if her brother discovers her secret meeting with Jaibriol, he will probably have her executed for treason, Soz undertakes a daring rescue and frees Jaibriol. With the help of her stunned father Eldrinson, she and Jaibriol escape in a star ship accident that appears to kill them both. They hide on an isolated planet, with only Soz's father and the president of the Allied Worlds of Earth aware of their true situation. The book ends with their knowledge that they will someday have to return to deal with their respective empires, but for the time being they are safe.

== Place in the series ==
Primary Inversion is the first book of the Skolian Empire series that appeared in print, and is considered a stand-alone novel. However, the events that take place in the book are placed in the middle of the series chronology. In 2008, Asaro rewrote the entire book and gave the revised version to the Baen Free Library to post. The sequel to Primary Inversion is The Radiant Seas, which continues the story of Soz, Jaibriol, and Kurj and is written as an epic space saga covering nearly twenty years.

== Sauscony (Soz) Valdoria ==
Soz Valdoria has been among Asaro's most popular characters. A portion of Primary Inversion is devoted to Soz's attempts to deal with the emotional repercussions of being both a highly sensitive empath and an advanced military weapon. In that guise, the story deals with themes of post traumatic stress syndrome. James Schellenberg at Challenging Destiny Reviews has noted that Asaro "understands one of Roger Ebert's dictums about what makes for interesting drama, namely that it's not what we do, but how we feel when we're doing it", and that Soz is "a strong, dynamic character, one that people of either gender can easily identify with. However, Sauscony is not a one-note monolith of fortitude and brawn—she is articulate, funny, and empathic to boot." Asaro uses the character to highlight questions of humanity in asking what happens to soldiers who are turned into weapons. And in dealing with role reversal in Primary Inversion, she explores traditional gender roles in the process of breaking them.

== Elements of science fiction ==
Primary Inversion has been described as an exemplary novel in the hard science fiction genre from sources such as Stanley Schmidt, the long time editor of Analog magazine, who wrote that the book is "an impressive first novel; not just a good story, but the kind of speculation we too seldom see—really new science that just might be possible". Asaro is also noted as one of the few female science fiction writers who also has a doctorate in hard science, specifically a Ph.D. from Harvard in theoretical Chemical Physics.

In 1996, Asaro published a paper in the American Journal of Physics called "Complex Speeds and Special Relativity" that gives the mathematical formulation she developed for the fictional star drive used in Primary Inversion. Describing the idea as a "mathematical game", she shows how making the speed a complex number can remove the problems associated with the singularity at the speed of light.

"Inversion" is the means of faster-than-light space travel. Instead of breaking the barrier of the speed of light, spaceships in Primary Inversion go around it. By adding an imaginary component to their velocity, or "inverting", they enter a superluminal universe, allowing for near-instantaneous travel. However, because the ship must come close to the speed of light to invert, travel still takes time. In addition, various space-time calculation errors add complications. The Skolians' military advantage is based on the fact that the pilots can communicate with technology-induced "telepathy" while in inversion and arrive in tight formation from inversion.

Primary Inversion and its sequel, The Radiant Seas, deal with interstellar combat from the perspective of relativistic space travel. The battles in Primary Inversion and other of Asaro's works include extrapolations of current-day ideas in bio-cybernetics, artificial intelligence, situational awareness, relativistic complications, and weapons development. Reviewers have commented on the extent and excitement of the battles, and also the attention to detail.

The presence of empathy (in Rhon) and anti-empathy/sadism (in Aristo) is explained by two extraneous structures in the brain, KEB and Kyle Afferent Body (KAB). The first sends out signals of emotions, while the second interprets them. The Aristos were genetically engineered for resistance to pain, and the structure that is supposed to interpret telepathic signals is defective. They do not interpret emotions as such, instead they receive only emotional signals of pain, which their brains re-route to the sexual pleasure centers. The perfect prey for Aristos are the empaths, since the empath sends out stronger pain emotions, which translates into greatest pleasure.

The Skolian Kyle Web or psiberweb can be used by telepaths as a means for instantaneous communication and for information storage. It is based on ancient technology of the Ruby Empire and powered by the Triad of Rhon empaths, strongest empaths there are. Without the Rhon, the Web would collapse.

== Matriarchy ==
The Skolian Empire is based on the remnants of the more powerful, ancient Ruby Empire, which was a true matriarchy. Physically, the women were taller and bigger than men. In many descriptions of women in her book, Asaro compares them to the "ancient warrior queens." Although the society is currently egalitarian, and the Imperator is male, remnants of matriarchy remain.

The main character, Sauscony Valdoria is a warrior, a Jagernaut (biomechanically enhanced fighter and pilot) with the rank of a Primary (military status equivalent to general) and very tough. She admits to being bad with words and emotions, she suppresses her feelings and hides her weaknesses. She is much more comfortable with physical rather than emotional confrontation. In her relationship with Jaibriol Qox, she also takes the dominant role. She is more than twice his age, more experienced and powerful. When he is captured, she rescues and more-or-less physically carries him out of his cell.

== Place in genre and associated controversies ==
Described as "an unusually masterful first novel" by Booklist, Primary Inversion has been called hard science fiction, action-rich drama, space opera, military science fiction, science fiction romance, and space adventure. The book has received praise both for Asaro's development of the emotional lives of the characters and for its innovative use of scientific extrapolation. In an interview at Intel's Moments of Genius web site, Asaro describes how her publisher introduced her books as hard science fiction and how she uses her doctorate in theoretical physics as background for her fiction.

The label assigned to the book has become a source of controversy, in particular due to the blend of hard science with romance in the Romeo and Juliet tale of love between the scions of two empires. Some romance readers have said the book doesn't qualify as romance because it is, first and foremost, a story that emphasizes science fiction, one where the two lovers are separated for a third of the book; whereas some science fiction readers have criticized the extent of the development of the love relationship and emotional lives of the characters.

Asaro has been accepting of the term romance despite the controversy and has expressed pleased surprise that her works attracted the interest of the romance community.
