= The Quantum Rose =

2000 novel by Catherine Asaro

- Cover of first edition (hardcover)
- Author: Catherine Asaro
- Cover artist: Julie Bell
- Language: English
- Series: Saga of the Skolian Empire
- Genre: Science fiction novel
- Publisher: Tor Books (2000) and Analog Science Fiction and Fact (1999)
- Publication date: 2000
- Publication place: United States
- Media type: Print (hardback & paperback)
- Pages: 382
- ISBN: 0-312-89062-1
- OCLC: 44313395
- Dewey Decimal: 813/.54 21
- LC Class: PS3551.S29 Q36 2000

The Quantum Rose is a science fiction novel by Catherine Asaro which tells the story of Kamoj Argali and Skolian Prince Havyrl Valdoria. The book is situated within Asaro's Saga of the Skolian Empire series. The Quantum Rose won the 2001 Nebula Award for Best Novel and the 2001 Affaire de Coeur Award for Best Science Fiction. Additionally, it received the Romantic Times Reviewers choice award for best science fiction novel. The first third of the novel appeared as a three-part serialization in Analog magazine in the 1999 May, June, and July/August issues. In 2000, Tor Books published the novel in its entirety. In 2003, an excerpt from the novel appeared in Nebula Awards Showcase 2003 anthology.

== Plot summary ==
The Quantum Rose is a retelling of the French folktale, Beauty and the Beast by Gabrielle-Suzanne Barbot de Villeneuve, in a science fiction setting. Kamoj Argali, the governor of an impoverished province on the backward planet Balumil, is betrothed to Jax Ironbridge, ruler of a wealthy neighboring province. This arrangement was made for political purposes in order to save her province from starvation and death. Havyrl, Vyrl, Lionstar is a prince of the titular Ruby Dynasty who comes to Balimul as part of a governmental plan to deal with the aftermath of an interstellar war. Masked and enigmatic, he has a reputation as a monster with Kamoj's people.

Vyrl interferes with Kamoj's culture and destabilizes their government by pushing her into marriage with himself. Themes surrounding the physical and emotional scars left on the survivors of a war with no clear victor are prevalent throughout this storyline. As such, it is also a story of healing for the characters Kamoj and Lionstar.

The second half of The Quantum Rose involves Lionstar's return to his home world with Kamoj, where he becomes the central figure in a planet wide act of civil disobedience designed to eject an occupying military force that has taken control of his planet. Both the world Balimul in the first half of the novel and the world Lyshriol in the second half fall into the lost colony genre of literature in science fiction.

== Context ==
The Quantum Rose is an allegory to the mathematical and physical processes of coupled-channel quantum scattering theory and as such is based on Asaro's doctoral work in chemical physics, with thesis advisor Alexander Dalgarno at the Harvard Smithsonian Center for Astrophysics. Asaro describes the allegory in an essay at the end of the book and explains how the characters and plot points play the roles of mathematical terms or processes in atomic and molecular physics. Each chapter of the book has a main poetic title, and then a subtitle which refers to the aspect of scattering theory highlighted in that chapter. In an interview with The Hachiko, Asaro describes how she used the provocative nature of some scientific terminology to evoke conflicts dealt with in the book, such as the tensions between capture and freedom. She discusses some of her inspiration for the book in "Moments of Genius," an interview at the Intel Big Think website.

This book overlaps with Spherical Harmonic, which tells the story of Ruby Pharaoh and her attempts to regain her title after the devastating Radiance War.

== Reception ==
Locus reviewer Jennifer Hall received the novel favorably, saying "The writing is strong and the plot and characters engaging, and [Asaro] hold[s] it all together with a complexity of situations, scientific marvels, and loads of intrigue."

Jeri Wright, in a Featured Review for SF Site, gave a highly favorable review of the book, calling it "thought-provoking, entertaining, and very, very enjoyable", and commending Asaro for her "interesting scientific and cultural speculation".

Jeff Zaleski, from Publishers Weekly, dubbed the book "a freestanding page-turner as a romance, with a hard science framework."

== Comparison to Beauty and the Beast ==
Both narratives involve relationships catalyzed by the desire of the female to save individuals of significance to her. In Beauty and the Beast, Beauty becomes the Beast's prisoner in order to free her father and similarly, in The Quantum Rose, governor Kamoj Argali is initially betrothed to ruler Jax Ironbridge in order to save her people from starvation. While the circumstances surrounding the relationships are similar, the relationships themselves are different; in Beauty and the Beast, Beauty is not betrothed to another man like she is to Jax in The Quantum Rose. Furthermore, in the traditional fairy tale, Beauty chooses save her father by staying with the prince transformed into a beast; in The Quantum Rose, Kamoj must save her province from the prince in exile who forces her into a relationship.

Themes of beastliness alongside beauty are present in both stories. The juxtaposition between traditionally desirable character traits in Beauty and Kamoj, with the arguably immoral qualities attributed to the Beast and Vyrl, are another point of synthesis connecting the tales. But, while Beast in Beauty and the Beast is such in the literal and figurative sense, in The Quantum Rose, Vyrl is perceived as a beast due to his behavior rather than his physical nature.

Another notable point of comparison between the original and its science fiction adaptation is the difference in position within society between Kamoj and Vyrl as opposed to that of the couple in Beauty and Beast. In The Quantum Rose, both parties hold positions of power in their respective communities; and like the classic fairytale, positions the male in the relationship as royalty. The tales diverge in terms of the positions in society held by the women in the pairings. In Beauty and the Beast, Beauty is a peasant while in The Quantum Rose, Kamoj is a governor.

== Other science fiction adaptations of Beauty and the Beast ==
The Silver Arm: A science fiction retelling of Beauty and the Beast by Ariele Sieling

The third book in the Rove City series focuses on Maybelle, a bot and ship-fixing mechanic, in Rove city. When her father, a merchant, does not return from his most recent journey, Maybelle's family finds themselves running out of money. Maybelle finds her father held captive by a cyborg named Amarok, who will only release her father if Maybelle remains in his stead.

Beauty & the Beast (2012 TV Series) aired on The CW and developed by Sherri Cooper-Landsman and Jennifer Levin

Beauty and the Alien Beast by Zara Zenia

When the Trilyn, an alien race, made a pact with Earth's inhabitants to find 7 alien prides for their 7 princes, Prince Manzar struggles to find one due to his temperament and beastly looks. This begins to change when a political dissident and his daughter, Andromeda, seek refuge at Manzar's castle.

Beauty & the Beast X-Men: The Animated Series: Season 2, Episode 10

Beast, a mutant, falls in love with his human patient, Carly. Despite their mutual affection, Carly's father possesses anti-mutant sentiments which places a barrier between the two lovers.

Of Beast and Beauty by Stacey Jay

Princess Isra, a blind Smoothskin in the city of Yuan, exists as a human sacrifice to ensure the wellbeing of her city. Gem, a member of the mutant beast race of the Monstrous, fights in the desert to defend his people from imminent starvation. Isra befriends Gem and cares for him, after he is held captive in her city for trying to steal their sacred rose. Isra is face with choosing between the people of Yuan and her love for Gem.

Beauty and the Beast: A Dark Tale (2012 TV Movie)

Princess Grace, who has been leading the kingdom of Kandan in the stead of her poisoned father, is taken captive by a beast called Shiro. Despite his allegiance to Princess Grace's enemies, he releases her so that she can save her father. The connection that the two made eventually brings them back together in an attempt to save Kandan.

Beauty and His Beast by Bey Deckard

After having been in a stasis pod for 17 years, Juniper Bo wakes up on a ship where cursed and exiled Captain Marrex and two AIs are the only inhabitants. Captain Marrex and Juniper begin to bond, but the captain has doubts that Juniper will stay.
