= Spherical Harmonic =

2001 novel by Catherine Asaro

- Author: Catherine Asaro
- Language: English
- Series: Saga of the Skolian Empire
- Genre: Science fiction
- Publisher: Tor Books
- Publication date: December 2001
- Publication place: United States
- Media type: Hardcover
- Pages: 512
- ISBN: 978-0-312-89063-6
- Preceded by: The Quantum Rose
- Followed by: The Moon's Shadow

Spherical Harmonic is a science fiction novel from the Saga of the Skolian Empire by Catherine Asaro. It tells the story of Dyhianna Selei (Dehya), the Ruby Pharaoh of the Skolian Imperialate, as she strives to reform her government and reunite her family in the aftermath of a devastating interstellar war.

== Plot summary ==
Spherical Harmonic is a first person narrative told from the viewpoint of Dyhianna Selei. Although an elected Assembly governs the Imperialate, in ages past the Ruby Pharaoh ruled as absolute sovereign. Selei is the descendant of the ancient pharaohs, and is considered the titular ruler of modern Skolia. Spherical Harmonic takes place following the Radiance War, a conflict fought between the Imperialate and the Eubian Concord, an empire ruled by a rigid caste of narcissists called Aristos. The Eubian economy is based on slave trade, which the Aristos seek to expand to the Imperialate.

Just prior to the opening scene of Spherical Harmonic, Dyhianna Selei escapes a Eubian military force by stepping into a Lock, a singularity that defines the boundary between two universes. In mathematical terms, she has entered an alternate dimension defined by the functions known as spherical harmonics. As the book opens, she is "coalescing" on a moon called Opalite. She reforms in partial waves that transfer her from one universe to the other. Some prose in the book is written in the shape of the sinusoidal functions found in the spherical harmonics.

As Selei fades in and out of existence, in danger of disappearing, she slowly recovers her memories about her identity and history. She manages to activate an emergency protocol secretly established on the moon for her protection. As a result, she is found by Jon Casestar, an admiral in the Skolian Fleet, and Commander Vaz Majda, an elite fighter pilot who is also her sister-in-law. Once aboard an ISC battle cruiser, Selei strives to reunite the Ruby Dynasty and find out what has happened to her people. The book follows her attempts to resurrect the Skolian military and government.

Selei also struggles to discover what has happened to her son Taquinil and her husband Eldrinson. Her plan to go to Earth and free members of the Ruby Dynasty being held captive there, including Roca, her sister and heir, meets little enthusiasm among her top officers, as it can be seen as an act of war. Unable to trust anyone, Selei ends up seeking to overthrow the elected government of her own empire so she can rebuild it from the ashes of the war.

== Context ==
In one sense, Spherical Harmonic is a space adventure about the recovery of a civilization from a war that had no winner. On another level, it is about the emotional toll that war exacts on those who survive it, a theme Asaro often explores in the Saga of the Skolian Empire, as exemplified by the subplot in Spherical Harmonic involving the attempts of Selei and her husband to come to terms with his shattering experiences during the war. Both acclaimed and criticized for the complexity of her plotting, world building, and character development, Asaro focuses as much on the human condition as the adventure aspects of the story.

Asaro is also known for the use of mathematics in her novels. Spherical Harmonic involves an imagined universe based on the Hilbert space described by the angular wave functions that solve the Laplace Equation. The spherical harmonics are an orthonormal set of eigenfunctions used in many areas of math and physics, including quantum mechanics and electromagnetics. A theoretical physicist by training, Asaro uses the concepts of the Hilbert space described by the harmonics to create the universe called Kyle space. By directly applying the rules that define Hilbert spaces, the author invents a universe where "location" is based on quantum wave functions rather than position and time, and where a psion's thoughts determined their location in Kyle space. As described in an essay at the end of the book, the properties of that universe and the abstract forms of human interaction there are fictional extrapolations of the mathematical theory.

The novel Spherical Harmonic overlaps with Ascendant Sun which tells the events after the Radiance War from the point of view of new Skolian Imperator Kelric. It also overlaps with the book The Moon's Shadow which centers on Eubian Emperor Jaibriol III and his efforts to initiate peace talks with Skolians after the war.
