= Challenging Destiny =

Science fiction magazine

- Cover of the first issue
- Editor: David M. Switzer; Robert P. Switzer
- Former editors: Graham Wall
- Publisher: Crystalline Sphere Publishing
- First issue: May 1997; 28 years ago
- Final issue Number: December 2007; 18 years ago 25
- Country: Canada
- Language: English
- Website: challengingdestiny.com
- ISSN: 1206-6656

Challenging Destiny was a science fiction magazine published between 1997 and 2007.

== History ==
Challenging Destiny was created by David M. Switzer and Graham Wall, respectively a professor and student at the University of Waterloo. They founded a small press in St. Marys, Ontario – Crystalline Sphere Publishing – to publish the magazine, and put out their first issue in May 1997. The two edited two issues, after which Robert P. Switzer replaced Wall. The magazine was printed until December 2003, after which it was published online. A story from the 24th issue received the Aurora Award for Best Short Fiction in 2008. The 25th and final issue was published in December 2007.

== Reception ==
The writer Mike Ashley, in the magazine's entry in The Encyclopedia of Science Fiction, wrote that the magazine's non-fiction articles were among its better features; these included interviews with authors, editorials by Switzer, and several essays by James Schellenberg. Science Fiction Chronicle's Steve Sawicki, reviewing the eighth issue, was disappointed by the selection of stories, and felt that the interview with Phyllis Gotlieb did not maintain a topical focus.
