= Ascendant Sun =

2000 novel by Catherine Asaro

- Author: Catherine Asaro
- Series: Saga of the Skolian Empire
- Genre: Science fiction
- Publisher: Tor Books
- Publication date: March 2000
- Media type: Hardcover
- Pages: 384
- ISBN: 978-0-312-86824-6
- Preceded by: The Last Hawk
- Followed by: The Moon's Shadow

Ascendant Sun is a novel which tells the story of how Kelric made it back to Earth, to become Imperator of the Skolian Empire and lead his people towards peace with the Eubians in the Saga of the Skolian Empire series by Catherine Asaro.

== Plot ==
The book begins just after Kelric has escaped the planet of Coba, where he had been held prisoner for over 18 years. Forced to land because of his ships short fuel supply, Kelric takes up a lucrative job as the spaceship Corona's tactical officer under the command of Jafe Maccar, only to be captured by his people's enemies, the Eubians. An Aristo Taratus sells Kelric in an auction to Tarquine Iquar, Minister of Finance. Kelric discovers his mixed feelings for Tarquine, even though he is made to be her slave and provider. Not long after his enslavement, Kelric makes a bold escape, which although successful, cripples his health significantly.

Instead of immediately heading home, Kelric heads to the captured Lock, an ancient device made by the original Ruby Empire some 6000 years ago which fell into the Eubians possession during the Radiance War. There, he deactivates the mechanism and meets Jaibriol III, new emperor of the Eubian Empire, whom he immediately suspects to be a psion. Jaibriol proposes peace talks between Eube and Skolia.

He manages to make it to another planet, where he meets his future wife Jeejon. Together, they are able to gain passage off world, to Earth. The book's climax is Kelric reuniting with his parents on Earth.

== See also ==
- The Last Hawk – book describing Kelrics's involuntary stay on Coba until his escape
- The Moon's Shadow – book that centers mostly around Jaibriol III and the peace talks between Eubia and Skolia
