= Saga of the Skolian Empire =

Series of science fiction novels

The Saga of the Skolian Empire, informally called the Skolian Saga or Tales of the Ruby Dynasty, is a series of science fiction novels, novellas and novelettes by Catherine Asaro, revolving around characters from an interstellar empire known as the Skolian Empire and their power struggle with the rival Eubian Concord. The plot of the book unfolds over several generations of characters and revolves around political intrigues, but also contains subplots regarding physics, bio-enhancements, virtual computer networks, romance, mathematics, and military conflict as it is affected by superluminal space travel.

== Skolian Empire ==
Skolian Imperialate

In-universe information
- Created by: Lahaylia Selei
- Creation date: 1904 A.D.
- Capital: Parthonia
- Language: Skolian Flag
- Leader: Dyhianna Selei (Ruby Pharaoh) and Barcala Tikal (First Councilor)

The Skolian Empire, or Skolian Imperialate, is one of the major empires in the science fiction novel series called the Saga of the Skolian Empire by Catherine Asaro.

The stories of Asaro mostly revolve around the Skolian Empire. She also has written several novellas and novelettes on the world of the Skolian Empire.

=== Political situation ===
Skolians are in a permanent near-war state with their enemy, the Eubians, who rule a much bigger star-spanning empire called the Eubian Concord. Eubians (often also referred to as Traders, due to their flourishing slave trade) have stronger militaries and dispose of greater resources. Skolians, though weaker, balance this out by usage of their faster-than-light interstellar communication network called psiberweb, which gives them an important advantage and is the only obstacle that prevents the Eubians from conquering Skolia.

Another player on the interstellar stage is the Allieds, the smallest of the three empires, centered on Earth. They act in a strictly neutral way to both Eubians and Skolians and support the solution of their neighbour's conflicts by political, rather than military means.

=== Society ===
Today's Skolian Empire is an egalitarian society, but the original Ruby Empire was a matriarchy and remnants of this still remain in Skolian culture. Although it is now not uncommon for men to hold an influential position, many important ranks in Skolian politics and the military are still occupied by women. Many people, especially members of the noble houses, still consider men as the "weaker gender".

=== Government ===
The Skolian Imperialate is ruled partly by the Assembly, an elected parliament; and by the Ruby Dynasty, a hereditary monarchy. According to traditional Skolian political theory, the ruling body is absolute, therefore the Assembly is Sovereign. All powers of the Imperator and the Pharaoh are theoretically derived from the Assembly, including their right to vote within the Assembly. In actuality the Pharaoh, and also the Imperator, have power because they are necessary to the continued existence of the Imperialate. In the case of the Pharaoh, traditional loyalty to the Ruby Dynasty queen also plays an important role. This makes the Assembly's power far from absolute.

==== Assembly ====
The Assembly consists of thousands of delegates, who represent the many worlds of the Imperialate. The number of votes held by delegates depends on the size of the population of the planet that elected them and also on their status within the Assembly. The largest block of votes belongs to the First Councilor, who is the leader of the Assembly. The next largest blocks are held by Councilors of the Inner Circle and by Skolian Imperator and Ruby Pharaoh. All Skolian noble houses have hereditary seats in the Assembly but only the Ruby Dynasty and the House of Majda have blocs of votes with considerable influence.

There are five main political parties within the Assembly:

- the Royalists want royalty to rule the empire, instead of the elected parliament
- the Traditionalists would prefer to return to matriarchy and seclude men into harems
- the Progressives promote modernization and major changes in society
- the Technologists urge technological improvements
- the Moderates are the largest and most influential group, trying to balance out the other four

The Inner Circle consists of elected Councilors representing different ministries of the Skolian government: Industry, Life, Finance, Intelligence, Judiciary, Stars, Planetary Development, Domestic Affairs, Foreign Affairs, Protocol, and Nature. The Foreign Affairs Councillor is Roca Skolia.

Besides the Assembly, two important titles in the Skolian government are held by members of the Ruby Dynasty.

==== Ruby Pharaoh ====
Ruby Pharaoh is the hereditary title of a reigning monarch. It dates back to the ancient Ruby Empire that was ruled by powerful warrior queens. When the modern Skolian Empire was founded, the title of Ruby Pharaoh was resurrected, yet this time the power of a Pharaoh is not absolute anymore. An elected Assembly governs, with the Pharaoh being mainly the titular head of the empire, though she holds an important bloc of votes in the Assembly. The role of the Pharaoh is also associated with the Triad title of Assembly Key, though both positions don't have to be necessarily joined. There have been only two Skolian Pharaohs so far – Lahaylia Selei, the founder of the Imperialate, and her daughter Dyhianna, who is the current Pharaoh. The heirs to the throne are Dyhiannas sons, first Taquinil, then Althor, with her younger sister Roca being next in line.

==== Imperator ====
The title of Imperator is associated with the army, the Imperator being the supreme commander of all Skolian military forces. This title is also hereditary but the Imperator can choose a successor from among several suitable candidates. If a member of the Ruby Dynasty cannot assume this title for some reason, then the person who is currently next in command of the military becomes Imperator. To do the job well, to its full extent, the Imperator also has to be the Military Key in the Triad, as the commander must be able to coordinate the military forces with an amount of speed only allowed by using the psiberweb. The Skolian Imperators so far have been Jarac Skolia, Kurj Skolia, Sauscony Valdoria Skolia, General Naaj Majda, and Kelric Valdoria Skolia who presently holds the title.

=== History ===
The Skolian Empire traces its roots to six thousand years ago, when an unknown race took humans from Earth and resettled them on a planet called Raylicon. Then the unknown race disappeared, leaving only parts of their technology behind. The humans on Raylicon used this technology to develop space travel. They founded the Ruby Empire and colonized hundreds of planets. But the empire collapsed, and many worlds were left isolated for thousands of years. Gradually, the empire was rebuilt, and approximately 400 years ago, the Raylicans re-developed space travel.

The Raylicans also rediscovered the Locks, devices that have allowed advanced telepaths to establish the interstellar network called the Kyle Web or psiberweb, which can be used by others. Thus, the Rhon project was developed to develop genetically the necessary neurochemistry to power the Locks. The unintended result of the Rhon project, however, was the creation of Aristos, a race of anti-empaths, whose brains interpret pain of others (especially of psions) as pleasure, which turned them into sadists.

This result led to the birth of two competing interstellar empires – Eubian Concord (founded by Aristos) and Skolian Empire – founded by Lahaylia Selei, progenitor of the modern Ruby Dynasty, a family of Rhon telepaths who currently co-rule the Skolian Imperialate and power and maintain the Kyle Web.

=== Important Skolian worlds ===
- Parthonia – the seat of the Skolian government where Assembly meetings take place.
- Metropoli – most heavily populated planet in the Imperialate.
- Diesha – seat of the Jagernaut military academy and of ISC.
- Lyshriol – homeworld of the Valdoria branch of the Ruby Dynasty.
- Orbiter – space habitat, home of the Ruby Pharaoh and a place where one of the three Locks is located.
- Onyx platform – a complex of space stations designed to defend the Third Lock. Onyx was destroyed during the Radiance War and the Lock was captured by Traders.
- Raylicon – birthplace of the Ruby Empire, location of the First Lock.

=== Military ===
The collection of Skolian armed forces is called Imperial Space Command, or ISC. The commander-in-chief of all ISC forces is the Imperator of Skolia.

The ISC has four divisions:

- J-Force – analogous to air force, consists of Jag fighters and their Jagernaut pilots
- Advance Services Corps – scouts planets
- Pharaoh's Army – the oldest branch with a 5000-year history traced back to the beginning of the Ruby Empire, concentrates mainly on planetary war conflicts
- Imperial Fleet – originated in the navy on Raylicon, now it dominates the space division of ISC

The main centers of ISC are the space habitat Orbiter with its War Room, Triad Chair and Lock, the Onyx Platform protecting the Third Lock and the planet Diesha, which serves as the ISC headquarters and seat of the Dieshan Military Academy.

=== Science ===
Asaro is known as a hard science fiction writer for the scientific depth of her work. The amount of science varies from book to book, with novels such as Primary Inversion, The Radiant Seas, and Spherical Harmonic on the most scientifically dense end of the spectrum, including elements such as equations and diagrams of quantum mechanical wave functions and Klein bottles. Stanley Schmidt, the long time editor of Analog magazine, wrote that Primary Inversion is "an impressive first novel; not just a good story, but the kind of speculation we too seldom see – really new science that just might be possible." Asaro is noted as one of the few female science fiction writers who also has a doctorate in hard science, in Asaro's case a PhD from Harvard in theoretical Chemical Physics.

The novel Spherical Harmonic involves an imagined universe based on the Hilbert space described by the spherical harmonic eigenfunctions that solve the Laplace Equation, and some prose in the book is written in the shape of the sinusoidal waves found in the spherical harmonics. Her novel The Quantum Rose is an allegory to quantum scattering theory and is dedicated to her doctoral advisors and mentors in the subject, Alex Dalgarno, Kate Kirby, and Eric J. Heller. The novella "Aurora in Four Voices" includes topics ranging from Fourier series to integration problems in calculus. In essays at the back of some of her novels, Asaro explains the mathematical and physics basis of the ideas used in the books, in particular Spherical Harmonic, The Quantum Rose, and The Moon's Shadow. In the anthology Aurora in Four Voices (which includes the novella of the same name), Asaro describes the mathematical basis of several stories in the anthology, including the use of Fourier transforms, Riemann sheets, and complex numbers in "The SpaceTime Pool."

==== Inversion ====
The method of space travel used in the Skolian Empire books comes from a paper Asaro wrote on complex variables and special relativity that appeared in the American Journal of Physics. The form of space travel is called "inversion" because the equations of relativistic physics predict that if ships could travel in a supraluminal universe, the constellations as we know them would appear inverted in position.

In the abstract for her paper, "Complex Speeds and Special Relativity," Asaro writes "The quest to find faster‐than‐light particles has intrigued physicists for decades, though it has yet to turn up any real candidates. Even if a superluminal universe does exist, we have no way to reach it given that we must go through the speed of light, which to the best of our knowledge is impossible. In this paper, I show that by making speed complex, we can go around the speed of light in a manner analogous to the way a car faced with an infinitely tall roadblock might leave the road to go around that barrier. The treatment is a mathematical device; no known physical interpretation exists for the imaginary part of a complex speed. However, it can provide an entertaining problem in special relativity, one that may encourage students to think about the connections between equations and the physical universe."

==== Evolving Intelligence ====
Evolving Intelligence, also known as EI, is the term given to sophisticated computer systems, similar to what is commonly known as artificial Intelligence, or AI, but with more capabilities, such as complex learning algorithms and personality routines. EIs are used for example in starships or as administrators of computer systems in a house or complex of buildings.

==== Quasis ====
In interstellar travel, Skolians often make use of quasis, which is a form of quantum-shielding that freezes the quantum state of all particles on a spacecraft.

Ships in both the Skolian Empire and the Eubians are equipped with devices, controlled by EIs that shift a ship into "quasis" to avoid damage to the ship from weapons fire or from high-G maneuvers. The quasis prevents change in the quantum state of any particle, temporarily rendering the ship invulnerable. While in quasis, the quantum state of all the occupants of the ship also freezes causing the crew to experience the quasis as a disjointed segment of time.

Each weapon strike against a ship in quasis weakens its quasis field. The novels describe an unspecified number of weapon hits (typically suggesting two to four) that will collapse a quasis field and re-animate the crew in the midst of a massive explosion. A collapse of a quasis field results in a rupture of the Klein bottles holding the anti-matter fuel used to power the ship, resulting in matter-antimatter explosions.

=== Health care ===
==== Age delaying treatments ====
Due to advanced nanotechnology, microscopic nanomeds can be put into people's bodies to manage cell repair and delay aging. This enables the extension of a human lifespan to several centuries. People also keep a young appearance, as they stop visibly aging at the age of 30 – 40. It is important to start the treatments as early in life as possible. People who received those treatments in early childhood or before birth (passed on from mother to child during pregnancy) achieve the best results. The older a person is when receiving anti-aging treatments for the first time, the larger the possibility that they won't work that well.

==== Bio-enhancements ====
In Skolian Empire, many people, most often in the military or administration, carry bio-implants. Most common are nodes in brain which are used mainly as extended memory to store useful data. Many people have also psiphon sockets in their spine, wrists, and ankles, that enable them to lock into the psiberweb. People who suffer severe injuries and lose their limbs or eyes can get prosthetic ones.

=== Languages ===
The Skolian Imperialate consists of many worlds with hundreds or thousands of different languages. The language that was chosen as a common tongue is called Skolian Flag. People from the Ruby Dynasty and other noble houses speak a nearly extinct language called Iotic.

== Political situation ==
The Ruby Dynasty, the ancient rulers of the Skolian Empire, while possessing empathic and telepathic abilities enhanced by "pico" and "nano" technology, constitute a monarchy plagued by internal struggle and conflict with the elected Assembly.

The Eubian Traders, on the other hand, while larger in number and more successful economically, constitute a society built entirely of a slave hierarchy run by Aristos, who have been genetically engineered and have no capability for compassion, but rather experience pleasure in the form of "transcendence" through the projected suffering of powerful psions that have been kidnapped from the Skolian Imperialate.

A third but much smaller group, the Allieds, are an extension of a present-day Earth civilization who enter space travel only to find all worlds are already inhabited and thriving under either the Skolian or Eubian Empire. Their role in the series is that of a neutral party, interested only in the cessation of hostilities.

== Historical background ==
Around 6,000 years ago an unknown race moved a group of Mayan humans from Earth to the distant planet Raylicon. Then the kidnappers disappeared, leaving their victims on their own.

The Raylicans developed star travel using the remains of three starships left behind by the aliens on their new homeworld. They reverse engineered the technology, allowing them to achieve spaceflight and colonize hundreds of planets. They also discovered the Locks, an ancient and sentient alien technology that allowed them to create the psiberweb, an interstellar network existing outside of normal space and time that transmits messages instantaneously. Their empire was called the Ruby Empire.

The Ruby Empire was a matriarchy ruled by powerful females who held the title of Ruby Pharaoh. The Pharaohs wielded enormous power, leading armies to wars and treating their husbands like property. Succession went strictly through the female line, men being seen as incapable of such responsibilities. A man could only become a Pharaoh under special circumstances, such as his when his royal mother had no daughters.

However, their shallow understanding of space-faring technology, and possibly their corruption, led to the empire's collapse after only a few centuries. This isolated the hundreds of planets in their empire from each other for thousands of years. Eventually, about 400 years ago, Raylicans re-achieved space flight, this time fully understanding the technology, and started to rebuild their empire.

Because of this theme, Asaro's Skolian Empire novels have been categorized in the lost world genre.

== Ruby Dynasty ==
By the time the Raylicans started rebuilding their empire, the psions which had a strong enough KAB Rating to power the psiberweb had been all but lost. As a result, the Rhon project was created to genetically engineer the traits necessary to create the psiberweb. The ruling family of today's Skolian Empire is called the Ruby Dynasty, as Lahaylia Selei, the progenitor of the modern Ruby family, was cloned from the genetic material of one of the long dead warrior queens of the Ruby Empire.

The descendants of the Ruby Dynasty are all Rhon psions. They can read moods, and even particular thoughts. They were created in a genetic engineering experiment to help power the Locks.

Ruby Dynasty members differ physically from the members of other noble Houses, who are mostly dark-haired and dark-eyed, also with darker skin. This is because some ancestors of the Ruby Dynasty came from ancient colonies of the Ruby Empire, where people genetically engineered themselves to better adapt to their surroundings. The first Skolian Imperator Jarac was extremely tall (over 7 feet) with metallic skin, eyes and hair. Some of his descendants inherited these traits, particularly his daughter Roca and grandsons Kurj, Althor and Kelric. Ruby family members who look similar to the first Pharaoh Lahaylia, such as Dyhianna, Sauscony or Taquinil, are on the other hand smaller than average and slim with black hair. Eldrinson Valdoria, a native Lyshrioli, had violet eyes, fair skin and burgundy hair, which is also true for several of his children, especially Eldrin and Del-Kurj. Ruby Dynasty members tend to be good-looking because their progenitors were bred as pleasure slaves before they rebelled and established the Skolian Imperialate.

Once a member of the Ruby Dynasty makes contact with a Lock, they become part of the Triad (formerly a Dyad). A member of the Triad is called a Key. Three types of Keys exist: Assembly Key, Military Key and Web Key. Each Key has to have a unique personality different from the other two as much as possible because if the neurological processes are too similar, they cannot coexist in the Triad. So far the title of Pharaoh was always associated with the Assembly Key, while the title Imperator was associated with the Military Key.

== Jagernauts ==
Jagernauts are fictional soldiers in the Saga of the Skolian Empire by Catherine Asaro. They are members of the J-Force, which is an ISC elite fighting division composed of independent fighter pilots who engage in small squadron combat with the Eubians.

Jagernauts are psions with high Kyle Ratings, generally full empaths or even telepaths, with even a few Rhon serving as well. Their telepathic or empathic abilities mean that they function best when there is no crew (and their corresponding thoughts) to interfere with a Jagernaut's concentration. As such, they generally engage in battle in small squadrons, bound to their single-pilot craft called "Jags" in a near symbiosis of human and machine. A Jagernaut has "psiphon" sockets which allow them to interface their body directly with spacecraft. Their mind links directly to the ship's EI, and together they control all aspects of the ship.

A Jagernaut is enhanced with biomechanics. Bioplastics and other materials enhance their muscles and bones significantly. Although still requiring food, a Jagernaut has internal systems powered by a microfusion reactor. Complete with the latest in small-scale technology, Jagernauts have numerous nanomeds and nano/pico devices in their bodies that are responsible for a number of functions, including promoting injury recovery, preventing the ingestion of poison, augmenting skills, delaying aging, and more. Jagernauts are renowned for their large size and efficiency in battle.

=== Jagernaut ranks ===
Jagernauts ranks from highest to lowest

1. Primary (equivalent to Admiral)
2. Secondary (equivalent to Colonel)
3. Tertiary (equivalent to Major)
4. Quaternary (equivalent to Second Lieutenant)

The main training academy for Jagernauts is the Dieshan Military Academy (DMA). The cadet ranks from lowest to highest are: Apprentice, Journeyman, Junior, and Senior.

=== Mental problems ===
A Jagernaut exists on the razor's edge of sanity needing to balance empathy with efficient battle reflexes. Jagernauts must be psions to make the necessary neural links with the Evolving Intelligences of their starfighters, but that also means they experience what happens during war more intensely than most soldiers. To maintain self-control every Jagernaut is trained to adhere to a strict moral code of honor and personal decency.

Not all succeed in maintaining a balance between humanity and efficiency, giving J-Force the highest alcoholism and suicide rates within the forces of the Skolian Imperialate. Some Jagernauts manage to survive by suppressing their more human side, becoming either cold and machine-like (Kurj), or living lives of quiet emotional desperation and loneliness (Sauscony).

Help is usually available to emotionally damaged Jagernauts in the form of military psychiatric therapists, known as "heartbenders".

== Main characters of the Ruby Dynasty ==
=== Roca Skolia ===
Roca Skolia, also known as Roca, is the Foreign Affairs Councillor of the Skolian Imperialate. Daughter of the late Lahaylia Selei, founder of the Imperialate and her husband, former Imperator Jarac Skolia, she is also a Rhon psion. She is also younger sister of the recent Skolian Pharaoh Dyhianna Selei and as such next in line for position of Ruby Pharaoh and of Assembly Key in the Triad between the disappearance of Taquinil Selei and the birth of Althor Izam-na Selei. Since her personality is most like that of her late father and her late son Kurj, she is also considered an emergency backup choice for the position of Military Key in case something should ever happen to her youngest son, Kelric Valdoria, the current Imperator.

Roca was formerly a renowned dancer known under the name Cya Liessa, and possesses a remarkably aesthetic appeal. With her tall and well-shaped figure, angelic face, golden skin and eyes and long curly golden, copper and platinum hair, all inherited from her father Jarac, she looks like a sun goddess and most men are stunned by her appearance. Nobody would guess her to be more than 20 years old, yet she is already over 100. She is very kind and loves her family above everything, but she can be also very resolute and strong-willed. She is a brilliant politician who strongly participates in Skolian politics and won the position of the Foreign Affairs Councilor by election, not because of her royal title.

Roca was married three times. Her first marriage to the explorer Tokaba Ryestar was arranged by her parents with reference to the necessity to produce Rhon offspring (which is only possible with a suitable partner). It ended after only a few years with her husband's death. Roca had a son named Kurj from this marriage, who was born as a product of in-vitro fertilization. Roca's second marriage with Darr Hammerjackson was a disaster. He abused both her and her son for several years, before they finally divorced. The third and final marriage of Roca Skolia was to the much younger Eldrinson Althor Valdoria from a provincial planet called Lyshriol. Eldrinson was a perfect match to Roca - the first Rhon born in Skolian Empire who wasn't a member of the ruling family of Skolia. Roca and Eldrinson have 10 children.

The Skolian Imperialate novels in which Roca is a major character are:

- Skyfall - tells the story how Roca met her third husband Eldrinson.

=== Eldrinson Althor Valdoria ===
Eldrinson Althor Valdoria, also known as Eldri, was originally an illiterate farmer from the backward planet Lyshriol. He had the title of the Dalvador Bard, which made him sort of ruler in the Dalvador province. He was a brave, strong-willed and kind man who cared deeply for his people, and also a Rhon psion. Even at a young age he was a respected leader, loved by his people and famous for his spectacular singing voice which he used to perform one of his duties – recording history of his people in ballads. He has violet eyes, fair skin and burgundy hair, and only four fingers on each hand.

For a long time Eldrinson had seen himself as lacking. Mainly because of his epilepsy, which bothered him since childhood and nearly cost him his life when he became adult, as the seizures got worse and worse. Skolian doctors couldn't heal him completely but advanced medicine enabled him to live a nearly normal life.

The meeting with his wife's people also showed Eldrinson how backward and uneducated he and his fellows are in comparison with the majority of people in the Skolian Empire. The Lyshrioli, including himself, were genetically incapable of written language which made it impossible for them to learn how to read and write. Technical wonders Roca brought into Eldrinson's life both astounded and terrified him and he tried to avoid them when possible.

He had seven sons and three daughters with Roca and though he loved them all deeply, it was hard for him to understand those of his children who chose to live a modern life off-world, even joining the military. Problems with his children forced Eldrinson to re-think many opinions he took for granted (such as women cannot be warriors).

Despite his position as Roca's consort, most members of the imperial court looked at Eldrinson as someone far beneath them. This changed during a crisis, when Eldrinson saved the Skolian Empire by joining the Triad and becoming the Web Key. Eldrinson then served many decades as a Key to the psiberweb and became very popular among the common Skolians. Despite the life extending treatments, which didn't work for him as well as for most people, Eldrinson died of old age on his homeworld when he was 90, shortly after the end of Radiance War and reunion with his long lost son Kelric.

=== Sauscony Lahaylia Valdoria Skolia ===
Sauscony Lahaylia Valdoria Skolia, also called Soz or Soshoni, is a member of the Ruby Dynasty ruling the Skolian Empire, and as such has the empathic and telepathic abilities of a Rhon psion. She ranks Jagernaut Primary in the ISC, and later in the series becomes Imperator.

Soz was born on the rustic planet Lyshriol as the sixth of ten children of the local Bard Eldrinson Valdoria and his wife Roca Skolia, a Ruby Dynasty heir. Since early childhood she showed huge interest in modern technology of her mother's people, especially that connected to military. At the age of 16 she took preliminary entrance exams for the Dieshan Military Academy to fulfill her dream and become a Jagernaut. After achieving record high scores (perfect in fact) she was granted immediate acceptance into the academy – much to the displeasure of her father, who feared losing his children to war and couldn't understand why she wanted to become a warrior when he had thought her rural life home could offer her a gentler life close to her family.

Soz excelled in all subjects, military strategy and engineering being just a few of them. She graduated from the DMA in three years with an honors record despite earning a record number demerits. Her later career also proceeded quickly, and she gained the rank of a Primary at a relatively early age. She became the leader of Blackstar Squadron and her half-brother Kurj Skolia, the Imperator of Skolia named her as one of his three possible imperial heirs (the other two being her brothers Althor and Kelric). She had to deal with the difficulties of her job, because her empath's mind experienced the deaths of enemies she killed. A capture during an undercover mission, when she was tortured and raped by an Aristo, also scarred her deeply.

Despite being a psion, she often has problems expressing her feelings. She is not good with words and prefers action to talking. Though hard-edged, Soz has also a sensitive side, which she doesn't show very often, because she considers it a weakness. As described by James Schellenberg in his review at Challenging Destiny, Soz is "a strong, dynamic character, one that people of either gender can easily identify with. However, Sauscony is not a one-note monolith of fortitude and brawn -- she is articulate, funny, and empathic to boot. But most of all, Sauscony is a character with a past, a past filled with needs, betrayals, tragedies, friends, and triumphs."

Soz's first marriage to Jato Stormson ended in divorce after Soz got pregnant but lost the baby after being injured during a space battle. Her second husband, Hypron Luminar, died of an uncurable illness after only a few months of marriage. Soz met her third husband Jaibriol Qox II on the Allied planet Delos. Like Soz, Jaibriol was a Rhon psion, but he was also a member of the Aristo Highton caste and heir to the enemy of Skolians, the Eubian Concord. To come together they first had to overcome many difficulties and finally decided to fake their own deaths to go into exile on an isolated planet within Allied (Earth) space, which they named Prism. They lived there a happy life there for 16 years and raised four children.

When Kurj died and Jaibriol was kidnapped by Eubians, Soz returned home to become the new Imperator of the Skolian Imperialate. To rescue her husband and prevent the Eubians from conquering Skolia, she sent a fleet to Eube's homeworld, Glory, extending a conflict that became known as the Radiance War. At the end of the war, she and Jaibriol faked their deaths again to go back into exile and start a stable colony on Prism together with their children, Soz's brother Althor and a group of Jagernaut volunteers. However, Soz's eldest son Jai separated from his family before his parents returned to Earth to claim their children. Grieving for his parents deaths and the devastation in the open space that was caused by war and by the Aristos, he later became the Emperor of Eube as Jaibriol III.

The Skolian Imperialate novels in which Soz is a major character are:

- Primary Inversion covering her early life and later meeting with Jaibriol Qox II;
- The short story "Aurora in Four Voices" where she meets and rescues Jato Stormson;
- The Radiant Seas which covers her escape with Jaibriol, life with children, return to Skolia, and second escape;
- The novelette "The Pyre of New Day" which tells the story of Hypron Luminar and how he meets her.

=== Kurj Skolia ===
Kurj Skolia, also known as Kurj, was an ambitious Jagernaut Primary, and later became Imperator Skolia.

Kurj was the son of Roca Skolia and had a troubled past involving his mother and various father figures. He and his mother were abused for many years by Roca's second husband Darr - Kurj's stepfather, who saw the pubescent boy as a rival. As he grew older, Kurj's subconscious attraction to and jealousy for his mother resulted in disaster when he found that his biological father was also his mother's father Jarac, which was a result of in vitro fertilization. He looks like his biological father Jarac and is tall with golden skin, eyes and hair. He killed Jarac by entering the Dyad, almost destroying the psiberweb.

He became a hard and often ruthless man, who pursued his goals without regard to others. During his time as a Jagernaut he learned to hate the Eubians with passion and would do everything possible to rid the universe of them. As an Imperator of Skolia he was both respected and feared. He remained jealous of Roca's much younger third husband Eldrinson Valdoria and never accepted him.

Despite his secret longing for family Kurj lived a lonely life, never letting his occasional lovers close enough to form a stable relationship. However, when the Assembly wanted him to marry a chosen noblewoman for political reasons, he defied their order by marrying his lover Ami, a beautiful, sweet-natured, and simple commoner.

Shortly after that Kurj died in a battle which also cost the life of Ur Qox, the ruler of Eubian Concord. His successor as Imperator of Skolia was his younger half-sister Soz Valdoria. Several months after Kurj's death Ami gave birth to his son Kurjson.

=== Kelricson Garlin Valdoria Skolia ===
Kelricson Garlin Valdoria Skolia, also known as Kelric, is a Jagernaut Tertiary in the ISC, and in later books became Imperator of the Skolian Empire. Kelric was born on the planet Lyshriol, as the youngest of ten children of Eldrison Valdoria and Roca Skolia, a member of the royal Ruby Dynasty. He looks like his mother and maternal grandfather Jarac, who was tall with golden skin, eyes and hair.

Kelric gained military training and served several years in the J-force. He was designated as one of the three imperial heirs (together with his brother Althor and sister Sauscony) to his older half-brother Kurj, who was Imperator of the Skolian Empire. But then Kelric's ship was damaged during an attack and he was stranded on the planet Coba for over eighteen years, all the while presumed deceased by his family. He became an expert in the dice game of Quis used as a form of universal communication on Coba, and was passed among several female governors as valuable property. He eventually escaped and made his way to Edgewhirl.

There he learns that much of his family has been either killed or captured during the Radiance War. He takes a couple of jobs in an attempt to earn enough money to transport his captive remaining family members on Earth. However, on a merchant exchange, he is captured by an Aristo named Azar Taratus and sold to Eubian Finance Minister Tarquine Iquar. Eventually, Kelric escapes her as well. He visits the Lock which the Eubians had captured and deactivates it. He boldly escapes, only to end up once again stranded on another planet, this one called Spikedown. There he meets Jeejon, whom he later weds, but not before she helps him buy passage off the planet. Together they make their way to Earth where Kelric is reunited with his family.

When the Ruby Dynasty family members were rescued from Earth by Pharaoh Dyhianna Selei, Kelric finally inherited the position of the Skolian Imperator, as his predecessors, his sister Sauscony and half-brother Kurj were dead or presumed dead.

The Skolian Imperialate novels in which Kelric is a major character are:

- The Last Hawk - about Kelric's life on Coba's various estates
- Ascendant Sun - about Kelric's captivity and escape from Tarquine Iquar
- "A Roll of the Dice" - Kelric as Imperator.
- Carnelians - Kelric as Imperator.

=== Jaibriol III ===
Jaibriol III, also called Jai, is the son of both an Aristo and a psion – his father is the previous Eubian Emperor Jaibriol Qox II and his mother is Sauscony Valdoria, the former Imperator of Skolia. Jai is the oldest of four children, has a sister named Rocalisa and brothers Vitar and Del-Kelric. Both parents of Jaibriol III are believed to be dead, though they are secretly living with their other children on the planet Prism.

At seventeen years of age, Jai is crowned emperor of the Eubian Concord as Jaibriol III. After that he has to deal with many difficulties, one of which is that he is too young and inexperienced to rule an interstellar empire. Another one is that members of Eubian noble houses, including his own ministers, are not very happy with changes which the idealistic young ruler would like to bring into their life – like peace with their enemy, the Skolians. When several assassination attempts threaten his life, he has to learn quickly how to survive in the hard and dangerous Eubian society.

His closest ally becomes his cousin Corbal Xir, one of the very few Aristos who has voluntarily given up transcendence. A short time after ascending the throne Jaibriol III marries the Eubian Trade Minister Tarquine Iquar.

The Skolian Imperialate novels in which Jairbiol III is a major character are:

- The Moon's Shadow - a story how Jaibriol III became emperor of Eube
- The Ruby Dice - the political battle to regain peace between Skolian Imperialite and Eubean Concord, takes place 10 years after the events of the Radiance war
- Carnelians - the continued efforts to reach peace between the Skolian Imperialite and Eubian Concord, takes place nineteen years after the events of the Radiance war.

=== Tarquine Iquar ===
Tarquine Iquar, is the Minister of Finance and a key player in the politics of the Eubian Concord.

Tarquine is a Highton Aristo, a member of the ruling class in the Eubian Concord. She is head of the Iquar line and aunt to Viquara Iquar, who was married to the late Eubian Emperor Ur Qox. Tarquine was briefly married in her youth but divorced soon, having thus no legitimate offspring. She values her independence and prefers enjoying charms of her provider slaves to an arranged Highton marriage.

She is beautiful, very intelligent but ambitious, intrigant, unscrupulous and calculating. When we are first introduced to her, she is already over 100 years old (but looks young due to advanced anti-aging treatments) and a wealthy, powerful and dangerous woman.

Tarquine is also one of the very few Aristos who had the Kyle Afferent Body removed from her brain because she began to hate how her transcending inflicted pain on others but could not resist the temptation of transcendence. She however has to keep this secret, as she would lose her title and property, maybe even life, if this ever became known.

She was for a short time the owner of Skolian Imperator Kelric, after he was caught by Eubian pirates and sold on a slave auction. Determined to possess him, Tarquine didn't hesitate to pay incredible 14 million credits for him, the highest price ever paid for a provider. Kelric's escape after only a couple of days was a big disappointment for her.

After Jaibriol III ascends the Eubian throne, Tarquine becomes his wife and Empress of Eube. Jai feels attracted to her although she is an Aristo and he a psion, because she has given up transcendence. To her shock, she developed genuine feelings for her much younger husband, seeking to promote his idealistic goals not because she believed in them, but for his sake.

=== Dyhianna Selei ===
Dyhianna Selei, also called Dehya, is the Ruby Pharaoh, the titular head of the Skolian Imperialate. She is a mathematical genius, who can even predict future events with the help of her equations. She dislikes giving public speeches and dressing in long skirts (her preferred style is jumpsuit), and would rather spend her time solving math problems than ruling an empire. Dehya is the oldest living member of the Ruby Dynasty, actually even the oldest living Skolian. She is also a member of the Imperial Triad and functions as its Assembly Key.

Unlike her younger sister Roca, who has the beautiful figure of a former dancer, Dehya is small, slender with a childlike face and appears to be helpless and vulnerable. But anyone who would see her that way would be mistaken. Dehya is very strong-minded, courageous and has a superior intellect.

Dehya was married twice with both weddings being arranged for her for political reasons by the Skolian governing body, the Assembly. Her first marriage to Seth Rockworth, a top officer from Earth, established the Icelandic treaty between Allieds and Skolians. They were married for several decades but had no children and later divorced. Her second marriage was strictly enforced by the Assembly – against her will Dehya had to marry her own nephew Eldrin Valdoria. Eldrin was, like her, a Rhon psion and the Assembly was desperate for producing more Rhon heirs. Luckily, with time Dehya and Eldrin happened to fall in love with each other and are having a happy marriage now. Being so closely related to her husband however led to genetic issues with Dehya's offspring.

=== Taquinil Selei ===
Taquinil Selei is the firstborn son of Ruby Pharaoh Dyhianna Selei and her second husband and nephew Eldrin. He resembles his mother very much, not only with his small, slender figure and dark hair but also with his enormous intellect. He is a genius who since early childhood showed huge talent for math and computer science. He studied economics and became a professor at the prestigious University of Parthonia. His predictions concerning the course of the stock exchange trade are legendary.

Taquinil's brilliant mind is very fragile. He is the most sensitive Rhon psion ever born, lacking the mental barriers that protect other empaths from emotions projected by people around them. When he was a child, his parents had to shield him constantly, which however became impossible as he grew older and wanted to have a life on his own. When he left to study at the university, his mind couldn't endure the attacks of emotions and split into many different personalities. After a long therapy with strong medications Taquinil was able to incorporate all of these personalities again. Doctors also put a biomech inside his body that provided the chemicals his brain lacked, which were necessary to block empathic input. This enabled him to live an almost normal life.

During the Radiance War when Orbiter, where his family lived, is attacked by Eubians, Taquinil and Dyhianna jump into the Lock to save themselves from their pursuers, their bodies becoming wavefunctions in the psiberspace. Unlike his mother, who later coalesces on the moon Opalite, Taquinil doesn't want to return to his human existence. In psiberspace he finally finds peace from the onslaught of peoples’ emotions that crushed his mind since he was a boy. Although it is unclear whether his mind and body can survive intact, without being slowly dissolved in the structure of the Kyle Web, he decides to stay. The content of Catch the Lightning indicates that 50 years after this incident Taquinil is still considered either dead or missing.

== Planets ==
=== Raylicon ===
During the golden era of the Ruby Empire, Raylicon was the empire's capital and center of political power. Yet despite being the birthplace of two interstellar empires, today's Raylicon is a nearly abandoned world. The sole inhabitants are the Abaj, a group of warriors who are all clones of the original extinct Raylicans. They act as bodyguards to the Ruby Dynasty, the ruling family of the Skolian Empire.

=== Lyshriol ===
Lyshriol is the name of the homeworld of one branch of Ruby Dynasty. The Allieds call the planet Skyfall.

Lyshriol is a heavy gravity world with two suns called Valdor and Aldan. It has a circular orbit and no axial tilt, so day and night are of the same length and there are no seasons. The main, most heavily populated provinces are Dalvador and Rillia. General population of Lyshriol is not very large, there are about 400 thousand people in the whole world. The language spoken there is called Trillian and although some dialects may exist, they are not very different from each other.

The planet got its other name Skyfall because of its blue-colored water and snow, which looks like the sky has fallen on earth. Water in any form on Lyshriol contains impurities which turn everything blue. This is however not dangerous for humans and doesn't cause any problems to the inhabitants who carry in their bodies nanomeds that degrade the blue dye.

Lyshriol has lavender sky and big plains of green and silvery grass. Its biosphere is full of unique animals, famous are especially lyrine - animals that look like horses, with crystalline horns and silver, lavender, or blue coats. A Lyshrioli meal is made up entirely of bubbles, which vary in size, color, and flavour.

Lyshriol is a planet where the humans and the planet seem to have been designed for some unknown purpose, probably by the ancient Ruby Empire. The humans have hinged hands with only four digits and unlike the majority of the population in the Skolian Imperialate, who are dark-skinned, dark-eyed and dark-haired, they have fair skin, violet eyes and red or blond hair. They have a genetic predisposition to illiteracy and are mostly not able to learn how to read or write. They are however very musical with chiming voices, love singing, dancing and festivals.

==== Bards ====
Bards record the history of the Lyshrioli people in ballads. They also execute the duties of judges, perform marriage ceremonies, and lead armies in wars. Every village has its own Bard, a man who is chosen by his fellows for this position because of his ability to sing and lead. Only two Bard titles on Lyshriol are hereditary, passed on from father to son – Dalvador Bard and Rillia Bard.

==== Memories ====
Memories are women with eidetic memories, who record important events with their mind. They wear long red robes. Their unique memory was genetically engineered into the Lyshrioli by geneticists of the long-lost Ruby Empire.

==== Blue Dale Archers ====
Archers are a Lyshrioli ethnic group that was long believed to be extinct. They differ from the overall Lyshrioli population significantly with their lither build, white-gold hair, and silver eyes. They live in nomadic tribes in Blue Mountains, rarely leaving the area and avoid dealing with other Lyshrioli. Unlike them, they are not farmers and make their living by hunting. It is suspected that the Blue Dale Archers are also the result of a genetic engineering project by the ancient Ruby Empire, since they have the ability to enter Kyle Space in a trance state, without the use of a Triad Chair or any other machinery.

== Works published in series ==
See: Catherine Asaro bibliography#Saga of the Skolian Empire
