= The Radiant Seas =

1999 novel by Catherine Asaro

- Author: Catherine Asaro
- Series: Saga of the Skolian Empire
- Genre: Science fiction
- Publisher: Tor Science Fiction
- Publication date: November 1999
- Media type: Paperbound
- Pages: 512
- ISBN: 978-0-8125-8036-5
- Preceded by: Primary Inversion
- Followed by: The Shadowed Heart

The Radiant Seas is a novel from the Saga of the Skolian Empire series of books by Catherine Asaro. The book continues from where Primary Inversion ended and centers on the story of the devastating interstellar Radiance War. It won the HOMer Award for Best Novel of 2000 from the SF and Fantasy forum on CompuServe.

Radiant Seas follows the lives of several Ruby Dynasty members (especially Sauscony (Soz), Kurj, and Althor) and also of main political figures from the Eubian Concord (emperor Ur Qox and his wife Viquara) during a period of nearly 18 years.

== Plot ==
Sauscony, a Jagernaut and heir to the Skolian Imperialate, fakes her death and elopes with Jaibriol Qox, the heir to the Eubian Concord. They relocate to an Allied-discovered, unknown planet which they call Prism. They have four children and live a relatively quiet life, though they know that someday they must return to their warring civilizations. Their children are heirs to both the Skolian Empire and the Eubian Concord.

Kurj has to deal not only with the shocking sudden death of Soz, whom he had named as his successor, but also with the political intrigues of the Eubian emperor Ur Qox, who draws the Allieds on his side, using lies and dirty tricks. When Ur tries to take Kurj prisoner, this leads to the destruction of a part of his fleet and to the death of both Ur and Kurj, leaving their two empires presumably heirless.

Soz's brother Althor inherits her position of the imperial heir after her apparent death. When he learns that his sister is alive, he promises his father Eldrinson to keep the secret for himself. But later he is captured by the Eubians during a space battle and unwillingly reveals this information after a brutal torture. The widowed empress Viquara sees an opportunity to provide the Eubian Concord with an heir without losing her political power.

Viquara's soldiers find and kidnap Jaibriol. Viquara installs him as a "puppet emperor" with she and her new husband Quaelen wielding the power from behind the throne. Soz hides her children on Earth in the custody of former family member Seth Rockworth (once married to Dehya as part of the Icelandic Accord) and returns to Skolia to assume her rightful position as the new Imperator. To get her husband back and save her people from the power-hungry Aristo caste of Eube, she launches an attack that will become known as the Radiance War.
