= Catherine Asaro =

American science-fiction writer, singer and teacher (b. 1955)

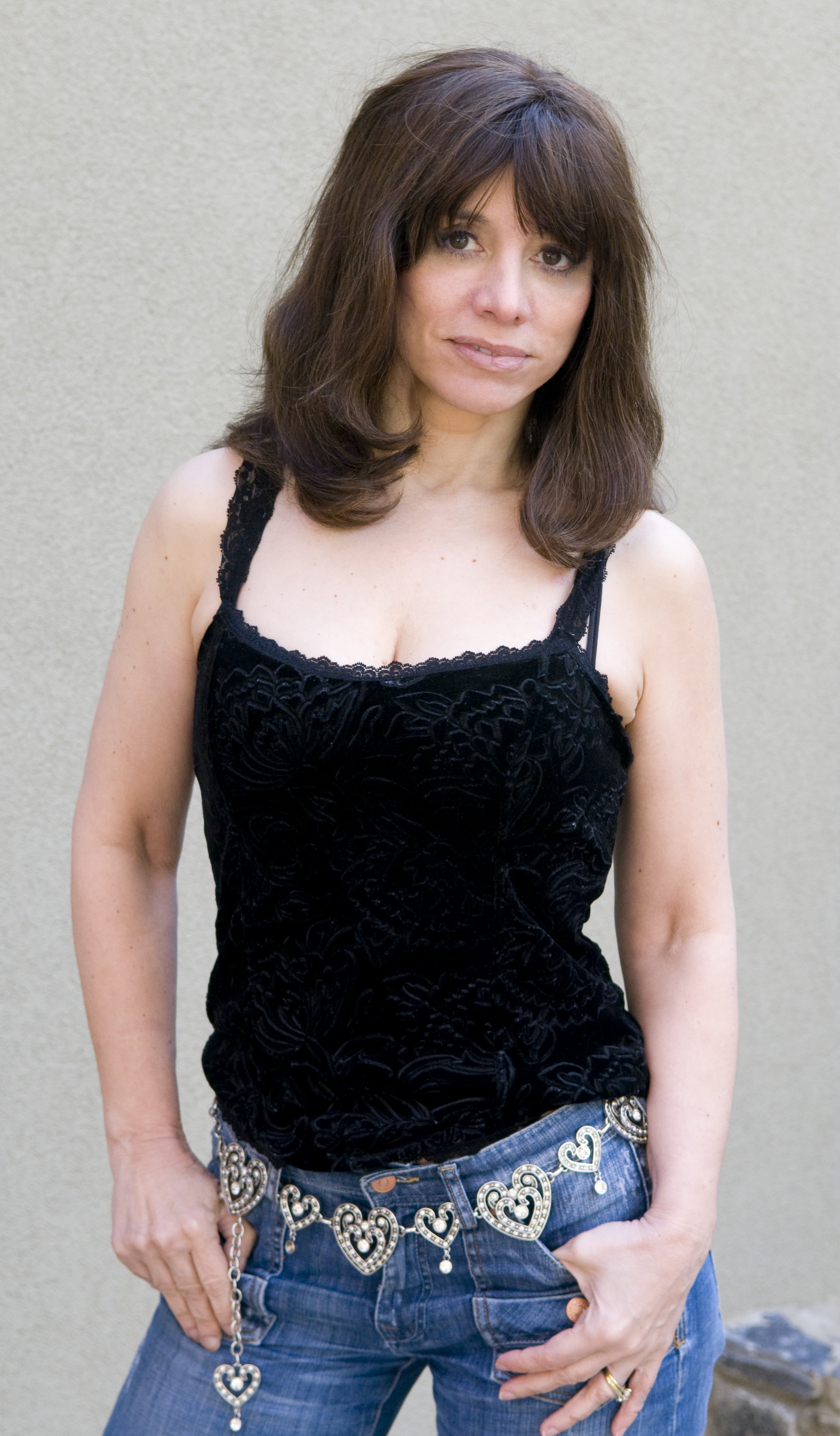
- Asaro in 2009
- Born: November 6, 1955 (age 71); Oakland, California, U.S.
- Education: UCLA (BS); Harvard University (MA, PhD)
- Occupation: Writer
- Spouse: John Kendall Cannizzo (m. 1986; died 2018)
- Children: 1
- Relatives: Frank Asaro (father)
- Writing career
- Genres: Science fiction, fantasy
- Notable work: Saga of the Skolian Empire
- Notable awards: Nebula Award (2001, 2008)
- Website: catherineasaro.net

Catherine Ann Asaro (born November 6, 1955) is an American science fiction and fantasy author, singer, teacher, and dancer. She is best known for her books about the Ruby Dynasty, called the Saga of the Skolian Empire.

== Early life and education ==
Catherine Asaro was born on November 6, 1955, in Oakland, California, and grew up in El Cerrito, California. She attended Kennedy High School in Richmond, California, as part of the Richmond Voluntary Integration Plan. She has a B.S. with highest honors in chemistry from UCLA, and both a master's in physics and a PhD in chemical physics from Harvard University.

== Career ==
When not writing and making appearances at conventions and signings, Asaro teaches math, physics, and chemistry. She was director of the Chesapeake Math Program and has coached various nationally ranked teams with home, private, and public school students, in particular the Chesapeake teams for national tournaments such as PUMaC and HMMT. She also taught a gifted program in math and science at the Yang Academy in Gaithersburg, Maryland. Her students have placed at the top levels in numerous national competitions, including USAMO and USAMTS.

Asaro is a member of SIGMA, a think tank of speculative writers that advises the government as to future trends affecting national security. She is also known for her advocacy of bringing girls and women into STEM fields and for increased diversity, and for challenging gender roles and literary expectations in her fiction. She has been an invited speaker or visiting professor for various institutions, including the National Academy of Sciences, Harvard, Georgetown University, NASA, AAAS, The Global Competitiveness Forum in Saudi Arabia, the New Zealand National ConText Writer's program, the University of Maryland, the US Naval Academy, and many other institutions.

A former ballet and jazz dancer, Catherine Asaro has performed with dance companies and in musicals on both coasts and in Ohio. She founded and served as artistic director and a principal dancer for two dance groups at Harvard: The Mainly Jazz Dance Company, which was also the parent company of the Harvard University Ballet. After she graduated, her undergraduate students took over Mainly Jazz and made it into a club at the college. In 1993, the Harvard University Ballet became a separate group called the Harvard Ballet Company.

From 2003 to 2005, Asaro completed two terms as president of Science Fiction and Fantasy Writers of America (SFWA) and during her tenure established the Andre Norton Award for Young Adult Science Fiction and Fantasy.

== Personal life ==
Asaro's father was nuclear chemist Frank Asaro.

In 1986, Asaro married John Kendall Cannizzo (born 1957), an astrophysicist at NASA. He died in 2018.

Asaro has a daughter, Catherine "Cathy" Cannizzo (born circa 1990). Cathy completed a bachelor's and master's in mathematics at the University of Cambridge, followed by a 2019 PhD in Geometry / Geometric Analysis at UC Berkeley.

== Saga of the Skolian Empire series ==
The Saga of the Skolian Empire, informally called the Skolian Saga, is a series of science fiction novels, novellas, and novelettes revolving around characters from an interstellar empire known as the Skolian Empire and its power struggle with the rival Eubian Concord. The arc of the books unfolds over several generations of characters and revolves around political intrigues, but also contains subplots regarding romance, physics, bio-enhancements, and virtual computer networks.

== Mathematical fiction and hard science fiction ==
Asaro is known as a hard science fiction writer for the scientific depth of her work. The amount of science varies from book to book, with novels such as Primary Inversion, The Radiant Seas, and Spherical Harmonic on the most scientifically dense end of the spectrum, including elements such as equations and diagrams of quantum mechanical wave functions and Klein bottles. Stanley Schmidt, the long time editor of Analog magazine, wrote that Primary Inversion is "an impressive first novel; not just a good story, but the kind of speculation we too seldom see – really new science that just might be possible." Asaro is noted as one of the few female science fiction writers who also has a doctorate in hard science, in Asaro's case a PhD from Harvard in theoretical Chemical Physics.

Asaro is also noted for including sophisticated mathematical concepts in her fiction. The method of space travel used in the Skolian Empire books comes from a paper Asaro wrote on complex variables and special relativity that appeared in the American Journal of Physics. The novel Spherical Harmonic involves an imagined universe based on the Hilbert space described by the spherical harmonic eigenfunctions that solve the Laplace Equation, and some prose in the book is written in the shape of the sinusoidal waves found in the spherical harmonics. Her novel The Quantum Rose is an allegory to quantum scattering theory and is dedicated to her doctoral advisors and mentors in the subject, Alex Dalgarno, Kate Kirby, and Eric J. Heller. The novella "Aurora in Four Voices" includes topics ranging from Fourier series to integration problems in calculus. In essays in the back of some of her novels, Asaro explains the mathematical and physics basis of the ideas used in the books, in particular Spherical Harmonic, The Quantum Rose, and The Moon's Shadow. In the anthology Aurora in Four Voices (which includes the novella of the same name), Asaro describes the mathematical basis of several stories in the anthology, including the use of Fourier transforms, Riemann sheets, and complex numbers in "The SpaceTime Pool."

== Musical collaborations ==
=== The Diamond Star Project ===
The Diamond Star Project is a collaboration between Catherine Asaro and the rock musicians Point Valid. The project resulted in a CD, Diamond Star (Starflight Music, April 2009), which is a "soundtrack" for the book, Diamond Star (Baen Books). The novel tells the story of Del-Kurj, a Ruby Dynasty prince who would rather be a rock singer than sit on the throne. The lyrics to the songs appear in the novel Diamond Star and were the inspiration for the CD.

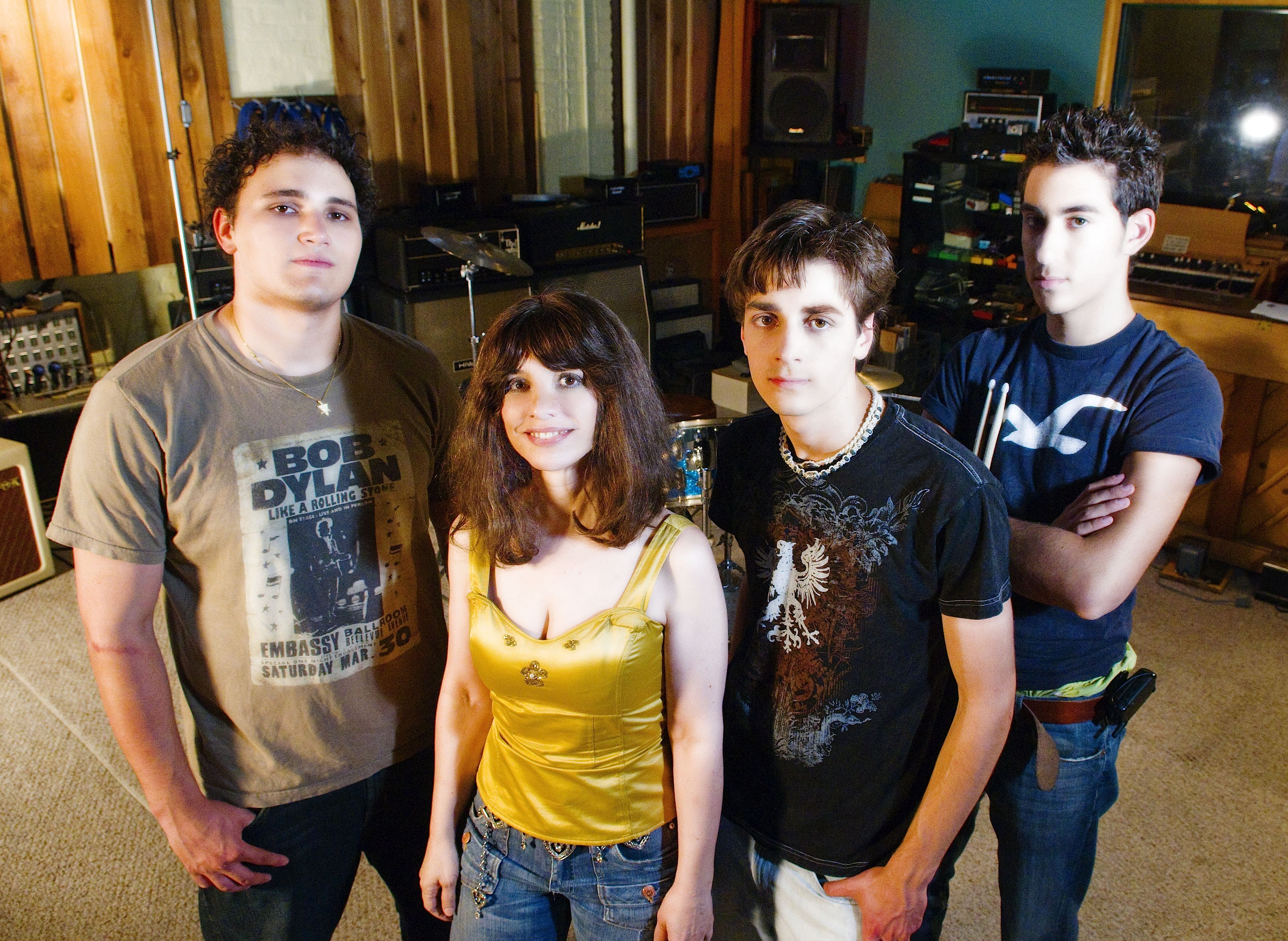
Point Valid with Catherine Asaro (2008)

Point Valid is an alternative band originating in Baltimore, Maryland, with Hayim Ani on vocals and guitar, Adam Leve on drums and Max Vidaver on guitar. Ani wrote most of the music for the CD, and Asaro wrote most of the lyrics, as well as music for three songs. Ani also contributed three original compositions, both music and lyrics. Most of the vocals are by Ani, with a few by Asaro. The CD has twelve songs, eleven originals and a cover of "Sound of Silence". Asaro, who did not know how to sing, took voice lessons in preparation for the recordings, and continues to train and perform. Asaro has described how the collaboration inspired her work, as exemplified by the song "Emeralds", which she was not able to finish until she and Ani were in the studio recording his vocals.

During 2009, the Diamond Star Project expanded to include Donald Wolcott, a jazz pianist who accompanied Asaro in concerts. In 2010, Starflight Music released the EP Goodbye Note by Asaro and Wolcott, which includes the song "No Answers with in Paradisum" from the Diamond Star soundtrack, rewritten and sung by Asaro. In 2010, Marty Pell joined the Diamond Star Project as an additional pianist, and in 2011, Greg Adams replaced Wolcott as Asaro's primary accompanist.

=== Arlan Andrews ===
In 2018, Asaro teamed up with author and songwriter Arlan Andrews to do the Celtic rock song "Ancient Ages".

== Awards ==
- Primary Inversion, nominee, Locus Award, first novel, 1996
- Primary Inversion, finalist, Compton Crook Award 1996
- Catch the Lightning, winner, Sapphire Award, best novel, 1997
- Catch the Lightning, winner, UTC Readers Choice Award, best novel, 1997
- Catch the Lightning, finalist, Audies, Science Fiction, 2003
- The Last Hawk, nominee, Nebula Award, Best Novel, 1999
- The Radiant Seas, winner, RT Book Club Reviewer's Choice Award, Best Science Fiction Novel 1999
- The Radiant Seas, nominee, HOMer Award, Best Novel 2000
- "Aurora in Four Voices", winner, AnLab (Analog Reader's Poll), 1999
- "Aurora in Four Voices", nominee, Hugo Award, best novella, 1999
- "Aurora in Four Voices", nominee, Nebula Award, best novella, 1999
- "Aurora in Four Voices", winner, HOMer Award, best novella, 1999
- "Aurora in Four Voices", winner Sapphire Award, best novella, 2000
- "Aurora in Four Voices", nominee, Seiun Awards, overseas short fiction, 2000
- "Aurora in Four Voices", Sixth Place, Locus Award, novella, 1999
- The Veiled Web, winner, HOMer Award, best novel, 2000
- The Veiled Web, winner, Prism Award, best novel, 2000
- The Veiled Web, winner, National Reader's Choice Award, 2000
- The Veiled Web, Second Place, Sapphire Award, 2001
- The Quantum Rose, winner, Nebula Award for Best Novel 2001
- The Quantum Rose, winner, Affaire de Coeur Award, Best Science Fiction (2001)
- The Quantum Rose, Third place, Sapphire Award, Best Novel 2000
- The Quantum Rose, nominee, Audies, Novel 2005
- "A Roll of the Dice", winner, AnLab (Analog Reader's Poll), 2001
- "A Roll of the Dice", winner, HOMer Award, 2001
- "A Roll of the Dice", nominee, Hugo Award, best novella, 2001
- "A Roll of the Dice", nominee, Nebula Award, best novella, 2001
- "A Roll of the Dice", Second Place tie, Sapphire Award, best novella, 2001
- Spherical Harmonic, winner, Affaire de Coeur Reader/Writer Poll for Best Futuristic, 2002
- "Ave de Paso", Eleventh Place, Locus Award, novella, 2002
- "Ave de Paso", nominee, Sapphire Award, Short Fiction, 2002
- "Soul of Light", nominee, short fiction, Gaylactic Spectrum Awards, 2002
- Ascendant Sun, winner, RT Book Club Reviewer's Choice Award, Best Science Fiction Novel 2003
- Skyfall, winner, RT Book Club Reviewer's Choice Award, Best Science Fiction Novel 2003
- Skyfall, finalist, Rita Award, Futuristic/Fantasy/Paranormal, 2004
- Skyfall, Third Place, Sapphire Award, Best Novel, 2004
- "Moonglow," winner, RRA Award, Best Novella, 2004
- "Moonglow," winner, Sapphire Award, Best Novella, 2004
- "Walk in Silence", winner, AnLab (Analog Reader's Poll), 2004
- "Walk in Silence", winner, Prism Award, best novella, 2004
- "Walk in Silence", nominee, Hugo Award, best novella, 2004
- "Walk in Silence", nominee, Nebula Award, best novella, 2004
- Outstanding Achievement Award, WRW, Washington D.C., 2005
- "Stained Glass Heart", nominee, Sapphire Award, Best Novella, 2005
- "The City of Cries", winner, Prism Award, Best Novella, 2006
- "The City of Cries", winner, Prism Award, The Best of the Best, 2006
- "The City of Cries", winner, Book Buyers Best, novella, 2006
- "The City of Cries", Second Place, Sapphire Award, Best Novella, 2006
- "The Misted Cliffs", finalist, Rita Award, Paranormal, 2006
- "The Spacetime Pool," winner, Nebula Award for Best Novella 2008
- "The Spacetime Pool," second place, AnLab (Analog Reader's Poll), 2008
- Sunrise Alley, finalist, Audies, Science Fiction, 2009
- "Deep Snows," Nominee, Best R&B Music Video, World Music and Independent Film Festival, 2012
- "The Pyre of New Day," nominee, Nebula Award, best novelette, 2012
- The Wallace S. North, Jr., PE Award for Contributions to the Maryland State Mathcounts Program, 2017
- "Ancient Ages," The Blast-FM top 100, radio selection, 2020
