= The Collected Stories of Vernor Vinge =

Short story collection by Vernor Vinge

- Author: Vernor Vinge
- Genre: Science fiction
- Publisher: Tor Books
- Publication date: 17 November 2001
- Publication place: United States
- Media type: Print (hardback)
- Pages: 464 (hardback 1st edition)
- ISBN: 0-312-87373-5
- OCLC: 48223605
- Dewey Decimal: 813/.54 21
- LC Class: PS3572.I534 A6 2001

The Collected Stories of Vernor Vinge is a collection of science fiction short stories by American writer Vernor Vinge. The stories were first published from 1966 to 2001, and the book contains all of Vinge's published short stories from that period except "True Names" and "Grimm's Story".

== Stories ==
=== "Bookworm, Run!" ===
Originally published in Analog Science Fiction Science Fact, 1966.

The United States government has experimented with intelligence amplification by connecting a chimpanzee named Norman Simmons to an electronic memory bank. However, they have accidentally cross-connected the experimental computer with the government's main databank. Norman is able to access all data known to the USG, including fictional stories. Believing he will be severely punished if caught, he uses his information access advantageously to evade government forces and escape from the lab in which he was held.

Norman remains remotely connected to the government computers, and due to their own security systems, he cannot be disconnected. With the aid of stories that are linked to his mind, he formulates a plot to flee to Canada with the assistance of nearby Soviet agents. The Soviets are captured, however; Norman runs away, but strays too far for the data link with the computer to be maintained and reverts to an ordinary animal.

The Americans resolve not to try this experiment on a human, fearing that a human being augmented like Norman could conquer the world. The captured Russians have their memories read and erased, however, revealing that the USSR already enhanced a dog with similar results and is planning to next enhance one of its leaders. The American officials fear that they must now do so to keep up with the Soviets.

=== "The Accomplice" ===
Originally published in Worlds of If Science Fiction, 1967.

Bob Royce, CEO of Royce Technology, Inc., and his security officer Arnold Su have discovered that one of their employees has embezzled 4 million dollars' worth of computer time. The evidence points to Howard Prentice, a 90-something renaissance man doing computer science research for the company. Prentice reveals that he has used the computers to create a 4-hour computer-generated film adaptation of J.R.R. Tolkien's The Lord of the Rings. This file is the culmination of a 30-year project by Prentice and his wife Moira to turn film into an art form which can be produced by individual artists.

=== "The Peddler's Apprentice" ===
Originally published in Analog Science Fiction Science Fact, 1975. Written in collaboration with Joan D. Vinge.

Describes the arrival of a peddler, Jagit Katchetooriantz, who travels into the future to sell his wares. The peddler travels into the future by placing himself in a stasis field and emerging from time to time. The peddler sells items from the previous civilization to the current civilization, hence he is dependent upon a changing civilization to create demand for his goods. During this visit the peddler encounters a planetary government which is dedicated to preventing any changing in civilization by maintaining the majority of humanity at subsistence level. This government captures Jagit and attempts to interrogate him using their global computer network. However, the people who run this government and the computer network have survived from Jagit's last visit and he knows the passwords and codes to control it. Jagit uses this power to destroy the network and the government freeing humanity from its authority. He returns to his stasis field at the end of the story to continue his travel into the future.

=== "The Ungoverned" ===
Originally published in Far Frontiers, Baen Books, 1985.

Falls in the Across Realtime series between the novels The Peace War and Marooned in Realtime. Set in a future market anarchist American society, composed solely of independent individuals and private organizations. Security and police services are provided by organizations like Al's Protection Racket and Michigan State Police (MSP). There is at least one remaining nation-state, the Republic of New Mexico, which has territorial ambitions on Kansas. This invasion is repelled by the cooperation of the MSP and other private individuals defending their personal interests.

=== "Long Shot" ===
Originally published in Analog Science Fiction Science Fact, 1972.

Description of a voyage from Earth to Alpha Centauri by an automated, AI controlled colony ship. The ship is launched as a "long shot" to preserve the human race because the Earth is going to be destroyed by a rapidly expanding sun. Ilse, the AI, carries human zygotes on a ten thousand-year trip to search for a suitable planet around Alpha Centauri. Despite deteriorating hardware which causes her to "forget" the entire purpose of the mission, she is able to make inferences and use her remaining functional components to complete the mission. Vinge states his interest in writing a sequel depicting the lives of the humans born on this world.

=== "Apartness" ===
Originally published in New Worlds SF, 1965.

Set in a world where the Northern Hemisphere has been devastated by nuclear war, and nations in the Southern Hemisphere are now dominant. A scientific fleet from the Southern American Empire is investigating Antarctica and discovers an isolated tribe of humans. It is eventually determined that the tribe is descended from the only group of Afrikaners to escape from South Africa after a genocide of all white Africans after the northern hemisphere's nuclear war. This was Vinge's first story accepted for publication.

=== "Conquest by Default" ===
Originally published in Analog Science Fiction Science Fact, 1968.

This story is set in the same world as "Apartness" but farther in the future, where an alien civilization, the Mikin, have made contact with Earth. The Mikin culture is a newly star-faring and profit-driven anarchy. The Mikin's technology is significantly advanced beyond that of humanity, and their culture is vastly diverse due to an ingrained acceptance of differences.

=== "The Whirligig of Time" ===
Originally published in Stellar One, Ballantine Books, 1974.

The story opens with a description of an attack on the unidentified losing side of a nuclear exchange. Ballistic missiles rain down on military installations, while smuggled bombs destroy cities. Over the next centuries the winning side of this conflict forms an oppressive Solar System wide empire. The rest of the story is set in space on the occasion of the imperial heir's 18th birthday celebration, at which the emperor and most of the aristocracy is present. During the party, a descendant of the losing side (who is employed as a "pet" slave/jester by the prince) alerts the ship's captain to an interesting object orbiting Earth, knowing the prince's penchant for collecting space debris. The captain is instructed to divert towards the object, and soon realizes that the object is a nuclear weapon from the original war. He decides not to change his course or inform others of this, believing that his death in the collision will be worth the elimination of the empire's elite to free the Solar System from its tyranny.

=== "Bomb Scare" ===
Originally published in Analog Science Fiction Science Fact, 1970.

During a battle in which one colonizing species is about to use a mass-energy converter to destroy the main planet of a solar system they wish to conquer, an unknown craft appears intent upon doing the same to the system's star. This unknown craft belongs to a species which has "supervised its own evolution for more than 100,000 years" and the conversion of the star would destroy the entire galaxy. The unknown craft is crewed by only two beings, and before they can destroy the star their mother appears behind them demanding to know what they are doing. At the mother's appearance it revealed that this species are the far-future descendants of humanity.

=== "The Science Fair" ===
Originally published in Orbit 9, G. P. Putnam's Sons, 1971.

In a feudal society, scientific research is guarded at all times by the House which funded it, except during the "Science Fair". The Fair is an event held once a generation where scientific research is made public. One of the scientists reveals that he has discovered a star which is coming nearer to their world. He advocates that all scientific research must be made public and non-proprietary if the planet is to be able to cope with the nearest approach of this star. This story follows the agent who is hired to keep the scientist from being assassinated before he makes his presentation of his findings.

=== "Gemstone" ===
Originally published in Analog Science Fiction Science Fact, 1983.

Sandra goes to stay with her grandmother and discovers that she possesses an artifact, the Gemstone, that was found by her grandfather in Antarctica. The object is a skull-sized rock, that emits feelings of cold and desolation, which are assumed to be memories of Antarctica, and can convert plastic into diamonds. These diamonds have supported Sandra's grandmother since her grandfather's death, but they also prompt some young men to break into her house and attempt to extort the cache of rough diamonds they assume she must have. During the break-in the house catches fire and the Gemstone is exposed to the fire. The heat causes the Gemstone, which turns out to be a creature, to become mobile, active, and happy while it is in the fire. As the fire burns out it returns to its dormant cold state.

=== "Just Peace" ===
Originally published in Analog Science Fiction Science Fact, 1971. Written with William Rupp.

Chente is an agent of the Canadian Hegemony, a society which has advanced far beyond current understanding (passing what Vinge refers to as the technological singularity). He is duplicated 19 light-years from Earth on the colony New Canada which is at current levels of technology. The planet is about to undergo a core collapse which will likely destroy the entire colony. The first time, he fails to report back and is assumed to have been killed.

The story begins with his second duplication. He discovers that there are at least two warring factions in the colony (with traitors and double agents) who intend on destroying each other, and that both factions claim his first duplicate had teamed up with one and was killed by the other. He realizes that the only way to force the colonists to work together and build an industrial base that will deal with the disaster is to set himself up as an enemy to all, by attacking and disabling the nuclear weapons of both sides. This will be possible with the superior technology that he has managed to bring with him.

=== "Original Sin" ===
Originally published in Analog Science Fiction Science Fact, 1972.

The Shimans are a species whose individuals live only two and a half Earth-years, are extremely intelligent, and experience a ravenous hunger throughout their lives before dying in a parthenogenetic frenzy as their thousands of young devour them from within. They have progressed from paleolithic to industrial age in the two centuries since contact with humanity. Earth's government works to keep the Shimans isolated on their planet because of the belief that the Shimans' hunger and fast life-cycle would cause them to overrun the galaxy.

A human researcher is employed to develop a longevity treatment for the Shimans. The organization backing the researcher wants the Shimans to progress in order to provide a worthy competitor to humanity, forcing them to improve and adapt. A policewoman is bribed to shield his activities from the Earth government monitors which detect electronic activity from the air. She turns out to be doing this because she agrees with the Earth government view. Their Shiman conspirator concurs that Shimans are intrinsically evil: despite some of them adopting Christianity and wanting to be "good" in the way that humans can be, they have been unable to overcome their violent and cannibalistic urges towards each other and anything else that can be eaten. The policewoman is helping the researcher as she wants him to develop his treatment but insert a failsafe to prevent the Shimans living long enough to develop space travel and transplant their life-cycle to other planets.

=== "The Blabber" ===
Originally published in Threats... and Other Promises, Baen Books, 1988.

On a human colony planet named Middle America, just inside the Slow Zone, lives Hamid, and his unique pet, the Blabber. While Hamid is working with tourists from the Beyond in an attempt to get out of the Slow Zone, another visitor, Ravna&Tines comes to the planet, offering to buy the Blabber from him. When Hamid does not accept their deal expediently, Ravna&Tines launch attacks on the planet and the Beyond tourists. Hamid and the Blabber eventually end up with Ravna&Tines and head into the Beyond.

The story occurs in the Zones of Thought universe and occurs after The Children of the Sky. Tines is a member of the multi-part species introduced in A Fire Upon the Deep, the tines, and the Blabber is a missing member of Tines who is re-incorporated at the end of the story. Hamid is a clone of a great man who was in a relationship with Ravna.

=== "Win a Nobel Prize!" ===
Originally published in Nature 407(6805), 2000.

This is a letter offering a position to a researcher with an organization that will provide him with a mind-machine interface, implemented by a non-reversible tailored infection and manipulated with MRI. The letter describes other organizations using the technique to induce any psychopathology, but promises to transform the researcher into an idiot savant in his field. It is hinted that the researcher has already been infected.

The technology also appears in the novel A Deepness In the Sky used by the Emergents, a totalitarian, slave-based culture.

=== "The Barbarian Princess" ===
Originally published in Analog Science Fiction Science Fact, 1986. This is the first section of the novel Tatja Grimm's World.

Rey Guille operates a shipboard publishing company which sails from market to market. At one port they discover Tatja Grimm, ignorant but unexpectedly intelligent, who is a perfect match for the character Hrala, Barbarian Princess. When the ship runs into trouble at one of their ports of call with the Termite Folk, who take this fiction very seriously, Tatja is used to bluff an escape.

=== "Fast Times at Fairmont High" ===
First appearance in this collection. It occurs in the same milieu as Rainbows End.

Fairmont High is an advanced high school in a future where everyone has access to almost unlimited computation and bandwidth. A distributed network of tiny nodes (akin to the localizers in Rainbows End), which can be found on clothing and all over streets and houses, allows people to superimpose an augmented reality on their real environment, as well as be virtually present as a hologram anywhere in the world where the nodes are available. Most students learn via distance education but are able to attend physically when asked. One exception is Bertie Todd who lives halfway across the US. Bertie has contacts in Siberia and admits to being on a committee that controls a distance learning graduate "student" at MIT. It is hinted that Bertie is a virtual entity himself, though Juan Orozco has visited his home virtually and cannot see why anyone would fake that.

Fairmont High believes that it is important that their students be able to operate both on-line and off-line; thus, one of their exams must be completed while isolated from the network. This exam is a project of the students' choosing, and one grading criterion is to generate income for the school. It turns out that Bertie has been subtly manipulating some students, and entices Miriam Gu to team up with Juan despite them never having spoken before and their different personalities (another positive grading criterion). Bertie has also been supplying Juan with memory-enhancing drugs which enable him to structure large queries to the network in ways that ordinary people cannot, and Juan has been helping him with some of his outside research.

Miriam has decided to investigate strange goings-on in Torrey Pines State Natural Reserve for their project. Nodes are not permitted because of the toxic components that would remain when they failed. Just before they go offline, Bertie mail-drops (via FedEx personal rocket) some new biodegradable network nodes that his MIT persona has been developing. He asks Juan to test them in the forest as part of his unlimited exam, where projects can make use of any resources available (doing two projects concurrently is a third positive grading criterion). Bertie does not tell Juan how to interact with the nodes' software, in the hope that Juan will be forced to send a high-powered signal from inside the forest to ask for outside help – not only failing the offline restriction of the exam, but also allowing Bertie to receive data from the nodes and steal Miriam and Juan's project.

Miriam and Juan are accompanied into the forest by William, her grandfather who is growing a new nervous system and personality as part of an Alzheimer's treatment. Using video from the nodes, which are mistaken for food, they discover a group of intelligent mice who have burrowed a series of tunnels into the gorge and formed a society. William thinks they are a secret lab experiment, but Miriam's observations and cached information sources lead her to believe that the mice are part of an upcoming summer interactive entertainment "movie" by FoxWarner. This allows Fairmont High to have an inside scoop on the movie and ensure a high grade for the students.

William captures some mice with the FedEx rocket (which he earlier broke, but repaired while the others were testing the new nodes). Instead of allowing Miriam to keep them as part of the project, he releases the rocket which flies back to the FedEx depot – from where the mice could escape into the world. Juan is forced to reveal his drug use as Miriam is suspicious about how he managed to learn Bertie's nodes' interface so quickly. The ensuing discussion leads Juan to realize that he himself is a project of Bertie's. Bertie has been supplying custom drugs to many people and has only really befriended Juan because the drugs have worked amazingly well in him. Juan decides to free himself from Bertie, and like the mice, find his own way in the world with his drug-enhanced talents.

This story won the Hugo Award for Best Novella in 2002.
