= 2002 in science fiction =

The year 2002 was marked, in science fiction, by the following:

== Events ==
- The 60th annual Worldcon, ConJose, was held in San Jose, USA

== Births and deaths ==
=== Deaths ===
- Damon Knight

== Literary releases ==
=== Novels ===
- Metro 2033, by Dmitry Glukhovsky
- Prey, by Michael Crichton

=== Short stories ===
==== Collections ====
- Stories of Your Life and Others, by Ted Chiang

=== Children's books ===
- Zathura, by Chris Van Allsburg

=== Comics ===
- Y: The Last Man #1, by Brian K. Vaughan and Pia Guerra

== Movies ==
- 28 Days Later, dir. by Danny Boyle
- Lilo and Stitch, dir. by Chris Sanders and Dean DeBlois
- Minority Report, dir. by Steven Spielberg
- Signs, dir. by M. Knight Shyamalan
- Spider-Man, dir. by Sam Raimi

== Television ==
- Firefly
- The Future is Wild

== Video games ==
- Metroid Prime
- Steel Battalion

== Awards ==
=== Hugos ===
- Best novel: American Gods, by Neil Gaiman
- Best novella: Fast Times at Fairmont High, by Vernor Vinge
- Best novelette: "Hell is the Absence of God" by Ted Chiang
- Best short story: "The Dog Said Bow-Wow" by Michael Swanwick
- Best related work: The Art of Chesley Bonestell, by Ron Miller and Frederick C. Durant III with Melvin H. Schuetz
- Best dramatic presentation: The Lord of the Rings: The Fellowship of the Ring, dir. by Peter Jackson; screenplay by Fran Walsh and Philippa Boyens & Peter Jackson; base on the book The Fellowship of the Ring by J.R.R. Tolkien
- Best professional editor: Ellen Datlow
- Best professional artist: Michael Whelan
- Best semiprozine: Locus, ed. by Charles N. Brown
- Best fanzine: Ansible, ed. by Dave Langford
- Best fan writer: Dave Langford
- Best fan artist: Teddy Harvia
- Best web site: Locus Online (locusmag.com) by Mark R. Kelly

=== Nebulas ===
- Best novel: American Gods by Neil Gaiman
- Best novella: Bronte's Egg, by Richard Chwedyk
- Best novelette: "Hell is the Absence of God" by Ted Chiang
- Best short story: "Creature" by Carol Emshwiller

=== Other awards ===
- BSFA Award for Best Novel: The Separation, by Christopher Priest
- Locus Award for Best Science Fiction Novel: Passage, by Connie Willis
- Saturn Award for Best Science Fiction Film: Minority Report
