= Cosmo Argento =

Italian sci-fi book series (1970–2007)

Cosmo Argento was a series of science fiction books published in Italy by Editrice Nord starting from October 1970. Differently from the similar re-prints collection Cosmo Oro, it usually consisted of translations of US books previously unpublished in the country. Authors included science fiction writers such as Philip José Farmer, Jack Vance, Frederik Pohl, John Brunner, Gordon R. Dickson, Larry Niven and many others. Original works by Italian authors were regularly published also.

The series reduced substantially in quality and frequency of publication in the 2000s, and ceased publication with issue #340 in February 2007 (The Collected Stories of Vernor Vinge by Vernor Vinge).
