= Group mind (science fiction) =

Plot device used in science-fiction stories

A group mind, group ego, hive mind, mind coalescence, or gestalt intelligence in science fiction is a plot device in which multiple minds, or consciousnesses, are linked into a single collective consciousness or intelligence.

== Overview ==
"Hive mind" tends to describe a group mind in which the linked individuals have no identity or free will and are possessed or mind-controlled as extensions of the hive mind. It is frequently associated with the concept of an entity that spreads among individuals and suppresses or subsumes their consciousness in the process of integrating them into its own collective consciousness. The concept of the group or hive mind is related to collective behaviour demonstrated by real-life superorganisms such as beehives or ant colonies, although individuals do not share a single collective intelligence.

The first alien hive society was depicted in H. G. Wells's The First Men in the Moon (1901) while the use of human hive minds in literature goes back at least as far as David H. Keller's The Human Termites (published in Wonder Stories in 1929) and Olaf Stapledon's science-fiction novel Last and First Men (1930), which is the first known use of the term "group mind" in science fiction. The phrase "hive mind" in science fiction has been traced to Edmond Hamilton's novel The Face of the Deep (published in Captain Future in 1942) referring to the hive mind of bees as a simile, then James H. Schmitz's Second Night of Summer (1950). A group mind might be formed by any fictional plot device that facilitates brain to brain communication, such as telepathy.

Some hive minds feature members that are controlled by a centralised "hive brain," "hive queen," or "overmind," but others feature a decentralised approach in which members interact equally or roughly equally to come to decisions. The packs of Tines in Vernor Vinge's A Fire Upon the Deep and The Children of the Sky are an example of such decentralized group minds.

Hive minds are typically viewed in a negative light, especially in earlier works, but some newer works portray them as neutral or positive.

As conceived in speculative fiction, hive minds often imply (almost) complete loss (or lack) of individuality, identity, and personhood. However, while the individual members of a group mind may not have such things, the group mind as a whole will have them, possibly even to a greater degree than individual people (just like a human has more personhood than a single neuron cell). The individuals forming the hive may specialize in different functions, similarly to social insects.

== Examples ==
In literature
Year	Source	Summary
1904	Born Again by Alfred Lawson	The narrator meets an underground race of telepathic superhumans who think as a group to solve difficult problems.
1929	The Human Termites by David H. Keller	A scientist discovers that termites are all parts of a bigger organism, all controlled by thousands years old central intelligences that plan to conquer the world.
1951	The Puppet Masters by Robert A. Heinlein	Slug-like parasitic aliens capable of controlling any organisms they attach themselves to spread among people as they adapt measures of exterminating them.
1953	More Than Human by Theodore Sturgeon	A revision and expansion of his novella "Baby Is Three" (1952) following a group of young outcasts with supernatural abilities, acting as a single organism called Homo gestalt, the next step in human evolution.
1960	Meeting of the Minds by Robert Sheckley	A scorpion-like alien named Quedak has a mission to unify diverse sentient beings into a single collective consciousness.
1982	Foundation's Edge by Isaac Asimov	While searching for Earth, Golan Trevize and Janov Pelorat find Gaia, an isolationist planet inhabited by a collective consciousness that encompasses all living and non-living things.
1985	Ender's Game by Orson Scott Card	Earth has been attacked by ant-like aliens called the Buggers. This species consists of hive-minded colonies controlled by queens.
1987	The Tommyknockers by Stephen King	An alien spacecraft gradually transforms the residents of a small Maine town into advanced, but soulless, beings who use alien technology powered by a form of collective, mental or psychic energy.
1992	A Fire Upon the Deep by Vernor Vinge	A human spacecraft lands on a planet of creatures called Tines. Each "individual" Tine is a pack of four or more dog-like creatures become a hive mind by exchanging thoughts via sound. A pack may gain or lose individual Tines and generally retain its personality, though each Tine has an impact on the pack's mind.
2004	A Hat Full of Sky by Terry Pratchett	An apprentice witch goes to stay with Constance Level, an older witch who has two bodies with a single mind between them.
2021	Leviathan Falls by James S.A. Corey	Promising a galaxy-spanning human civilization free of wars, conflict, prejudice, factionalism, and petty self interests, Winston Duarte attempts to unite the human race under an extremely authoritarian and autocratic interstellar empire. Realizing humanity's nature to oppose centralized authority and prediliction towards tribalism meant constant threat to his vision of a human galactic empire, Duarte decides to restore the alien Ring Builders' ancient hivemind to assume control of all human minds. Duarte argues that the only way to lead humanity into galactic dominance and save the human race from extinction is by erasing all individual agency.

In movies
Year	Source	Summary
1994	The Puppet Masters	Movie adaptation of the novel The Puppet Masters
2009	Eyeborgs	The network of camera-robots ODIN is filming everything and attacking anyone they deem a threat to their surveillance state but then fabricate video-evidence of something totally different taking place to cover the trails
2013	Ender's Game	Movie adaptation of the novel Ender's Game

In television
Year	Source	Summary
1989	Star Trek: The Next Generation episode "Q Who"	Introduced a recurring antagonist of the series, the Borg, a hive-mind alien group
2009	Star Wars: The Clone Wars episode "Brain Invaders"	Geonosian brain worms take over a spaceship. The infected form a hivemind controlled by Queen Karina the Great. Several other hive-mind species have appeared in the Star Wars canon.
2015	Rick and Morty episode "Auto Erotic Assimilation"	Introduced a hivemind character Unity
2016	Stranger Things seasons 2–5	Introduced a hive mind that connects together all "flayed" creatures and humans
2017	The Orville	The plot of the series contains an artificial race called Kaylon, whose members all form a hive mind
2021	Inside Job episode "Reagan & Mychelle's Hive School Reunion"	Based on Myc, a sentient mushroom-like being, going back to his "hive school" reunion, where students were part of a hive mind
2025	Pluribus	The plot of the series revolves around a hivemind that encompasses all people on Earth except for a few individuals

In video games
Year	Source	Summary
1998	StarCraft	The Zerg are a race of insectoids aliens obsessed with assimilating other races into their swarm. They form a hive-mind superorganism.
2001	Halo	The Flood is one of the primary antagonists of the Halo franchise. It is a parasitic alien that seeks to infect all sentient life.
2013	The Last of Us	The Cordyceps infection acts as a hive mind, with infected individuals linked through a massive underground, fungal mycelium network.
2017	Stellaris	A DLC allows players and AI empires to adopt the "Gestalt Consciousness" ethic, letting them play as a hive-mind.
2017	Destiny 2	The Witness is the entirety of the first civilization blessed by The Traveler amalgamated into one entity, and the central antagonist of the Destiny series' Light and Darkness saga.
2018	Kenshi	The Hive, also known as Hivers, are a race of stick-like humanoids who are meant to collaborate under a collective mind, ruled by a Hive Queen and her princes.
2023	Baldur's Gate 3	The Myconids, a species of conscious fungi located in the Underdark. They live in "circles": a collective consciousness that communicate through a song-like telepathy, speaking in visions and music.

== See also ==
- All Tomorrows#Summary
- Borg
- Brain–brain communication
- Brain–computer interface
- Collective intelligence
- Crowd psychology
- Deindividuation
- Global brain
- Groupthink
- Herd mentality
- Insectoids in science fiction and fantasy
  - Zerg, insectoid alien race in the StarCraft franchise
- "Legion", group of demons in Christian mythology and the New Testament
- Parasites in fiction
  - "Pod people", parasitoid alien race in the 1956 film Invasion of the Body Snatchers
  - Xenomorph, parasitoid alien race in the Alien and Alien vs. Predator franchises
- Sociobiology
- Swarm intelligence
- Telepathy
- Wisdom of the crowd
