= A Fire Upon the Deep =

1992 novel by Vernor Vinge

- Author: Vernor Vinge
- Cover artist: Boris Vallejo
- Language: English
- Series: Zones of Thought series
- Genre: Hard science fiction
- Publisher: Tor Books
- Publication date: April 1992
- Publication place: United States
- Media type: Print (hardcover and paperback)
- Pages: 391
- ISBN: 0-312-85182-0
- OCLC: 24671893
- Dewey Decimal: 813/.54 20
- LC Class: PS3572.I534 F57 1992
- Followed by: A Deepness in the Sky

A Fire Upon the Deep is a 1992 science fiction novel by American writer Vernor Vinge. It is a space opera involving superhuman intelligences, aliens, variable physics, space battles, love, betrayal, genocide, and a communication medium resembling Usenet. A Fire Upon the Deep won the Hugo Award in 1993, sharing it with Doomsday Book by Connie Willis.

Besides the normal print book editions, the novel was also included on a CD-ROM sold by ClariNet Communications along with the other nominees for the 1993 Hugo awards. The CD-ROM edition included numerous annotations by Vinge on his thoughts and intentions about different parts of the book, and was later released as a standalone e-book. It has a loose prequel, A Deepness in the Sky, from 1999, and a direct sequel, The Children of the Sky, from 2012.

== Setting ==
The novel is set in various locations within the Milky Way. The galaxy is divided into four concentric volumes called the "Zones of Thought"; it is not clear to the novel's characters whether this is a natural phenomenon or an artificially created one. Each Zone has fundamental differences in basic physical laws. One of the main consequences of these differences is the effect on intelligence. Artificial intelligence and automation is most directly affected, in that advanced hardware and software from the Beyond or the Transcend will work less well as a ship descends towards the Unthinking Depths. Biological intelligence is affected to a lesser degree.

The four zones are spoken of in terms of "low" to "high" as follows:

- The Unthinking Depths are the innermost zone, surrounding the Galactic Center. In it, only minimal forms of intelligence, biological or otherwise, are possible. This means that any ship straying into the Depths will be stranded, effectively permanently. Even if the crew did not die immediately—and some forms of life native to "higher" Zones would likely do so—they would be rendered incapable of human intelligence, leaving them unable to operate their ship in any way.
- Surrounding the Depths is the Slow Zone or Slowness. "Old Earth" is in this Zone, although Earth does not have a significant role in the story. Biological intelligence is possible in "the Slowness", but not true, sentient, artificial intelligence. Faster than light travel (FTL) is impossible in the Slow Zone. Faster-than-light communication is impossible into or out of the Slow Zone. As the boundaries of the Zones are subject to change, accidental entry into the Slow Zone is a major hazard at the "Bottom" of the Beyond. Starships which operate near the Beyond/Slow Zone border often have an auxiliary Bussard ramjet drive, so that if they accidentally stray into the Slow Zone, they will at least have a backup (sub-light) drive to try to reach the Beyond. Such ships also tend to include "coldsleep" equipment, as it is likely that any sort of return will still take many lifetimes for most species.
- The next layer outward is the Beyond, within which artificial intelligence, FTL travel, and FTL communication are possible. All human civilizations in the Beyond are descended from a single ethnic Norwegian group. The original settlement of this group is known as Nyjora. Other human settlements in the Beyond include Straumli Realm and Sjandra Kei. In the Beyond, FTL travel is accomplished by making numerous small "jumps" across space, with the efficiency of the drive increasing the further a ship travels from the galactic core. The Beyond is not a homogeneous zone; it includes the "High Beyond", "Middle Beyond", and the "Bottom of the Beyond", depending on distance from the galactic core. The Beyond is populated by a very large number of interstellar and intergalactic civilizations which are linked by an FTL communication network, "the Net", sometimes cynically called the "Net of a Million Lies". The Net is depicted as working much like the Usenet network in the early 1990s, with transcripts of messages containing header and footer information as one would find in such forums.
- The outermost layer, containing the galactic halo, is the Transcend, within which incomprehensible, superintelligent beings dwell. When a "Beyonder" civilization reaches the point of technological singularity, it can "Transcend", becoming a "Power". Such Powers always tend to relocate to the Transcend, seemingly necessarily, where they become engaged in activities which are entirely mysterious to those in the Beyond.

== Plot ==
Straumli Realm, a human civilization in the High Beyond, sends an expedition to investigate a newly discovered data archive that is located nearby in the Low Transcend. The researchers unknowingly awaken a superintelligence (later known as the Blight) contained in the data archive, and the entire High Lab facility slowly becomes compromised by it. Shortly before the Blight's final "flowering", two self-aware entities, created similarly to the Blight, plot to aid the humans before the Blight can gain its full powers. Once they finally recognize their danger, the High Lab researchers attempt to flee in two ships. The Blight destroys the ship containing most of the adults, but the second ship escapes, carrying the Olnsdot family and many High Lab children in coldsleep boxes.

Eventually, the surviving ship lands on a distant planet at the Bottom of the Beyond. The planet is populated by intelligent dog-like creatures, dubbed "Tines", who live in packs as group minds and have a level of technology comparable to the human Middle Ages. The two surviving High Lab adults, Arne and Sjana Olnsdot, are ambushed and killed almost immediately after landing by Tine fanatics known as Flenserists, in whose realm they have landed. The Flenserists capture their children, Jefri and Johanna. Johanna is quickly rescued from the Flenserists and taken to a neighboring kingdom, ruled by Woodcarver.

Meanwhile, Straumli Realm is taken over by the Blight and begins sending out propaganda on the Net. The company Relay, a major information provider for the Net, is positioned well to profit from the increase in Net traffic about the Blight and its activities. A Transcendent being named "Old One" contacts Relay, seeking information about the Blight and the humans who released it. Old One then reconstitutes a human named Pham Nuwen from the wreckage of a spaceship to act as its agent. Pham remains unsure if he is a construct or if his memories are real.

Ravna Bergsndot, Relay's only human employee, meets with two Skroderiders, plant-like aliens named Blueshell and Greenstalk, who are owner-operators of the merchant ship Out of Band II. They bring a rumor: a refugee ship escaped High Lab, and planned to send a distress signal from a planet in the Bottom of the Beyond. Relay finds the signal, establishes contact with Jefri Olnsdot, and contracts the Out of Band II to perform a rescue. Ravna is assigned to the mission as support from Relay, and later persuades her boss to let her join the crew on the ship.

Before preparation for the mission is complete, the Blight launches a surprise attack on Relay and kills Old One. As Old One dies, it warns Ravna through Pham and downloads information into Pham, which nearly kills him. Pham, Ravna and the Skroderiders barely escape Relay's destruction in the Out of Band II. During their journey to Tines' World, Ravna continues to communicate with Jefri. The Flenserist leaders, Steel and Tyrathect, have manipulated Jefri to believe that Woodcarver is his enemy, and Jefri convinces Ravna to help the Flenserists develop advanced technology such as cannons and radio to aid their war efforts. Meanwhile, Johanna and the knowledge stored in her kid-friendly learning device help Woodcarver's faction rapidly develop cannons as well.

While the Out of Band II races toward Tines' World, the Blight expands, taking over several civilizations, brainwashing their populations, and seizing archives in the Beyond. On the Net, some claim that humans are the means by which the Blight is able to spread, possibly having been created for the purpose. Anti-human fanatics destroy Sjandra Kei, the largest human civilization in the Beyond and Ravna's home. During a rest stop, Ravna and Pham learn that every member of the Skroderider species can be subverted by the Blight; this drives a wedge between the crew members. After escaping an ad hoc ambush at the rest stop by subverted Skroderiders, the Out of Band II is pursued by three fleets: anti-human fanatics, survivors from Sjandra Kei (calling themselves the Aniara Fleet), and a silent fleet controlled by the Blight. Ships from Sjandra Kei sacrifice themselves to delay the Blight and the anti-human ships, allowing the Out of Band II to reach Tines' World before the Blight does.

When the Out of Band II arrives at Tines' World, the crew allies with Woodcarver to defeat the Flenserists and rescue Jefri. Blueshell sacrifices himself to rescue Jefri. Pham, using the information downloaded into him by Old One, then initiates an anti-Blight Countermeasure, which had been smuggled from High Lab aboard the humans' ship. The Countermeasure extends the Slow Zone outward by thousands of light years. This envelops and destroys the Blight, but also crashes thousands of civilizations in the Beyond, causing trillions of deaths. The humans are stranded on Tines' World, now in the depths of the Slow Zone. Activating the Countermeasure proves fatal to Pham, but before he dies, the remnant of Old One reveals to him that, although his body is a reconstruction, his memories are indeed real.

== Related works ==
Vinge first used the concepts of "Zones of Thought" in a 1988 novella The Blabber, which occurs after Fire. Vinge's novel A Deepness in the Sky (1999) is a prequel to A Fire Upon the Deep set 20,000 years earlier and featuring Pham Nuwen. Vinge's The Children of the Sky, "a near-term sequel to A Fire Upon the Deep", set ten years later, was released in October 2011.

Vinge's former wife, Joan D. Vinge, has also written stories in the Zones of Thought universe, based on his notes. These include "The Outcasts of Heaven Belt", "Legacy", and (as of 2008) a planned novel featuring Pham Nuwen.

== Title ==
Vinge's original title for the novel was "Among the Tines"; its final title was suggested by his editors.

== Awards and nominations ==
Year	Award	Category	Results	Ref
1992	Nebula Award	Novel	Finalist	
1993	Campbell Memorial Award	—	Finalist	
1993	Hugo Award	Novel	Won (Note: Shared with Doomsday Book by Connie Willis)	
1993	Locus Award	Science Fiction Novel	Finalist	

== Critical reactions ==
Jo Walton wrote: "Any one of the ideas in A Fire Upon the Deep would have kept an ordinary writer going for years. For me it's the book that does everything right, the example of what science fiction does when it works. ... A Fire Upon the Deep remains a favourite and a delight to re-read, absorbing even when I know exactly what's coming."
