= Norman Simmons =

Norman Simmons or Simmonds may refer to:

- Norman Simmons (biochemist) (1915–2004), DNA research pioneer
- Norman Simmons (musician) (1929–2021), American jazz pianist and arranger
- Norman Simmons, character in Bookworm, Run!
- Norman Alan Simmons, in 2000 New Year Honours for food safety
- Norman Simmonds, fictional character
- Norman Symonds, composer
