= Children of the Sky =

Children of the Sky or The Children of the Sky may also refer to:

- The Children of the Sky, a 2011 novel by Vernor Vinge
- "Children of the Sky" (song), a 2023 song by Imagine Dragons
- "World, Hold On (Children of the Sky)", a 2006 song by Bob Sinclair
