= 60th World Science Fiction Convention =

60th Worldcon (2002)

ConJose, the 60th World Science Fiction Convention
- Genre: Science fiction
- Dates: 29 August–2 September 2002
- Venue: McEnery Convention Center; Fairmont San Jose; Hilton San Jose & Towers
- Location: San Jose, California
- Country: United States
- Filing status: Non-profit
- Website: fanac.org/conjose

The 60th World Science Fiction Convention (Worldcon), also known as ConJose, was held on 29 August–2 September 2002 at the McEnery Convention Center, the Fairmont San Jose, and the Hilton San Jose & Towers in San Jose, California, United States.

The convention was co-chaired by Tom Whitmore and Kevin Standlee and organized under the auspices of San Francisco Science Fiction Conventions.

== Participants ==
=== Guests of honor ===
- Vernor Vinge (writer)
- David Cherry (artist)
- Jan and Bjo Trimble (fans)
- Ferdinand Feghoot (imaginary)
- Tad Williams (toastmaster)

=== Other program participants ===
- Dafydd ab Hugh
- Roger MacBride Allen
- Karen Anderson
- Kevin J. Anderson
- Fiona Avery
- Kage Baker
- Steven Barnes
- Greg Bear
- Gregory Benford
- Carol Berg
- Terry Bisson
- Maya Kaathryn Bohnhoff
- Kent Brewster
- David Brin
- Terry Brooks
- Charles N. Brown
- Ginjer Buchanan
- Tobias Buckell
- Lois McMaster Bujold
- Pat Cadigan
- Orson Scott Card
- Jack L. Chalker
- Suzy McKee Charnas
- C. J. Cherryh
- James Clemens
- Brenda Clough
- Lori Ann Cole
- Ellen Datlow
- Keith R. A. DeCandido
- William C. Dietz
- Cory Doctorow
- Tom Doherty
- Gardner Dozois
- Teresa Edgerton
- Bob Eggleton
- Jane Fancher
- Nancy Farmer
- Lee Felsenstein
- Sheila Finch
- Michael F. Flynn
- Phil Foglio
- Robert L. Forward
- Richard Foss
- Alan Dean Foster
- Frank Kelly Freas
- David Gerrold
- Alexis Gilliland
- Mike Glyer
- Lisa Goldstein
- Kathleen Ann Goonan
- Jim Grimsley
- Eileen Gunn
- Joe Haldeman
- David Hartwell
- John G. Hemry
- Howard V. Hendrix
- P. C. Hodgell
- Nina Kiriki Hoffman
- Jordin Kare
- James Patrick Kelly
- Ellen Kushner
- Karin Lowachee
- Richard Lynch
- George R. R. Martin
- David Marusek
- Wil McCarthy
- Patricia A. McKillip
- Sean McMullen
- Robert A. Metzger
- China Miéville
- Ron Miller
- Steve Miller
- L. E. Modesitt, Jr.
- Rebecca Moesta
- Elizabeth Moon
- Jerry Oltion
- Fred Patten
- Diana L. Paxson
- Frederik Pohl
- Tim Powers
- Terry Pratchett
- Melanie Rawn
- Eric Raymond
- Robert Reed
- Mike Resnick
- Alastair Reynolds
- Jennifer Roberson
- Kim Stanley Robinson
- Rudy Rucker
- Richard Paul Russo
- Robert J. Sawyer
- Stanley Schmidt
- Bruce Schneier
- Karl Schroeder
- Lucius Shepard
- Robert Silverberg
- Sherwood Smith
- Henry Spencer
- Wen Spencer
- Allen Steele
- Sean Stewart
- Cliff Stoll
- Brad Templeton
- Mark W. Tiedemann
- Harry Turtledove
- Eric Van
- Gordon Van Gelder
- James Van Pelt
- Len Wein
- K. D. Wentworth
- Michelle Sagara West
- Sheila Williams
- Tad Williams
- Walter Jon Williams
- Connie Willis
- Robert Charles Wilson
- Gene Wolfe
- Steve Wozniak
- Frank Wu
- Chelsea Quinn Yarbro

=== Special appearance ===
Patrick Stewart made a special appearance at ConJose. He talked about upcoming films Star Trek Nemesis and X-Men 2, as well as his experiences on Star Trek: The Next Generation.

== Awards ==
The World Science Fiction Society administers and presents the Hugo Awards, the oldest and most noteworthy award for science fiction. Selection of the recipients is by vote of the Worldcon members. Categories include novels and short fiction, artwork, dramatic presentations, and various professional and fandom activities.

Other awards may be presented at Worldcon at the discretion of the individual convention committee. This has often included the national SF awards of the host country, such as the Japanese Seiun Awards as part of Nippon 2007, and the Prix Aurora Awards as part of Anticipation in 2009. The Astounding Award for Best New Writer and the Sidewise Award, though not sponsored by the Worldcon, are usually presented, as well as the Chesley Awards, the Prometheus Award, and others. In 2021, the Nommo Awards began presenting at Worldcon.

=== 2002 Hugo Awards ===
- Best Novel: American Gods by Neil Gaiman
- Best Novella: "Fast Times at Fairmont High" by Vernor Vinge (The Collected Stories of Vernor Vinge)
- Best Novelette: "Hell Is the Absence of God" by Ted Chiang (Starlight 3)
- Best Short Story: "The Dog Said Bow-Wow" by Michael Swanwick (Asimov's 10-11/01)
- Best Related Book: The Art of Chesley Bonestell by Ron Miller & Frederick C. Durant III, with Melvin H. Schuetz
- Best Dramatic Presentation: The Lord of the Rings: The Fellowship of the Ring
- Best Professional Editor: Ellen Datlow
- Best Professional Artist: Michael Whelan
- Best Semiprozine: Locus, edited by Charles N. Brown
- Best Fanzine: Ansible, edited by Dave Langford
- Best Fan Writer: Dave Langford
- Best Fan Artist: Teddy Harvia
- Best Website: Locus Online, Mark R. Kelly editor/webmaster

=== Other awards ===
- John W. Campbell Award for Best New Writer: Jo Walton

== Future site selection ==
Glasgow won the vote for the 65th World Science Fiction Convention to be held in 2005, as the only bid that filed.

== Committee ==
=== Co-chairs ===
- Tom Whitmore
- Kevin Standlee
  - Vice Chair/Controller: Cindy Scott
  - Vice Chair/Deliverables Manager: Craige Howlett

=== Division heads ===
- Events: John Blaker
- Exhibits: Larry Smith
- Facilities: David Gallaher, Nancy Cobb
- Fairy Godfather: David W. Clark
- Hospitality: Geri Sullivan
- Member Services: Elaine Brennan
- Programming: Kathryn Daugherty
- Publications: Bob Daverin, Brenda Daverin
- Support Services: Tony Cratz

=== Bid ===
- Kevin Standlee, bid chair

==== The "Coup" ====
In late 2001 and early 2002, some members of the SFSFC board expressed dissatisfaction about the progress made to date by convention management. It was proposed that the board remove Tom Whitmore as convention chair. The board decided to compromise by naming Tom Whitmore and Kevin Standlee as co-chairs of the convention.

== Notes ==
At the Hugo Awards presentation, Arthur C. Clarke gave a speech via direct video link from his home in Sri Lanka.

There was a Goth dance as well as a rock and roll dance at the convention (they took place on different nights).

== See also ==
- Hugo Award
- Science fiction
- Speculative fiction
- World Science Fiction Society
- Worldcon

Preceded by 59th World Science Fiction Convention; Millennium Philcon in Philadelphia, Pennsylvania, United States (2001)	List of Worldcons; 60th World Science Fiction Convention; ConJose in San Jose, California, United States (2002)	Succeeded by 61st World Science Fiction Convention; Torcon 3 in Toronto, Ontario, Canada (2003)
