= Cosmo Oro =

Italian sci-fi book series (1970–2002)

Cosmo Oro (subtitle: Classici della Fantascienza, "science fiction classics") was a series of science fiction books published in Italy by Editrice Nord starting from October 1970, usually consisting of re-prints. Authors translated (often with greater care for translation than in previous editions) included science fiction writers such as Philip K. Dick, Jack Vance, Robert A. Heinlein, Frank Herbert, Isaac Asimov, John Brunner, Alfred E. van Vogt and many others.

Cosmo Oro was paired by Cosmo Argento, which normally published works previously unpublished in Italy. The series reduced substantially in quality and frequency of publication in the 2000s, and ceased publication with issue #203 in April 2002 (The Andromeda Strain by Michael Crichton).
