= The Witling =

1976 novel by Vernor Vinge

- Cover of the first edition, published by DAW Books). Art by George Barr.
- Author: Vernor Vinge
- Language: English
- Publisher: DAW Books
- Publication date: 1976

The Witling is a 1976 science fiction novel by American writer Vernor Vinge, about the planet Giri, whose humanoid inhabitants, the Azhiri, are able to teleport. This ability varies from person to person: those without the talent at all are called witlings and are the lowest class of person in Azhiri society.

== Plot ==
Two human explorers become trapped on Giri. They struggle to find help from various powerful Azhiri factions. Each of these wish to exploit the relatively advanced technology the humans brought with them.

The humans also face the problem of getting to a place from which they can leave the planet. When the Azhiri teleport, they keep the same absolute motion they had at the point of departure. Since the planet is rotating, this is considerable and can be lethal for long distances.

== Reception ==
SF Signal praised Vinge's portrayal of Azhiri society, and his detailed extrapolation of how it would be affected by ubiquitous teleportation, but considered the characters to be largely "two-dimensional". The SF Site stated that it was "not the most original of stories, and (...) very much a work of its era", but praised its worldbuilding, which it compared to Anne McCaffrey's Pern; it also noted that the book "foreshadow(ed) (...) the themes that would become central to Vinge's later work" — specifically, a "widely scattered human diaspora" with worlds isolated from each other by the "crippling logistics of interstellar time and space".

James Nicoll similarly lauded the worldbuilding, but criticized the book for having "some fairly troglodytic gender politics", and declared that it was Vinge's worst novel.
