= Marooned in Realtime =

1986 novel by Vernor Vinge

- Cover of first edition (hardcover)
- Author: Vernor Vinge
- Cover artist: Thomas Kidd
- Language: English
- Series: Across Realtime
- Genre: Science fiction
- Publisher: Bluejay Books/ St. Martin's Press
- Publication date: September 1986
- Publication place: United States
- Media type: Print (Hardcover & Paperback)
- Pages: 270
- ISBN: 0-312-94295-8
- OCLC: 13920425
- Preceded by: "The Ungoverned"

Marooned in Realtime is a 1986 murder mystery and time-travel science fiction novel by American writer Vernor Vinge, about a small, time-displaced group of people who may be the only survivors of a technological singularity or alien invasion. It is the sequel to the novel The Peace War (1984) and the novella The Ungoverned (1985). The two novels and the novella were collected in Across Realtime.

Marooned in Realtime won the Prometheus Award in 1987 and was also nominated for the Hugo Award for Best Novel that same year.

== Plot summary ==
A bobbler is a device that can create a "bobble", a spherical stasis field in which time stands still for a specified length of outside time, allowing what is essentially one-way time travel into the future. The bobble can also be used as a weapon, a shield against other weapons, for storage, for space travel (combined with nuclear pulse propulsion), and other purposes.

People whose bobbles burst after a certain date in the 23rd century find the Earth completely devoid of human life, with only ambiguous clues as to the cause; possibilities include alien attack and humanity transcending to a new level of existence as a result of a technological singularity. The "low-techs" — those who bobbled earlier — have roughly late-21st-century technology. The "high-techs" — those who had the advantage of ever accelerating progress — have vastly superior technology, including cybernetic enhancements, faster and thought-controlled bobblers, personal automaton extensions of self, space ships, medical technology to allow practical immortality (barring accidents or fatal injuries), and individual arsenals greater than those of entire 20th century countries. Of the high-techs, even those who bobbled at slightly different times have significantly different technology levels.

The protagonist is Wil Brierson, a detective who is also the protagonist of the preceding novella, The Ungoverned. Some time after the events in The Ungoverned, Brierson was unwillingly bobbled 10,000 years into the future while he was investigating a routine theft, cutting him off forever from his wife and children.

Yelén and Marta Korolev, a high-tech couple, have spent 50 "megayears" (million years) gathering together all the survivors they can find to rebuild civilization, with the ultimate goal of creating their own technological singularity. They calculate that they will have just enough genetic diversity to keep humanity from going extinct once the bobble containing about a hundred members of the Peace Authority bursts.

When everyone bobbles ahead to the time that particular bobble will burst, and Marta is excluded from the automated bobbling due to the hacking of the Korolevs' computers. She is left stranded in "realtime", cut off from all advanced technology. Worse, the hacker extended the duration of the bobbling far beyond what was intended, and Marta dies alone on a deserted Earth. When the "murder" is discovered, Yelén Korolev recruits the low-tech Brierson, the only person with expertise in crime-solving, to find the killer. It has to be one of the seven high-techs (Brierson does not rule out Yelén herself as a suspect).

Della Lu, a high-tech who was an agent of the Peace Authority during The Peace War, agrees to assist Brierson with the technical aspects of the case. In the millions of years since the disappearance of humanity, Della had spent most of her 9,000 years alone, exploring the galaxy. She discovered that intelligent life is extremely rare, and there were parallel vanishings in the two long-gone civilizations she found, but no definitive proof of the cause. Singularities are implied to be an explanation for the Fermi Paradox.

The novel thus deals with the investigation of two parallel locked room mysteries: the murder of Marta Korolev, and the "locked planet" mystery of the fate of the human race. Brierson interviews each of the high-techs, seeking evidence of any motive for murder while discussing their views on why the human race vanished. When he makes the killer think he is getting too close, Brierson, Korolev and Della Lu are horrified to discover that all of the high-tech systems, except Della's, have been taken over. The combined, hijacked forces attack. Della is victorious, but at a ruinous cost: much of their equipment and about half of what remains of humanity are lost.

Brierson not only unmasks the murderer, he reveals the identity of another monster in their midst. The latter had sabotaged the Korolevs' medical equipment and a zygote bank, which they had planned to use to repopulate the world. Through skillful maneuvering (and a good deal of luck), Brierson manages to seize the monster's own hidden zygote bank and birthing equipment when the latter is forced to flee for his life, making it possible to restore the human race. Korolev devises a novel punishment for the killer.

== Reception ==
Publishers Weekly commented "as a mystery, this is a bust, in large part because only a few central characters are more than stick figures."

However, Kirkus delivered an opposite review stating that the novel was:

A marvelous extrapolative tale, to which no summary can do justice, with a gripping blend of high-tech razzle-dazzle and good old-fashioned murder-mystery--all spiced with that unique and awe-inspiring new twist on the time-travel theme.
