= The Ungoverned =

1985 novella by Vernor Vinge

- Short story by Vernor Vinge
- Language: English
- Genre: Science fiction

Publication
- Publication date: 1985
- Publication place: United States
- Media type: Print (Hardback & Paperback)

Chronology
- Series: Across Real Time
The Peace War	Marooned in Realtime

"The Ungoverned" is a 1985 science fiction novella by American writer Vernor Vinge, set between his novels The Peace War and Marooned in Realtime. It was first published in Far Frontiers, Volume III, first collected in True Names and Other Dangers, and later published in the 1991 edition of the omnibus Across Realtime (Baen Books, 1991). The novella is a direct exploration of the concept of privately funded decentralized defense in the absence of a State, as described by Gustave de Molinari in "The Production of Security".

== Plot summary ==
The Republic of New Mexico (NMR) invades the peaceful anarcho-capitalist society in Kansas. The NMR creates a military fiasco by completely failing to understand the cultural differences — including the amount of self-protection a lone Kansas farmer may have.

The protagonist is Wil W. Brierson, a detective/insurance agent, who attempts to disrupt the invasion while trying to minimize the property damage (and thus claims his company might have to pay out) and bridge the cultural gap. Brierson is also the protagonist of Marooned in Realtime.

== See also ==
- Anarcho-capitalist literature
