= The Cookie Monster (novella) =

2003 novella by Vernor Vinge

- Author: Vernor Vinge
- Language: English
- Genre: Hard science fiction
- Publisher: Analog
- Publication date: October 2003
- Publication place: United States
- Pages: c. 38

The Cookie Monster is a science fiction novella by American writer Vernor Vinge. It was first published in the October 2003 issue of Analog.

== Plot summary ==
The story begins following the first day of Dixie Mae Leigh's job as a customer support employee at a fictional company called Lotsatech. She receives an insulting and mysterious email and, in a fit of rage, decides to find out who sent it. Dixie Mae and fellow employee Victor search the Lotsatech campus looking for the author of the email, following clues in the email header. They meet up with Ellen, a grad student in computer science, who decides to try to help Dixie Mae.

While they talk, several mysteries arise and convince them that the email may be a kind of warning about something going on at Lotsatech involving a professor named Gerry Reich, who seems to be involved in all the projects on the campus. Ellen finds another clue in the email leading the three to another building where, to their utter astonishment, a second Ellen appears. The only explanation of this is that they are being simulated by a computer. Further clues from another person in the building lead them to an underground lab where they find two researchers working on improving methods of producing and preserving Bose–Einstein condensates.

When Dixie Mae and the Ellens reveal that they are all actually simulations, the researchers explore the email and find a clue that leads them to a 'cookie', a file that is passed from each iteration to the next with messages from the centuries of time they have been simulated over and over. They also find out that it was actually Dixie Mae herself who wrote the email in order to make it as offensive as possible to herself, allowing each iteration of the researchers to access the cookie. The story ends with a sad Dixie Mae realizing she cannot do anything herself to stop the endless cycle they are all in, but through the passing of information and ideas from one iteration to the next someday they will have the ability to stop the simulations.

== Reception ==
The Cookie Monster won the 2004 Hugo Award for Best Novella and the 2004 Locus Award for Best Novella, and was a finalist for the Nebula Award for Best Novella.

In the New York Times, Dave Itzkoff described it as "illustrat(ing) (...) the stultifying power of nostalgia", and compared Dixie Mae to Oedipa Maas; he also noted that "it is impossible to talk about the themes in a work of science fiction in any real way without ruining the surprise impact of its plot."

== See also ==
- Pantheon (TV series) - a 2022 series with a similar premise
- Simulated reality
