= Grimm's World =

1969 novel by Vernor Vinge

- First book edition, cover art by Paul Lehr
- Author: Vernor Vinge
- Language: English
- Publication date: 1969

Grimm's World is a 1969 science fiction novel by Vernor Vinge.

== Background ==
In 1968, Damon Knight published Vinge's novella "Grimm's Story" as part of Orbit 4. Knight told Vinge that if he expanded the novella to book-length, then he would get Vinge a contract with Berkley Books, where Knight worked as a science fiction editor. Vinge wrote an extension, and it became his first published novel. In 1987, Vinge revised the novel for Baen Books and added a new opening section, changing the title to Tatja Grimm's World.
