= Rainbows End (Vinge novel) =

2006 novel by Vernor Vinge

- First edition cover
- Author: Vernor Vinge
- Cover artist: Stephan Martinière
- Language: English
- Genre: Science fiction
- Publisher: Tor Books
- Publication date: May 16, 2006
- Publication place: United States
- Media type: Print (hardback & paperback)
- Pages: 368 pp. (first edition, hardback)
- Awards: Locus Award for Best Science Fiction Novel (2007)
- ISBN: 0-312-85684-9 (first edition, hardback)
- OCLC: 67711627
- Dewey Decimal: 813/.54 22
- LC Class: PS3572.I534 R35 2006

Rainbows End is a 2006 science fiction novel by Vernor Vinge. It was awarded the 2007 Hugo Award for Best Novel. The book is set in San Diego, California, in 2025, in a variation of the fictional world Vinge explored in his 2002 Hugo-winning novella "Fast Times at Fairmont High" and 2004's "Synthetic Serendipity". Vinge had some ideas for a sequel, picking up some of the loose threads left at the end of the novel. The many technological advances depicted in the novel suggest that the world is undergoing ever-increasing change, following the technological singularity, a recurring subject in Vinge's fiction and nonfiction writing.

== Plot summary ==
Thanks to advances in medical technology, Robert Gu is slowly recovering from Alzheimer's disease. As his faculties return, Robert (who has always been technophobic) must adapt to a different world, where almost every object is networked and mediated-reality technology is commonplace. Robert, formerly a world-renowned poet but with a notoriously mean-spirited personality, must also learn how to change and how to rebuild relationships with his estranged family. At the same time, Robert and his granddaughter Miri are drawn into a complex plot involving a traitorous intelligence officer, an intellect of frightening (and possibly superhuman) competence hiding behind an avatar of an anthropomorphic rabbit, and ominous new mind control technology with profound implications.

=== Augmented reality ===
In the novel, augmented reality is dominant, with humans interacting with virtual overlays of reality almost all of the time. This is accomplished by wearing smart clothing providing gesture recognition and contact lenses that can overlay and replace what the eye would normally see with computer graphics, using advanced virtual retinal display (VRD) technology. In addition, haptic feedback is possible by overlaying graphics onto a physical machine such as a robot. This augmentation of reality is used for a variety of purposes:

- Commercial (large gaming areas sell gaming environments mixed with haptics). The Cheapnet, a free entry-level service offered by commercial vendors of gaming solutions, can in principle also be used to coordinate networked augmented reality representations across the globe. However, jitter and latency are considerable problems with this basic network when long distances are involved. In the novel, Robert Gu develops an algorithm that partially compensates for these technical deficiencies, and might ultimately allow the inclusion of haptics.
- Functional (maintenance workers, for example, have access to a blueprint or schematic of practically any location or object in their responsibility area)
- Communication (characters in the novel use live video chat and can send and receive "silent messages", an action known as "sming", through their VRDs). Individuals can be reached through a globally implemented unique personal identifier, the ENUM.
- Medical (doctors have access to a patient's vital signs)

There are characters who choose not to "wear" these virtual overlays, instead using laptops, considered relics in the novel. A user's skill in managing and producing augmented reality manifests itself in the details of the augmentation. For example, a character might project himself into a different room, but the shadows cast by this apparition, or the collision between the character and the furniture in the room might give away the apparition.

=== Belief circles ===
There are many realities to choose from in the novel; however, the largest and more robust of them are built by large user bases in the manner of a wiki or Second Life. The confederation of users that contribute to the virtual world is called a belief circle. Several belief circles are presented in the novel, including worlds based on authors such as H. P. Lovecraft, Terry Pratchett, and the fictional Jerzy Hacek. Also mentioned are worlds based on the artwork of M. C. Escher, and fictional entertainment companies such as SpielbergRowling. The Egan Soccer set piece can also be seen as a type of subscribed Belief Circle.

== Themes ==
As in Vinge's other work, the concept of security in such an increasingly digital/virtual world with ubiquitous computing is a major theme of the novel. It examines the implications of rapid technological change that empowers both the disgruntled individuals who would threaten to disrupt society and those that would seek to stop them, and the implications for the age-old "who watches the watchers" issue at the interplay between surveillance (oversight) and sousveillance (undersight).

== Characters ==
- Robert Gu – former Professor Emeritus of English, Alzheimer's survivor and Fairmont High School pupil
- Lena Gu - Robert's wife
- Robert Gu, Jr. (Bob) – Robert Gu's son, Lieutenant Colonel and Officer of the Watch in the US Marines
- Alice Gong Gu – Bob Gu's wife, Colonel and Auditor in the US Marines
- Miri Gu – Bob and Alice Gu's 13-year-old daughter, Fairmont High School pupil and Robert Gu's co-conspirator
- Juan Orozco – Fairmont High School pupil (age 14) and Robert Gu's technical advisor
- Xiu Xiang - former Professor of Computer Science and Fairmont High School pupil
- Winston Blount - former Dean at UC San Diego, colleague/rival of Robert Gu and Fairmont High School pupil
- Zulfikar Sharif - Oregon State graduate student in literature who is writing a thesis on the works of Robert Gu.
- Alfred Vaz – head of India's External Intelligence Agency
- Günberk Braun – European Union Intelligence Board agent
- Keiko Mitsuri – Japanese Intelligence agent
- Mr. Rabbit/Mysterious Stranger – unidentified intellect, appearing as a rabbit to Vaz, Braun and Mitsuri, and as a voice only to Robert Gu

== Setting ==
Much of the novel's action occurs on the campus of the University of California, San Diego, especially in and around Geisel Library, the architectural centerpiece of the campus.

== Reception ==
- Hugo Award winner, 2007
- Locus Award winner, 2007
- John W. Campbell Memorial Award nominee, 2007

== See also ==
- Augmented reality
- Ubiquitous computing
