= A Deepness in the Sky =

1999 novel by Vernor Vinge

- Author: Vernor Vinge
- Cover artist: Bob Eggleton
- Language: English
- Series: Zones of Thought universe
- Genre: science fiction
- Published: 1999 (Tor Books)
- Publication place: United States
- Media type: Print (Hardback, Paperback)
- Pages: 606 (Hardback), 775 (Paperback)
- ISBN: 0-312-85683-0 (Hardback 1st edition), ISBN 0-8125-3635-5 (Paperback)
- OCLC: 40150541
- Dewey Decimal: 813/.54 21
- LC Class: PS3572.I534 D44 1999
- Preceded by: A Fire Upon the Deep
- Followed by: The Children of the Sky

A Deepness in the Sky is a science fiction novel by American writer Vernor Vinge. Published in 1999, the novel is a loose prequel (set 30,000 years previous) to his earlier novel A Fire Upon the Deep (1992).

== Plot summary ==
An intelligent alien species is discovered to exist on the planet Arachna orbiting an anomalous star, dubbed OnOff. The star is named this because for 215 of every 250 years it is dormant, releasing almost no detectable energy. During this period, Arachna freezes and its fauna go into hibernation. The planet's inhabitants, called "Spiders" by the humans for their resemblance to arachnids, have reached a stage of technological development very similar to that of Earth's humans in the early 20th century, although humans believe that they may once have been capable of space travel. If this is true, then whoever can establish ties with the aliens first could reap unimaginable rewards; humans have made contact with only one other intelligent (but non-technological) alien species in millennia of travel through the stars. Two human groups launch expeditions to the Spider world: the Qeng Ho (pronounced Chung Ho and named after the explorer Zheng He), traders who have developed a common interstellar culture for humanity; and the Emergents, a civilization that enslaves selected human minds and has only recently re-emerged from a Dark Age.

The Qeng Ho arrive at the OnOff star shortly before the Emergent fleet, a few years before the star turns on, at which point the Spider civilization will "wake up" and continue its climb into a technological civilization. A reception held by the Emergents doubles as a vector to infect the Qeng Ho with a timed "mindrot" virus. The Emergents time an ambush to take advantage of the onset of symptoms.

During these events, a concurrent history of the Spider civilization unfolds – mainly through the picaresque (and then increasingly political and technocratic) experiences of a small group of progressive-minded Spiders. Their struggles against ignorance and obsolescent traditions are colored with oddly human-like descriptions and nomenclature, prefiguring some major plot revelations towards the end of the story.

Far above, after a close fight, the Emergents subjugate the Qeng Ho. However, losses to both sides force them to combine and adopt the so-called "Lurker strategy," monitoring and aiding the Spiders' technological development while waiting until they build up the massive infrastructure and technological base that the visitors need in order to repair their vessels.

The mindrot virus originally manifested itself on the Emergents' home world as a devastating plague, but they subsequently mastered it and learned to use it both as a weapon and as a tool for mental domination. (Note: Compare the enslaving methods practised on mankurts in Chinghiz Aitmatov's 1980 novel The Day Lasts More Than a Hundred Years.) Emergent culture uses mindrot primarily in the form of a variant which technicians can manipulate in order to release neurotoxins to specific parts of the brain. An active MRI-type device triggers changes through dia- and paramagnetic biological molecules. By manipulating the brain in this way, Emergent managers induce obsession with a single idea or specialty, which they call Focus, essentially turning people into brilliant appliances. Many Qeng Ho become Focused against their will, and the Emergents retain the rest of the population under mass surveillance, with only a portion of the crew not in suspended animation. The Qeng Ho trading culture gradually starts to dilute this, by demonstrating to the Emergents certain benefits of tolerated and restricted free trade; the two human cultures merge to some extent over the decades of forced co-operation.

Pham Nuwen, a folk hero of the Qeng Ho trading culture, is living aboard the fleet under the pseudonym Pham Trinli, posing as an inept and bumbling fleet elder. He subverts the Emergents' own oppressive security systems through a series of high-risk ruses. During his plotting he begins to admire the Emergents' Focus technology, seeing it as the missing link in his lifelong goal to form a true interstellar empire and to break the cycle of collapse and rebuild that plagues human planetary civilizations.

The plan to wrest fleet control from the Emergents, however, requires the co-operation of Ezr Vinh, a much younger Qeng Ho who, through attrition, has become the Qeng Ho "Fleet Manager". Ezr's position as the unique liaison officer between Qeng Ho and Emergents leads him to despair, and he accepts Pham Nuwen's offer to join a plot against the Emergents as a way to personal redemption as well as to take revenge against the Emergents. However, his understanding of Pham's ambitions for Focus technology leads to a confrontation between them over the future use of Focus by the Qeng Ho. With new knowledge of the effects and victims of Focus, Pham is forced to admit the cost is too high, and the two reach an agreement and continue their plotting.

The critical moment comes when the Emergents attempt to provoke a nuclear war on the Spider home-world in order to seize power. The conspirators subvert the Emergents' systems and put their plans in action, but so do a small group of Spiders who have become aware of the humans and have been working in secret for years to subvert their Focused as well. Together, the two sides successfully defeat the ruling class of the Emergents.

The combined Emergent/Qeng Ho fleet now negotiates with the Spider civilization as a trading partner. Pham announces his plans to free all of the Focused in the entire Emergent civilization, and, if he survives that, to go to the Galactic Center to find the source of the OnOff star and the strange technology remnants that have clearly traveled with it.

== Elements ==
=== Interstellar culture ===
The book discusses some of the problems of trying to maintain an interstellar trading culture without access to superluminal travel or to superluminal communication. Time-measurement details provide an interesting concept in the book: the Qeng Ho measure time primarily in terms of seconds, since the notion of days, months, and years has no usefulness between various star-systems. The timekeeping system uses terms such as kiloseconds and megaseconds. The Qeng Ho's computer and timekeeping systems feature the advent of "programmer archaeologists": the Qeng Ho are packrats of computer programs and systems, retaining them over millennia, even as far back to the era of Unix programs (as implied by one passage mentioning that the fundamental time-keeping system is the Unix epoch):

Take the Traders' method of timekeeping. The frame corrections were incredibly complex - and down at the very bottom of it was a little program that ran a counter. Second by second, the Qeng Ho counted from the instant that a human had first set foot on Old Earth's moon. But if you looked at it still more closely ... the starting instant was actually about fifteen million seconds later, the 0-second of one of Humankind's first computer operating systems.

This massive accumulation of data implies that almost any useful program one could want already exists in the Qeng Ho fleet library, hence the need for computer archaeologists to dig up needed programs, work around their peculiarities and bugs, and assemble them into useful constructs.

=== Time ===
The Qeng Ho and other spacers in this series use kiloseconds (roughly 17 minutes), megaseconds (roughly 11.6 days), and gigaseconds (roughly 32 years) as units of time.

=== Localizers ===
With this work, Vinge introduces "localizers" to his set of science-fiction concepts. Localizers are tiny devices which can contain a simple processor, sensors, and short-range communications. Vinge explores how intelligent control can use mesh networking of these devices in ways quite different from those of traditional computer networks.

=== Relation to A Fire Upon the Deep ===
Only one concrete connection links A Deepness in the Sky with A Fire Upon the Deep: the character of Pham Nuwen, the "Programmer-at-Arms", who appears in both books. Hints occur about the "Zones of Thought" mentioned in Fire. That novel posits that space around the Milky Way is divided into concentric layers called "Zones," each being constrained by different laws of physics and each allowing for different degrees of biological and technological advancement. The innermost, the "Unthinking Depths," surrounds the galactic core and is incapable of supporting advanced life forms at all. The next layer, the "Slow Zone," is roughly equivalent to the real world in behavior and potential. Further out, the zone named the "Beyond" can support futuristic technologies such as AI and FTL travel. The outermost zone, the "Transcend," contains most of the galactic halo and is populated by incomprehensibly vast and powerful posthuman entities.

A Deepness in the Sky takes place in the Slow Zone, though Vinge does not explain the connections, and the characters in the story remain unaware of the zones' existence. The sun's inexplicably strange behavior, the unusual planetary system (with only a solitary planet and several asteroid-sized diamonds), and the discovery of "cavorite" on the planet may indicate the system originated in the Transcend, though it is currently moving outward from the Unthinking Depths. Vinge's characters speculate that the Spiders descend from minor life forms living amongst an ancient star-faring civilization, and that the anti-gravity material and other strange artifacts have connections with that civilization. Unfortunately, they guess the structure of the Zones (though not the actual properties) backwards, coming to the conclusion that the bright center of the galaxy is the most likely location for advanced civilization. This leads Pham on his path inwards to the Unthinking Depths, and his eventual resurrection.

=== Relation to The Outcasts of Heaven Belt ===
Joan D. Vinge has indicated that her novel The Outcasts of Heaven Belt is also set in the Slow Zone of the Zones of Thought setting. Both novels show their spacefaring civilizations using seconds, kiloseconds, megaseconds, and gigaseconds as their primary units of time.

== Reception ==
Deepness won the 2000 Hugo Award for Best Novel, the 2000 John W. Campbell Memorial Award, the 2000 Prometheus Award and the 2004 Kurd-Laßwitz-Preis for Best Foreign Fiction; as well, it was nominated for the Nebula Award for Best Novel, the 2000 Arthur C. Clarke Award, and the 2000 Locus Award for Best Science Fiction Novel.

Nick Gevers called Deepness "one of the best constructed and most absorbing space operas of the decade," and commented that its "shrewd triumph" is that neither optimism nor pessimism defeats the other. John Clute lauded it as "the most extended example of dramatic irony ever published," in that not only do none of the characters ever learn the truth about the universe, neither does anyone who has not read Fire; he did, however, criticize "the odd dozen-page segments given over to hard-SF geekishness about orbits and computers and stuff."

The SF Site's Greg L. Johnson considered the novel to be "deceptively straight-forward," and at Strange Horizons, Amy Harlib praised it as "huge, complex and captivating" and "rich and satisfying and deserving of its award," emphasizing that it is the equal of its predecessor work. Kirkus Reviews described it as a "chilling, spellbinding dramatization of the horrors of slavery and mind control," while Publishers Weekly noted that it would "fully engage" readers' sense of wonder, and correctly predicted that it would be nominated for the Hugo Award.

== Release details ==
- 1999, United States of America, Tor Books, ISBN 0-312-85683-0, Pub date March 1999, Hardback
- 2000, United States of America, Tor Books, ISBN 0-8125-3635-5, Pub date January 2000, Paperback
