= The Peace War =

1984 novel by Vernor Vinge

- Cover of first edition (hardcover)
- Author: Vernor Vinge
- Language: English
- Series: Across Real Time
- Genre: Science fiction
- Publisher: Bluejay Books
- Publication date: August 1984
- Publication place: United States
- Media type: Print (hardback & paperback)
- Pages: 286
- ISBN: 0-312-94342-3
- OCLC: 10996240
- Dewey Decimal: 813/.54 19
- LC Class: PS3572.I534 P4 1984
- Followed by: "The Ungoverned"

The Peace War is a science fiction novel by American writer Vernor Vinge, about authoritarianism and technological progress. It was first published as a serial in Analog in 1984, and in book form shortly afterward. It was nominated for the Hugo Award for Best Novel in 1985. A sequel, Marooned in Realtime, was published in 1986. The two novels and "The Ungoverned", a related novella, are collected in Across Realtime (Baen Books, 1991).

== Plot ==
The story takes place in 2048, 51 years after scientists at Lawrence Livermore National Laboratory develop a force field-generating device they term the Bobbler. The Bobbler creates a perfectly spherical, reflective, impenetrable, and persistent shield around or through anything.

The bureaucracy running the Laboratory decide to use the Bobbler as a weapon. Declaring themselves the "Peace Authority", they enclose the world's weapons and military bases in bobbles, and occasionally entire cities or governments. A brief war is triggered but ends quickly as the military is cut off from command, their weapons, and each other. It is presumed that the people within the bobbles die due to a lack of air and sunlight, since it is believed that the universe is partitioned by a bobble into two sections (inside and outside the bobble). In this new world, governments are weak where they are permitted at all; the Peace Authority seizes control and becomes a worldwide government. In an effort to retain their monopoly on the Bobbler, the Peace Authority makes technological progress illegal and returns the planet to a level similar to that of the 19th century.

The story opens with the crew of a military spaceplane emerging from their bobble and being picked up by a group of Tinkers. The Tinkers are a rebel group who have continued to secretly develop technology to a point well beyond what the Authority allows. Their emergence reveals two previously unknown facts about bobbles: one is that they are not force fields, but rather stasis fields inside which no time elapses, and the second is that they do not last forever, but will eventually "pop" at a time that is not initially determinable by the operators of the Bobbler. The bobble around the spaceplane is one of the first one known to pop; it is eventually found that the first bobbles last roughly fifty years.

One of the original inventors of the bobble develops a more advanced version of the bobbler which can produce bobbles of any size, unlike the Authority's original which is at least house-sized and requires a huge amount of power to run. They also find that they can set the duration of a bobble. With the help of a young thief who is also a mathematical genius, they lead a rebellion to try to bobble the power generators of the Peace Authority and thus neutralize its primary weapon.
