= True Names =

Seminal cyberpunk novel by Vernor Vinge

- Author: Vernor Vinge
- Language: English
- Series: Binary Star #5, ed. James R. Frenkel
- Genre: Science fiction, cyberpunk
- Published: 1981 (Dell Publishing)
- Publication place: USA
- Media type: Novella
- ISBN: 978-0241975589

True Names is a 1981 science fiction novella by American writer Vernor Vinge, a seminal work of the cyberpunk genre. It is one of the earliest stories to present a fully fleshed-out concept of cyberspace, which would later be central to cyberpunk. The story also contains elements of transhumanism.

True Names first brought Vinge to prominence as a science fiction writer. It also inspired many real-life hackers and computer scientists; a 2001 book about the novella, True Names: And the Opening of the Cyberspace Frontier, included essays by Danny Hillis, Marvin Minsky, Mark Pesce, Richard Stallman and others. It was a finalist for the Hugo and Nebula awards in 1982, and was awarded the Prometheus Hall of Fame Award in 2007.

== Plot summary ==
The story follows the progress of a group of computer hackers (called "warlocks") who are early adopters of a new full-immersion virtual reality technology, called the "Other Plane". Warlocks penetrate computers around the world for personal profit or curiosity. They must keep their true identities ("True Names") secret even from each other and from the "Great Enemy", the United States government, as those who know a warlock's True Name can force him to work on their behalf, or cause a "True Death" by killing the warlock in real life.

The protagonist is a warlock known as "Mr. Slippery" in the Other Plane. The government learns Mr. Slippery's True Name—Roger Pollack, a holonovelist in Arcata, California—and forces him to investigate the Mailman, a mysterious new warlock which the government suspects of conducting a large-scale subversion of databases and networks. The Mailman has been recruiting others, such as the warlock DON.MAC, by promising great power in the real world, and claims to be responsible for a recent revolution in Venezuela. Because he communicates only through text, and reacts to events only after a significant delay, Mr. Slippery and fellow warlock Erythrina begin to suspect that the Mailman may be an extraterrestrial invader, subverting global databases to conquer the Earth while causing the True Deaths of the warlocks he recruits.

Mr. Slippery and Erythrina receive permission from the government to use the old ARPANET to access massive amounts of computational power around the world as they search for the Mailman. As they become the most powerful warlocks in history they realize that DON.MAC is a sophisticated "personality simulator" working for the Mailman. It violently defends itself, and both sides use network connections to military weaponry to attack in the real world. Erythrina is forced to reveal her True Name to Mr. Slippery as the battles, real and virtual, cause global chaos. They succeed in destroying the many copies of the Mailman's AI, and although tempted to keep their power over the world realize that they do not wish to be tyrants.

Ten weeks after the war and resulting worldwide economic depression from the disruptions in computer systems, Mr. Slippery returns to the Coven and learns that the Mailman may have survived. Fearing that Erythrina succumbed to temptation for power, Pollack visits her—Debbie Charteris of Providence, Rhode Island—in person. The elderly Charteris, an early military computer programmer, reveals that the Mailman was not an extraterrestrial, but a National Security Agency AI research project to protect government systems. Mistakenly left running, it slowly grew in power and sophistication, and used non-real-time communication to disguise its inability to fully emulate the human mind. As Charteris succumbs to senility she transfers more of her personality to the defeated Mailman's kernel, and tells Pollack that "when this body dies, I will still be, and you can still talk to me".

== Afterword ==
Minsky's afterword reviews ideas from his Society of Mind concept: the idea "that there is, inside the cranium, perhaps as many as a hundred different kinds of computers, each with a somewhat different basic architecture", which specialize in different tasks and communicate, though perhaps only crudely. Minsky considers our conscious minds to be higher-level executives, which don't really understand the inner workings of the subcomponents but rather select "simple names from menu-lists of symbols which appear, from time to time, upon our mental screen-displays." Tying this back to virtual reality, Minsky suggests that "we, ourselves, already exist as processes imprisoned in machines inside machines! Our mental worlds are already filled with wondrous, magical, symbol–signs, which add to every thing we 'see' its ‘meaning’ and ‘significance’."

== Reception ==
In 2001, The New York Times declared that Vinge's depiction of "a world rife with pseudonymous characters and other elements of online life that now seem almost ho-hum" had been "prophetic", while Kirkus Reviews called it "still compelling". Strange Horizons called it a "landmark".

In 2001, a collection of essays, True Names: And the Opening of the Cyberspace Frontier, was published, with contributions from Danny Hillis, Timothy C. May, Marvin Minsky, Chip Morningstar and F. Randall Farmer, Mark Pesce, and Richard Stallman.

== See also ==
- Simulated reality
- Neuromancer
- Snow Crash
