= Bookworm, Run! =

1966 science fiction short story by Vernor Vinge

- Short story by Vernor Vinge
- Genre: Science fiction

Publication
- Published in: Analog Science Fiction Science Fact
- Publication date: 1966

"Bookworm, Run!" is a science fiction short story by American writer Vernor Vinge. His second published work of fiction, it appeared in Analog Science Fiction Science Fact in 1966, and was reprinted in True Names... and Other Dangers in 1987, and in 2001's The Collected Stories of Vernor Vinge.

As with many of Vinge's later works, "Bookworm, Run!" deals with intelligence amplification: Norman Simmons, the bookworm of the title, is a surgically altered chimpanzee with human-equivalent intelligence.

== Plot summary ==
As part of an experiment, Norman's brain has been given a wireless link to an enormous database. By accident, he is given access to the United States Government's main database. Seeking knowledge for its own sake, Norman asks for all the data stored within; one of the first facts he consciously realizes from his direct-brain download is that, by accessing classified data, he has just committed a federal crime with severe penalties.

Norman uses his new knowledge of the layout of the facility he inhabits to escape, and then correlates several seemingly unrelated facts to (correctly) deduce not only that there must be Soviet spies living in town, but who they are; he makes his way to the agents, hoping that they will help him reach Canada and escape the US Army.

As Norman nears the limit of the wireless link's range, he and the agents are captured; the Soviets' memories are surgically read and erased. Within the agents' memories is the revelation that the Soviet Union has performed similar intelligence-amplification experiments, but on a dog instead of a chimpanzee, foreshadowing a new arms race.

== Reception ==
Algis Budrys said that despite being a "collection of mismatched plot cliches ... it's a memorable story", comparing its protagonist to that of "Flowers for Algernon". Publishers Weekly, assessing the 2001 reprint, declared the story to be "quite dated"; similarly, the 1988 Science Fiction & Fantasy Book Review Annual, assessing the 1987 reprint, stated that it was "an early story that reads like one".

== Sequel ==
Vinge said that the "important" sequel to Bookworm would have featured the first human with amplified intelligence; however, when he attempted to sell such a story to John W. Campbell, Campbell rejected it with the explanation "You can't write this story. Neither can anyone else."
