= Tatja Grimm's World =

1987 novel by Vernor Vinge

- First edition
- Author: Vernor Vinge
- Cover artist: Tom Kidd
- Language: English
- Genre: Science fiction novel
- Publisher: Baen Books
- Publication date: July 1987
- Publication place: United States
- Media type: Print (paperback)
- Pages: 277
- ISBN: 0-671-65336-9

Tatja Grimm's World is a 1987 science fiction novel by American author Vernor Vinge.

== Background ==
Eighteen years after the publication of Grimm's World, Jim Baen of Baen Books offered to reprint the novel. Vinge revised the original text of Grimm's World and added a new beginning. The plotline now begins with "The Barbarian Princess", a novelette originally published in 1986 in the magazine Analog Science Fiction and Fact.

== Plot ==
The book covers three episodes in the life of Tatja Grimm.

Tatja, who grew up with barbarian tribes in the interior of a continent, has made her way to the coasts where there are several technologically advanced island-based civilizations. She finds her way to the Tarulle barge, a ship which publishes a magazine, Fantasie, that is distributed as it circumnavigates the islands. As science develops on the world, Fantasie has evolved from a fantasy magazine to including speculative fiction stories. Tatja bears a resemblance to Hrala, a recurring character in the stories, a fact which she uses to fool a superstitious island society that has imprisoned a group of scientists for attempting to use a telescope, an activity they regard as blasphemous.

Five years later, Tatja has advanced to a management position on the barge, a surprising feat for a supposedly barbarian teenager. She enlists student astronomer Svir Hendrigs and his dorfox Ancho, a creature who emits telepathic signals that can deceive nearby humans, on a scheme to steal the last remaining archive of all issues of Fantasie, before it is destroyed by the mad regent of Crownesse. In fact, the entire scheme is a ploy by Tatja to assume the identity of the lost princess who was murdered by the regent. This eventually succeeds and Tatja becomes an impostor queen of a powerful realm. She remarks that everybody she has met is incredibly stupid in comparison to her, and begins to wonder whether humans actually evolved on her world or have arrived from space.

Another few years later, Tatja finds a rebellion in her distant provinces. After her battle plans do not succeed fully, she is seduced by Jolle, ostensibly a chemist-turned-general in one of the factions loyal to her, who takes over command. Jolle reveals that he is like Tatja, and there is another like them, Profirio, who is commandeering the rebellion. Profirio is apparently a slaver from space whose employer has seeded Tatja's world with backwater humans, and has intended them to build up society until the world reaches a stable reproducing population, which will then be a regular supply of slaves, and it is Jolle's mission to stop him. The two have destroyed each other's ability to communicate with their respective spaceships and must rely on the budding astronomical capabilities of the mountain province in which the rebellion is taking place. Though signs point to Jolle being the slaver and Profirio being the rescuer, Tatja fails to realize this until it is almost too late, resulting in much death and destruction (which Jolle is only too happy to encourage). Eventually Profirio outplays Jolle just as he has commandeered a powerful telescope and has located his ship, and Tatja kills him. Profirio invites Tatja to join him on his ship and she promises Svir that she will return with genetic advancements for him, and that they will secretly guide the humans on the world to develop into a member of the galactic civilization.
