= Stasis field =

Area of space time is stopped

A stasis field or stasis chamber, in science fiction, is a confined area of space in which time does not pass. It is a variation on the related science-fictional concept of the force field and also related to the concept of suspended animation. The term and concept first appeared in Robert A. Heinlein's 1942 novel Beyond This Horizon.

Scientific analysis suggests that such fields are highly improbable due to the principles of quantum mechanics and the uncertainty principle.

== Concept ==
The stasis field concept is a variation on the related science-fictional concept of the force field. It is characterized by the absence of time passing inside the field.

== Terminology ==
The term and concept first appeared in Robert A. Heinlein's 1942 novel Beyond This Horizon. Other terms for the same concept have also appeared, such as "bobble" in Vernor Vinge's 1984 novel The Peace War, or "zero-tau field" in Peter F. Hamilton's 1996 novel The Reality Dysfunction. Conversely, some works use the term "stasis field" to refer to fields that do not have the property of stopping the passage of time, for instance Christopher Anvil's 1962 short story "Gadget vs. Trend" and Joe Haldeman's 1974 novel The Forever War.

== Narrative function ==
One of the ways stasis fields are used in fiction is as a form of suspended animation. Military applications also appear.

== Analysis ==
Kevin Grazier and Stephen Cass, in the 2015 non-fiction book Hollyweird Science: From Quantum Quirks to the Multiverse, write that according to the modern understanding of the laws of the universe, a separate region of space where time stands still cannot exist due to the uncertainty principle.

== See also ==
- Suspended animation in fiction
