= Vernor Vinge =

American computer scientist and writer (1944–2024)

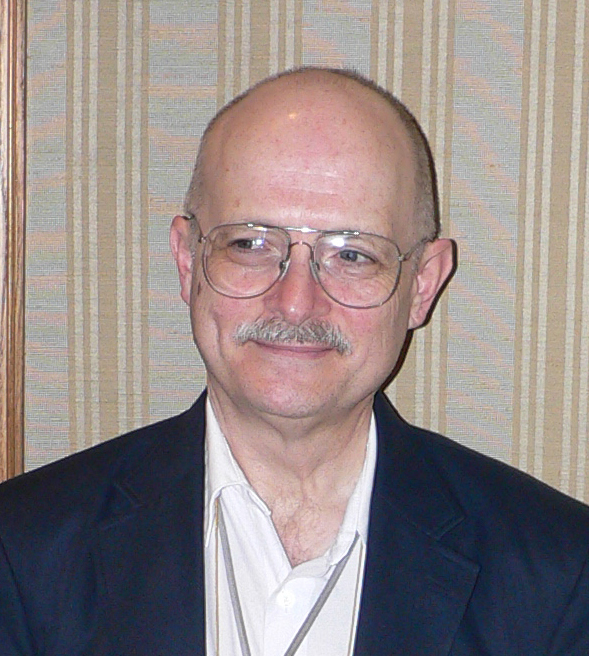
- Vinge in 2006
- Born: Vernor Steffen Vinge; October 2, 1944; Waukesha, Wisconsin, U.S.
- Died: March 20, 2024 (aged 79); La Jolla, California, U.S.
- Education: Michigan State University (B.S.); University of California, San Diego (M.A., Ph.D.)
- Occupation: Computer scientist
- Spouse: Joan D. Vinge (m. 1972; div. 1979)
- Writing career
- Period: 1966–2011
- Genre: Science fiction
- Notable works: True Names (1981); A Fire Upon the Deep (1992); The Coming Technological Singularity (1993); Fast Times at Fairmont High (2001)
- Notable awards: Hugo Awards: Best Novel: 1993, 2000, 2007; Best Novella: 2003, 2005; Prometheus Awards: 1987, 2000, 2004, 2007, 2014 Special Award for Lifetime Achievement

Vernor Steffen Vinge (/ˈvɜːrnər ˈvɪndʒiː/; October 2, 1944 – March 20, 2024) was an American science fiction author and professor. He taught mathematics and computer science at San Diego State University. He was the first wide-scale popularizer of the technological singularity concept and among the first authors to present a fictional "cyberspace". He won the Hugo Award for his novels A Fire Upon the Deep (1992), A Deepness in the Sky (1999), and Rainbows End (2006), and novellas Fast Times at Fairmont High (2001) and The Cookie Monster (2004).

== Writing career ==
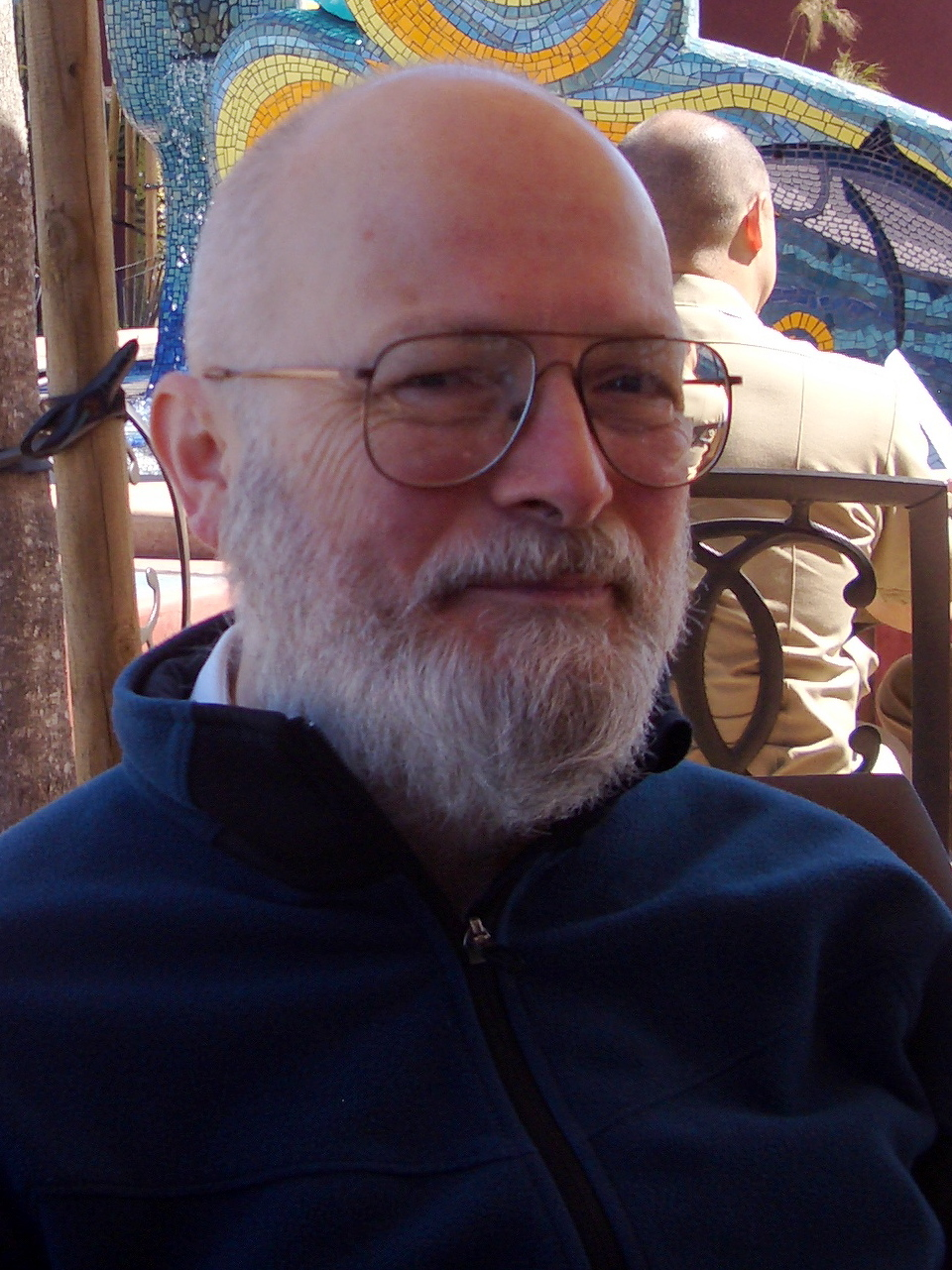
Vernor Vinge in San Diego, 2008

Vinge published his first short story, "Apartness", in the June 1965 issue of the British magazine New Worlds. His second, "Bookworm, Run!", was in the March 1966 issue of Analog Science Fiction, then edited by John W. Campbell. The story explores the theme of artificially augmented intelligence by connecting the brain directly to computerized data sources. Upon receiving his B.S. in mathematics from Michigan State University (where his father was a member of the geography faculty) in 1966, he became a moderately prolific contributor to SF magazines throughout the late 1960s and early 1970s. In 1969, he expanded the story "Grimm's Story" (Orbit 4, 1968) into his first novel, Grimm's World. During this period, Vinge also received his M.A. (1968) and Ph.D. (1971) in mathematics from the University of California, San Diego, the latter under the supervision of Stefan E. Warschawski. His second novel, The Witling, was published in 1976.

Vinge came to prominence in 1981 with his novella True Names, perhaps the first story to present a fully fleshed-out concept of cyberspace, which would later be central to cyberpunk stories by William Gibson, Neal Stephenson and others. His next two novels, The Peace War (1984) and Marooned in Realtime (1986), explore the spread of a future libertarian society, and deal with the impact of a technology which can create impenetrable force fields called 'bobbles'. These books built Vinge's reputation as an author who would explore ideas to their logical conclusions in particularly inventive ways. Both books were nominated for the Hugo Award, but lost to novels by William Gibson and Orson Scott Card.

Vinge won the Hugo Award (tying for Best Novel with Doomsday Book by Connie Willis) with his 1992 novel, A Fire Upon the Deep. A Deepness in the Sky (1999) was a prequel to Fire, following competing groups of humans in The Slow Zone as they struggle over who has the rights to exploit a technologically emerging alien culture. Deepness won the Hugo Award for Best Novel in 2000.

His novellas Fast Times at Fairmont High and The Cookie Monster also won Hugo Awards in 2002 and 2004, respectively.

Vinge's 2006 novel Rainbows End, set in the same universe and featuring some of the same characters as Fast Times at Fairmont High, won the 2007 Hugo Award for Best Novel. In 2011, he released The Children of the Sky, a sequel to A Fire Upon the Deep set approximately 10 years following the end of A Fire Upon the Deep.

Vinge retired in 2000 from teaching at San Diego State University, in order to write full-time. He was Writer Guest of Honor at ConJosé, the 60th World Science Fiction Convention in 2002. Vinge was awarded the Robert A. Heinlein Award in 2020. Vinge served on the Free Software Foundation's selection committee for their Award for the Advancement of Free Software for most of the years between 1999 and his death in 2024.

== Personal life ==
Vinge's former wife, Joan D. Vinge, is also a science fiction author. They were married from 1972 to 1979. Vernor Vinge died in La Jolla, California on March 20, 2024, at the age of 79. He had Parkinson's disease.

== Awards ==
Year	Title	Award	Category	Result	Ref
1985	The Peace War	Hugo Award	Novel	Finalist	
1987	Marooned in Realtime	Hugo Award	Novel	Finalist	
1987	Marooned in Realtime	Prometheus Award	—	Won	
1992	A Fire Upon the Deep	Nebula Award	Novel	Finalist	
1993	A Fire Upon the Deep	Hugo Award	Novel	Won	
1993	A Fire Upon the Deep	John W. Campbell Memorial Award	—	Finalist	
1993	A Fire Upon the Deep	Locus Award	Science Fiction Novel	Nominated	
2000	A Deepness in the Sky	Nebula Award	Novel	Finalist	
2000	A Deepness in the Sky	Hugo Award	Novel	Won	
2000	A Deepness in the Sky	John W. Campbell Memorial Award	—	Won	
2000	A Deepness in the Sky	Prometheus Award	—	Won	
2000	A Deepness in the Sky	Locus Award	Science Fiction Novel	Nominated	
2000	A Deepness in the Sky	Arthur C. Clarke Award	—	Nominated	
2007	Rainbows End	Hugo Award	Novel	Won	
2007	Rainbows End	Locus Award	Science Fiction Novel	Won	
2007	Rainbows End	John W. Campbell Memorial Award	—	Nominated	

== Bibliography ==
=== Novels ===
==== Realtime/Bobble series ====
- The Peace War (1984) ISBN 0-312-94342-3
- Marooned in Realtime (1986) ISBN 0-312-94295-8. Prometheus Award winner, 1987.

==== Zones of Thought series ====
- The Blabber (short story, 1988)
- A Fire Upon the Deep (1992)—Hugo winner, 1993 (shared with Doomsday Book); Nebula Award nominee, 1992; Locus SF Award nominee, 1993
- A Deepness in the Sky (1999)—Hugo, Campbell, and Prometheus Awards winner, 2000; Nebula Award nominee, 1999; Clarke and Locus SF Awards nominee, 2000
- The Children of the Sky (2011)

==== Standalone novels ====
- Grimm's World (1969), expanded as Tatja Grimm's World (1987)
- The Witling (1976)
- Rainbows End (2006) ISBN 0-312-85684-9—Hugo and Locus SF Awards winner, 2007; Campbell Award nominee, 2007

=== Collections ===
- Across Realtime (1986) ISBN 0-671-72098-8
  - The Peace War
  - "The Ungoverned" (added in 1991 edition)
  - Marooned in Realtime
- True Names ... and Other Dangers (1987) ISBN 0-671-65363-6
  - "Bookworm, Run!"
  - "True Names" (1981, winner 2007 Prometheus Hall of Fame Award)
  - "The Peddler's Apprentice" (with Joan D. Vinge)
  - "The Ungoverned" (occurs in the same milieu as The Peace War and Marooned in Realtime)
  - "Long Shot"
- Threats... and Other Promises (1988) ISBN 0-671-69790-0 (These two volumes collect Vinge's short fiction through the late 1980s.)
  - "Apartness"
  - "Conquest by Default" (occurs in the same milieu as "Apartness")
  - "The Whirligig of Time"
  - "Gemstone"
  - "Just Peace" (with William Rupp)
  - "Original Sin"
  - "The Blabber" (occurs in the same milieu as A Fire Upon the Deep)
- True Names and the Opening of the Cyberspace Frontier (2001) ISBN 0-312-86207-5 (contains "True Names" plus essays by others)
- The Collected Stories of Vernor Vinge (2001) ISBN 0-312-87373-5 (hardcover) or ISBN 0-312-87584-3 (paperback) (This volume collects Vinge's short fiction through 2001 (except "True Names"), including Vinge's comments from the earlier two volumes.)
  - "Bookworm, Run!"
  - "The Accomplice"
  - "The Peddler's Apprentice" (with Joan D. Vinge)
  - "The Ungoverned"
  - "Long Shot"
  - "Apartness"
  - "Conquest by Default"
  - "The Whirligig of Time"
  - "Bomb Scare"
  - "The Science Fair"
  - "Gemstone"
  - "Just Peace" (with William Rupp)
  - "Original Sin"
  - "The Blabber"
  - "Win a Nobel Prize!" (originally published in Nature, Vol. 407 No. 6805 "Futures")
  - "The Barbarian Princess" (this is also the first section of "Tatja Grimm's World")
  - "Fast Times at Fairmont High" (occurs in the same milieu as Rainbows End; winner 2002 Hugo Award for Best Novella)

=== Essays ===
- "The Coming Technological Singularity: How to Survive in the Post-Human Era" (1993), Whole Earth Review
- "2020 Computing: The creativity machine" (2006), Nature
- "The Disaster Stack" (2017) Chasing Shadows

=== Uncollected short fiction ===
- "A Dry Martini" (The 60th World Science Fiction Convention ConJosé Restaurant Guide, page 60)
- "The Cookie Monster" (Analog Science Fiction, October 2003) (winner 2004 Hugo Award for Best Novella)
- "Synthetic Serendipity", IEEE Spectrum Online, June 30, 2004
- "A Preliminary Assessment of the Drake Equation, Being an Excerpt from the Memoirs of Star Captain Y.-T. Lee" (2010) (Gateways: Original New Stories Inspired by Frederik Pohl, 2010)
- "BFF's first adventure", (originally published in Nature, Vol 518 No 7540 "Futures")
- "Legale", (originally published in Nature, Vol 548 No 7666 "Futures")
