= The Children of the Sky =

2011 novel by Vernor Vinge

- First edition
- Author: Vernor Vinge
- Cover artist: Stephan Martiniere
- Language: English
- Series: Zones of Thought series
- Genre: Hard science fiction
- Publisher: Tor Books
- Publication date: October 2011
- Publication place: United States
- Media type: Print (hardcover and paperback)
- Pages: 448
- ISBN: 0-312-87562-2
- OCLC: 24671893
- Dewey Decimal: 813/.54 20
- LC Class: PS3572.I534 F57 1992
- Preceded by: A Deepness in the Sky

The Children of the Sky is a science fiction novel by American writer Vernor Vinge. It is a sequel to A Fire Upon the Deep and shares the Zones of Thought universe with the prequel A Deepness in the Sky. It was published 20 years after the first novel but is set 10 years after its events.

Unlike A Fire Upon the Deep, the novel is set completely on the world of the Tines – pack animals which form collective intelligences. The protagonists include human characters from the first novel and their political struggles over the development of their new society and the threat from the remnants of the Blight.

It was nominated for the 2012 Locus Award for Best Science Fiction Novel and the Prometheus Award.

== Plot ==
Two years pass after the Battle on Starship Hill on Tines World. The exiled Tine pack Vendacious travels to the city of East Home, seeking to ally with Tycoon, the world's richest businessman. Over the next year, Vendacious helps Tycoon expand his enterprise (using a stolen human dataset) and undertake an expedition to the Tropical Choir, a legendary mob of over one hundred million Tines living in the world's equatorial region. Meanwhile, Ravna Bergsndot has slowly begun reviving the human Children who have been kept in cold sleep pods since their flight from High Lab and the Blight at the galaxy's edge. Although the Blight was effectively destroyed by Countermeasure, its fleet survives stranded 30 light-years away from Tines World, presumably developing ramscoop technology to resume its journey. Ravna hopes to use the technical archives on the crippled Out of Band II (Oobii) to elevate Woodcarver's Domain and Tines World to a level of technology advanced enough to combat the Blight's remnant. The Blight may yet take decades or even centuries to arrive, but when the Zone boundaries briefly shift, those estimates become questionable.

Ten years after the Battle on Starship Hill, Ravna's plans begin to crumble. She learns of a faction of Children calling themselves the Disaster Study Group who believe that the Blight's fleet is a rescue party sent for them, and that Countermeasure, having destroyed countless civilizations by moving the Slow Zone to quell the Blight, is the true evil. When Ravna tries to explain to an assembly of Children the importance of adhering to her schedule for advancing Tines World, she is upstaged and betrayed by Nevil Storherte, who convinces most of the Children that Ravna is obsessed and misguided, and that he should be the one to lead them. Nevil then forces Ravna to turn over sysadmin authority of Oobii to him, granting him access to its archives, systems, and weapons; however, Ravna secretly retains Command Privilege over the starship, a status that supersedes sysadmin.

Support for Nevil's leadership begins to falter as the medical advances he promised fail to bear fruit. Ravna conspires with Johanna Olsndot and the pack Pilgrim to force Nevil to compromise. Before that can happen, three of the youngest Children are kidnapped, ostensibly by Tines from the Tropics. Nevil uses the opportunity to leverage more power. Later, while Johanna and Pilgrim travel to investigate the Tropics, Ravna is kidnapped herself, and Johanna and Pilgrim crash into Tycoon's Reservation in the Tropics. It is revealed that Nevil was behind all three incidents and for several years has been allied with Tycoon and Vendacious to undermine Ravna and Woodcarver. In the Tropics, Pilgrim is lost to the Choir and Johanna escapes aboard a Tropical trade convoy bound for Woodcarver's Domain. Ravna, with the help of Jefri Olsndot, his friend pack Amdiranifani, and the pack Screwfloss (a rehabilitated Lord Steel), escapes her captors and attempts to return to Woodcarver's Domain to stop Nevil's tyranny. On the way, however, the four are re-captured and taken to the Tropics aboard two of Tycoon's airships. Back on Oobii, now under Nevil's control, Nevil's second-in-command Bili Yngva witnesses a massive Zone shift recorded by the ship's sensors. For a few minutes, Tines World is part of the Beyond and the "rescue party" fleet is estimated to close to within 20 light-years.

Ravna and company arrive at Tycoon's Reservation, where they learn that Tycoon, under Vendacious' influence, is on the verge of forcing Woodcarver to accede to an alliance, thereby removing Woodcarver's Domain as a threat to Tycoon's rapidly growing business empire. Later, when the meeting that Nevil had coordinated to force the "alliance" on Woodcarver and solidify his control over the Children occurs, it ends disastrously for him. Ravna regains control of Oobii with her Command Privilege, Vendacious is killed by a mutiny of his airship's crew, and Tycoon flees to the Tropics with Johanna (whom Tycoon believes to have killed his brother-pack, Scriber Jaqueramaphan) as an apparent hostage. Nevil and his fellow Disaster Study Group members (nearly half of all the Children) depart and establish their own settlement, "Best Hope", in a distant valley. Sometime later, Nevil announces that he remains allied with Tycoon, and Tycoon will soon return several hostages taken over the years: the two survivors among the Children kidnapped earlier, and the packs Amdiranifani and Screwfloss. Ravna and Jefri are disappointed when Johanna is not returned as well, but Johanna secretly reveals to Ravna that she has since become Tycoon's advisor and that their support of Nevil is a temporary ruse. In reality, Tycoon is forging a business partnership with Woodcarver and Ravna, who can provide technical expertise from Oobii.

The story concludes as Johanna, in the Tropics with Tycoon, speculates that with Tycoon's industrial power and the condensed information of countless civilizations in Oobii's archives, decades' worth of technological progress could be made in a couple of years. In Woodcarver's Domain, Ravna prays that Tines World will be ready for the Blight, which to her knowledge is still 30 light-years away.
