= Gregory Benford bibliography =

A bibliography of works by American science fiction author Gregory Benford.

== Novels ==
=== The Adventures of Viktor & Julia ===
Name	Published	ISBN	Notes
The Martian Race	Warner Aspect, 12/1999	ISBN 978-0-446-52633-3	
The Sunborn	Warner Aspect, 3/2005	ISBN 978-0-446-53058-3	

=== Galactic Center Saga ===
Name	Published	ISBN	Notes
In the Ocean of Night	Dial Press, 1976		Nebula Award nominee, 1977; Locus Award nominee, 1978
Across the Sea of Suns	Simon & Schuster, 1/1984	ISBN 978-0-671-44668-0	
Great Sky River	Bantam Books, 12/1987	ISBN 978-0-553-05238-1	reviewed by the LA Times; Nebula Award nominee, 1988
Tides of Light	Bantam Books, 1/1989	ISBN 978-0-553-05322-7	reviewed by the LA Times; Locus Award nominee, 1990
Furious Gulf	Bantam Spectra, 7/1994	ISBN 978-0-553-09661-3	reviewed by the LA Times
Sailing Bright Eternity	Bantam Spectra, 8/1995	ISBN 978-0-553-08655-3	

=== Jupiter Projects ===
Name	Published	ISBN	Notes
Jupiter Project	Thomas Nelson, 1975	ISBN 978-0-8407-6456-0	
Against Infinity	Ultramarine Press, March 1983	ISBN 978-0-671-46491-2	Nebula Award nominee, 1983

=== Other series contributions ===
Man-Kzin Wars (with Larry Niven)

Name	Published	ISBN	Notes
Man-Kzin Wars VI	Baen Books, 1994	ISBN 978-0-671-87607-4	
A Darker Geometry: A Man-Kzin Novel	Baen Books, 8/1996	ISBN 978-0-671-87740-8	co-authored with Mark O. Martin

=== Second Foundation ===
Name	Published	ISBN	Notes
Foundation's Fear	Harper Prism, 1997	ISBN 978-0-06-105243-9	

=== Non-series novels ===
Name	Published	ISBN	Notes
Deeper Than the Darkness (a.k.a. The Stars in Shroud)	Ace Books, 1970		
Timescape	Simon & Schuster, 1980	ISBN 978-0-671-25327-1	Nebula winner, 1980; British SF Award winner, 1980; Campbell Award winner, 1981; Locus Award nominee, 1981
Artifact	St. Martin's Press, 6/1985	ISBN 978-0-312-93048-6	
Iceborn	Tor Double Novels, 11/1989	ISBN 0-8125-0277-9	with Paul A. Carter
Beyond the Fall of Night	Putnam Publishing, 7/1990	ISBN 978-0-399-13499-9	Combined edition of Benford's novella "Beyond the Fall of Night" with Arthur C. Clarke's "Against the Fall of Night"
Cosm	Warner Aspect, 2/1998	ISBN 978-0-380-97435-1	
Eater	Eos, 5/2000	ISBN 978-0-380-97436-8	Locus Award nominee, 2001
Beyond Infinity	Warner Aspect, March 2004	ISBN 978-0-446-53059-0	Expanded from the novella "Beyond the Fall of Night"
The Berlin Project	Simon & Schuster, 2017	ISBN 978-1-4814-8764-1	
Rewrite: Loops in the Timescape	Simon & Schuster, 2019	ISBN 978-1-4814-8769-6	A "thematic sequel" to Benford's 1980 novel Timescape.
Shadows of Eternity	Simon & Schuster, 2021	ISBN 978-1534443624	

=== Collaborations ===
Name	Published	ISBN	Notes
If the Stars Are Gods	Berkley Books, 1977	ISBN 978-0-399-11942-2	with Gordon Eklund
Shiva Descending	St. Martin's Press, 1980		with William Rotsler
Find the Changeling	Dell Publishing, 1980	ISBN 978-0-440-12604-1	with Gordon Eklund
Heart of the Comet	Bantam Spectra, 2/1986	ISBN 978-0-553-05125-4	with David Brin; Locus Award nominee, 1987
Beyond the Fall of Night	Putnam Publishing, 7/1990	ISBN 978-0-399-13499-9	with Arthur C. Clarke
Bowl of Heaven	Tom Doherty Associates, Tor Books 10/2012	ISBN 9780765328410	with Larry Niven
Shipstar	Tom Doherty Associates, Tor Books 04/2014	ISBN 9780765328700	with Larry Niven
Glorious	Tom Doherty Associates, Tor Books 06/2020	ISBN 9780765392404	with Larry Niven

== Short fiction ==
=== Collections ===
- In Alien Flesh (March 1986)
- Matter's End (January 1995)
- Worlds Vast and Various (October 2000)
- Immersion and Other Short Novels (March 2002)
- Anomalies (March 2012)
- The Best of Gregory Benford (July 2015)

=== Standalone anthologies ===
- Hitler Victorious: Eleven Stories of the German Victory in World War II (October 1986, with Martin H. Greenberg)
- Nuclear War (July 1988, with Martin H. Greenberg)
- Far Futures (December 1995)
- The New Hugo Winners Volume IV (November 1997, with Martin H. Greenberg)
- Nebula Awards Showcase 2000 (April 2000)
- Skylife: Space Habitats in Story and Science (April 2000, with George Zebrowski)
- Microcosms (January 2004)
- Merlin (July 2004, with Martin H. Greenberg)
- Sentinels: In Honor of Arthur C. Clarke (August 2010, with George Zebrowski)
- Starship Century: Toward the Grandest Horizon (August 2013, with James Benford)

=== "What Might Have Been" anthologies ===
- Alternate Empires (August 1989, with Martin H. Greenberg)
- Alternate Heroes (January 1990, with Martin H. Greenberg)
- Alternate Wars (December 1991, with Martin H. Greenberg)
- Alternate Americas (October 1992, with Martin H. Greenberg)

=== Short stories ===
- "Stand-In" The Magazine of Fantasy and Science Fiction (June 1965), collected in Matter's End
- "Representative From Earth" The Magazine of Fantasy and Science Fiction (January 1966)
- "Flattop" The Magazine of Fantasy and Science Fiction (May 1966)
- "Deeper Than the Darkness" The Magazine of Fantasy and Science Fiction (April 1969), nominated for the Hugo and Nebula awards in 1970, expanded into the novel of the same name
- "Sons of Man" Amazing Stories (November 1969)
- "Nobody Lives on Burton Street" Amazing Science Fiction (May 1970), selected for Terry Carr's World's Best Science Fiction: 1971, reprinted in Amazing Stories May 1981, collected in Matter's End and The Best of Gregory Benford
- "The Scarred Man" Venture Science Fiction Magazine (May 1970), collected in Worlds Vast and Various
- "The Prince of New York" (with Laurence Littenberg) Fantastic (June 1970)
- "Treaty" (with David Book) Fantastic (August 1970)
- "3:02 p.m., Oxford" If (September/October 1970)
- "The Movement" Fantastic (October 1970)
- "Inalienable Rite" Quark/1 (November 1970)
- "But the Secret Sits" Galaxy Science Fiction (March 1971)
- "Star Crossing" (with Donald Franson) If (March/April 1971)
- "Battleground" (with Jim Benford) If (May/June 1971)
- "West Wind, Falling" (with Gordon Eklund Universe 1 (1971)
- "And the Sea Like Mirrors" Again, Dangerous Visions (1972)
- "In the Ocean of Night" Worlds of If (May/Jun 1972), later incorporated into the novel of the same name
- "Icarus Descending" The Magazine of Fantasy and Science Fiction (April 1973), later incorporated into In the Ocean of Night
- "Man in a Vice" Amazing Science Fiction (February 1974)
- "Nobody Lives Around There" Vertex: The Magazine of Science Fiction (February 1974)
- "If the Stars Are Gods" (with Gordon Eklund) Universe 4 (March 1974), selected for Terry Carr's The Best Science Fiction of the Year 4 (July 1975), winner of the Nebula Award in 1975, later incorporated into If the Stars Are Gods
- "Threads of Time" Threads of Time (August 1974), later incorporated into In the Ocean of Night
- "Doing Lennon" Analog Science Fiction/Science Fact (April 1975), selected for Terry Carr's The Best Science Fiction of the Year 5, nominated for the Hugo, Nebula and Locus awards in 1976, collected in In Alien Flesh, Anomalies and The Best of Gregory Benford
- "White Creatures" New Dimensions 5 (April 1975), nominated for the Nebula Award in 1976, collected in In Alien Flesh and The Best of Gregory Benford
- "John of the Apocalypse" (with James Benford) Tomorrow Today (1975)
- "Beyond Grayworld" Analog Science Fiction/Science Fact (September 1975)
- "Cambridge, 1:58 A.M" Epoch (November 1975)
- "How It All Went" Amazing Stories (March 1976), reprinted in 100 Great Science Fiction Short Short Stories (1978)
- "The Anvil of Jove" (with Gordon Eklund) The Magazine of Fantasy and Science Fiction (July 1976), later incorporated into If the Stars Are Gods
- "Seascape" (aka Pebble Among the Stars) Faster Than Light (1976), reprinted in The Crash of Empire
- "What Did You Do Last Year?" (with Gordon Eklund) Universe 6 (1976)
- "Marauder!" Alien Worlds (November 1976)
- "Hellas Is Florida" (with Gordon Eklund) The Magazine of Fantasy and Science Fiction (January 1977), later incorporated into If the Stars Are Gods
- "Knowing Her" New Dimensions 7 (April 1977), collected in Matter's End
- "Homemaker" Cosmos Science Fiction and Fantasy Magazine (May 1977)
- "A Snark in the Night" The Magazine of Fantasy and Science Fiction (August 1977), nominated for the Hugo Award for Best Novella in 1978, later incorporated into In the Ocean of Night
- "Nooncoming" Universe 8 (May 1978), collected in In Alien Flesh
- "Starswarmer" Analog Science Fiction/Science Fact (June 1978, first printing truncated due to an error, printed in full in the September issue), later incorporated into Tides of Light
- "In Alien Flesh" The Magazine of Fantasy and Science Fiction (September 1978), selected for The 1979 Annual World's Best SF and Best SF Stories of the Year: Eighth Annual Collection, reprinted in In Alien Flesh and The Best of Gregory Benford
- "Old Woman By the Road" Destinies (November/December 1978), selected for Thor's Hammer and The Best of Destinies (1980)
- "A Hiss of Dragon" (with Marc Laidlaw) Omni, (December 1978), selected for The Best Science Fiction of the Year 8 and The Third Omni Book of Science Fiction
- "Time Guide" Destinies (January/February 1979), collected in Matter's End
- "Calibrations and Exercises" New Dimensions 9 (April 1979), selected for The Best of New Dimensions, collected in Matter's End
- "Redeemer" Analog Science Fiction/Science Fact (April 1979), selected for Best Science Fiction Stories of the Year: Ninth Annual Collection, reprinted in The Endless Frontier, Vol. II, collected in In Alien Flesh and The Best of Gregory Benford
- "Dark Sanctuary" Omni (May 1979), reprinted in The Endless Frontier and Lightspeed (February 2012), collected in Matter's End and The Best of Gregory Benford
- "Time Shards" Universe 9 (May 1979), selected for The Best Science Fiction of the Year 9, reprinted in In Alien Flesh and The Best of Gregory Benford
- "Titan Falling" Amazing Stories (August 1980)
- "Pick an Orifice" Destinies (November 1980)
- "Shall We Take a Little Walk?" Destinies (April 1981), reprinted in Worldmakers: SF Adventures in Terraforming
- "Cadenza" New Dimensions 12 (June 1981), collected in Matter's End
- "Exposures" Isaac Asimov's Science Fiction Magazine (July 1981), reprinted in The Road to Science Fiction #4: From Here to Forever, The Norton Book of Science Fiction: North American Science Fiction, 1960–1990 and The Ascent of Wonder: The Evolution of Hard SF, reprinted in In Alien Flesh and The Best of Gregory Benford
- "Slices" Destinies (August 1981), collected in Matter's End
- "Swarmer, Skimmer" Science Fiction Digest (October 1981), nominated for the Nebula Award in 1982, selected for The Best Science Fiction of the Year 11
- "SF: Why We Read It" (poem) Amazing Stories (November 1981)
- "The Other Side of the River" Rigel Science Fiction (April 1982)
- "Valhalla" The Magazine of Fantasy and Science Fiction (April 1982), reprinted in Hitler Victorious: Eleven Stories of the German Victory in World War II
- "Lazarus Rising" Isaac Asimov's Science Fiction Magazine (July 1982), collected in Anomalies
- "Relativistic Effects" Perpetual Light (October 1982), selected for The Best Science Fiction of the Year 12, reprinted in The Ascent of Wonder: The Evolution of Hard SF, collected in In Alien Flesh and The Best of Gregory Benford
- "Sandy Lust" (poem) The Berkley Showcase Volume 5 (October 1982)
- "The Touch" (based on "Continuidad de los parques", from Final del juego by Julio Cortázar) The Best of Omni Science Fiction No. 5 (1983)
- "Me/Days" Universe 14 (June 1984), selected for The Science Fiction Yearbook, collected in In Alien Flesh
- "Time's Rub" Time's Rub (November 1984), reprinted in Isaac Asimov's Science Fiction Magazine (April 1985), Mathenauts: Tales of Mathematical Wonder and Future on Ice, collected in In Alien Flesh and The Best of Gregory Benford
- "To the Storming Gulf" The Magazine of Fantasy and Science Fiction (April 1985), reprinted in Afterwar, Armageddon!, The Best Military Science Fiction of the 20th Century and The End of the World: Stories of the Apocalypse, collected in In Alien Flesh and Immersion and Other Short Novels
- "Immortal Night" Omni (April 1985), collected in Matter's End
- "Of Space/Time and the River" Of Space/Time and the River (1985), reprinted in Isaac Asimov's Science Fiction Magazine (February 1986) and Future Earths: Under African Skies, selected for Terry Carr's Best Science Fiction of the Year 15, collected in In Alien Flesh, Immersion and Other Short Novels and The Best of Gregory Benford
- "Newton Sleep" The Magazine of Fantasy and Science Fiction (January 1986), reprinted in Heroes in Hell, nominated for the Nebula Award in 1987
- "Snatching the Bot" In Alien Flesh (March 1986) (first English publication)
- "Blood on Glass" (poem) In Alien Flesh (March 1986), reprinted in Isaac Asimov's Science Fiction Magazine (mid-December 1986)
- "Dancing with the Straw Man" Far Frontiers, Volume V (May 1986)
- "Freezeframe" Interzone (Autumn 1986), reprinted in Amazing Stories (May 1987), collected in Matter's End and The Best of Gregory Benford
- "As Big as the Ritz" Interzone (Winter 1986), reprinted in Alien Stars III: Under The Wheel, collected in Worlds Vast and Various
- "At the Double Solstice" At the Double Solstice (December 1986), reprinted in Terry's Universe, collected in The Galactic Center Companion, 2nd Edition
- "The Gods of the Gaps" Crusaders in Hell (May 1987)
- "Bleak Velocities" (poem) Synergy: New Science Fiction, Number 1 (1987)
- "What Are You Going to Be When You Grow Up?" Spaceships & Spells (November 1987)
- "Mandikini" The Universe (November 1987), collected in The Galactic Center Companion, 2nd Edition
- "Proselytes" Full Spectrum (September 1988), collected in Matter's End and The Best of Gregory Benford
- "We Could Do Worse" We Could Do Worse (October 1988), reprinted in Isaac Asimov's Science Fiction Magazine (April 1989), What Might Have Been? Vol I: Alternate Empires and Roads Not Taken: Tales of Alternate History, collected in Matter's End
- "All the Beer on Mars" Isaac Asimov's Science Fiction Magazine (January 1989)
- "Alphas" Amazing Stories (March 1989), selected for The Year's Best Science Fiction: Seventh Annual Collection and The 1990 Annual World's Best SF
- "Proserpina's Daughter" (with Paul A. Carter) Synergy: New Science Fiction, Vol. 3 (1989), later expanded as Iceborn
- "Waiting for the Next Wave" (poem) Amazing Stories (July 1989)
- "Mozart on Morphine" The Magazine of Fantasy and Science Fiction (October 1989), reprinted in The Microverse, collected in Matter's End and The Best of Gregory Benford
- "Leviathan" Omni (November 1989), collected in Matter's End
- "The Rose and the Scalpel" Time Gate (December 1989), reprinted in Amazing Stories (January 1990)
- "Warstory" Isaac Asimov's Science Fiction Magazine (January 1990)
- "Latter-Day Martian Chronicles" Omni (July 1990)
- "The Eagle and the Cross" Dangerous Interfaces (October 1990)
- "Centigrade 233" Centigrade 233 (December 1990), reprinted in Isaac Asimov's Science Fiction Magazine (December 1991) and The Bradbury Chronicles: Stories in Honor of Ray Bradbury, collected in Matter's End and The Best of Gregory Benford
- "Matter's End" Full Spectrum 3 (June 1991), nominated for the Nebula Award in 1993, selected for The Year's Best Science Fiction: Ninth Annual Collection, reprinted in The Hard SF Renaissance, collected in Matter's End, Immersion and Other Short Novels and The Best of Gregory Benford
- "Dread Moon" The Jupiter War (August 1991)
- "Manassas, Again" Isaac Asimov's Science Fiction Magazine (October 1991), reprinted in What Might Have Been? Volume 3: Alternate Wars, The Best Alternate History Stories of the 20th Century and The Mammoth Book of Alternate Histories
- "Touches" Amazing Stories (December 1991), collected in Matter's End
- "Down the River Road" After the King: Stories in Honor of J. R. R. Tolkien (January 1992)
- "Rumbling Earth" Aboriginal Science Fiction (March 1992)
- "World Vast, World Various" Murasaki (May 1992), collected in Worlds Vast and Various and The Best of Gregory Benford
- "Shakers of the Earth" The Ultimate Dinosaur (October 1992), collected in Matter's End
- "The Dark Backward" Amazing Stories (February 1993), collected in Worlds Vast and Various and The Best of Gregory Benford
- "Doing Alien" The Magazine of Fantasy & Science Fiction (March 1994), collected in Worlds Vast and Various
- "The Bigger One" Science Fiction Age (May 1994), collected in Matter's End
- "Not of an Age" Weird Tales from Shakespeare (July 1994)
- "The Trojan Cat" (with Mark O. Martin) Man-Kzin Wars VI (July 1994)
- "Soon Comes the Night" Asimov's Science Fiction (August 1994), nominated for the Nebula Award in 1996
- "Strong Instinct" (with Mark O. Martin) South From Midnight (October 1994)
- "Side Effect" Matter's End (January 1995)
- "Sleepstory" Matter's End (January 1995)
- "Deep Eyes" Analog Science Fiction and Fact (April 1995)
- "Kollapse" Interzone #94 (April 1995), reprinted in Science Fiction Age (May 1995) and Lamps on the Brow, collected in Worlds Vast and Various
- "A Tapestry of Thought" Amazing Stories: The Anthology (May 1995), reprinted in Amazing Stories (Winter 1995)
- "A Desperate Calculus" (as "Sterling Blake", aka "A Calculus of Desperation") New Legends (May 1995), reprinted in Armageddons, collected in Worlds Vast and Various and The Best of Gregory Benford
- "High Abyss" New Legends (May 1995), collected in Worlds Vast and Various
- "A Worm in the Well" Analog Science Fiction and Fact (November 1995), selected for Year's Best SF, reprinted in Free Space (revised as Early Bird) and The Space Opera Renaissance, collected in Worlds Vast and Various and Anomalies
- "Immersion" Science Fiction Age (March 1996), 1997 SF Chronicle Award winner and 1997 Hugo Award nominee, selected for The Year's Best Science Fiction: Fourteenth Annual Collection, reprinted in The Hard SF Renaissance, collected in Immersion and Other Short Novels
- "Paris Conquers All" (with David Brin) The Magazine of Fantasy & Science Fiction (March 1996), reprinted in War of the Worlds: Global Dispatches (June 1996)
- "Afterword: Retrospective" (with David Brin) War of the Worlds: Global Dispatches (June 1996)
- "Zoomers" Future Net (October 1996), selected for Year's Best SF 2 (1997), collected in Worlds Vast and Various and The Best of Gregory Benford
- "The Voice" Science Fiction Age (May 1997), selected for Year's Best SF 3, collected in Worlds Vast and Various and The Best of Gregory Benford
- "New Ninevehs" Future Histories (June 1997)
- "Galaxia" Science Fiction Age (July 1997)
- "A Cold Dry Cradle" (with Elisabeth Malartre) Science Fiction Age (November 1997), selected for The Year's Best Science Fiction: Fifteenth Annual Collection, later expanded as The Martian Race
- "Ordinary Aliens" The UFO Files (February 1998)
- "A Pit Which Has No Bottom" Age of Wonder #1 (April 1998)
- "Slow Symphonies of Mass and Time" Lord of the Fantastic: Stories in Honor of Roger Zelazny (September 1998), collected in The Best of Gregory Benford
- "A Dance to Strange Musics" Science Fiction Age (November 1998), selected for Year's Best SF 4, reprinted in Explorers: SF Adventures to Far Horizons and The Mammoth Book of Mindblowing SF, collected in Worlds Vast and Various and The Best of Gregory Benford
- "A Hunger for the Infinite" Far Horizons (May 1999), collected in The Galactic Center Companion, 2nd Edition
- "Taking Control" Nature (August 3, 2000)
- "Three Gods" Interzone #171 (September 2001)
- "Ménage à Trois" Interzone #173 (November 2001)
- "Brink" Sci Fiction (December 5, 2001)
- "Anomalies" Redshift: Extreme Visions of Speculative Fiction (December 2001), selected for Science Fiction: The Best of 2001 and Year's Best SF 7, reprinted in The Mammoth Book of Extreme Science Fiction, collected in Anomalies and The Best of Gregory Benford
- "Around the Curve of a Cosmos" Sci Fiction (March 6, 2002)
- "Mammoth Dawn" (with Kevin J. Anderson) Analog Science Fiction and Fact (July 2002)
- "The Goldilocks Problem" Once Upon a Galaxy (September 2002)
- "The Clear Blue Seas of Luna" Asimov's Science Fiction (October 2002), selected for The Year's Best Science Fiction: Twentieth Annual Collection, reprinted in Clarkesworld #102 (March 2015)
- "On the Edge" Stars: Original Stories Based on the Songs of Janis Ian (August 2003)
- "Naturals" Interzone #191 (September 2003)
- "The Hydrogen Wall" Asimov's Science Fiction (October 2003) (first English language publication), selected for Year's Best SF 9
- "Station Spaces" Space Stations (March 2004)
- "The First Commandment" Sci Fiction (May 19, 2004), selected for Year's Best SF 10
- "Blood's a Rover" Cosmic Tales: Adventures in Sol System (June 2004)
- "On the Brane" Oceans of the Mind (Winter 2004), selected for Year's Best SF 11
- "Twenty-Two Centimetres" Oceans of the Mind (Winter 2004), reprinted in Other Worlds Than These, collected in The Best of Gregory Benford
- "Beyond Pluto" Cosmic Tales II: Adventures in Far Futures (February 2005)
- "A Life with a Semisent" Nature (May 12, 2005), reprinted in Continuum Science Fiction (October 2006) and Futures from Nature, collected in Anomalies and The Best of Gregory Benford
- "The Pain Gun" Analog Science Fiction and Fact (July 2005)
- "Iraqi Heat" In the Shadow of Evil (August 2005)
- "The Man Who Wasn't There" Cosmos (August 2005), reprinted in Jim Baen's Universe (October 2006), collected in Anomalies
- "Applied Mathematical Theology" Nature (March 2, 2006), selected for Year's Best SF 12, collected in Anomalies and The Best of Gregory Benford
- "Isaac from the Outside" (poem) Star*Line (May 2006), collected in Anomalies
- "Bow Shock" Jim Baen's Universe (June 2006), selected for The Best of Jim Baen's Universe and The Year's Best Science Fiction: Twenty-Fourth Annual Collection, collected in The Best of Gregory Benford
- "Robowar" Jim Baen's Universe (August 2006)
- "The Gorgon's Head" (with Elisabeth Malartre) Space Cadets (August 2006)
- "I Could've Done Better" (with David Brin) Jim Baen's Universe (February 2007)
- "Dark Heaven" Alien Crimes (April 2007), nominated for the Nebula Award in 2009, selected for The Year's Best Science Fiction: Twenty-Fifth Annual Collection
- "The Worm Turns" The New Space Opera (June 2007), collected in Anomalies
- "How to Write a Scientific Paper" This Is My Funniest 2 (October 2007)
- "Reasons Not to Publish" Nature Physics (December 2007), selected for Year's Best SF 13, collected in The Best of Gregory Benford
- "The Champagne Award" Nature (February 14, 2008), collected in Anomalies and The Best of Gregory Benford
- "SETI for Profit" Nature (April 24, 2008)
- "At the Singularity" (poem) Star*Line (May 2008)
- "Orbitfall" Jim Baen's Universe (December 2008), reprinted in Sentinels: In Honor of Arthur C. Clarke
- "Ascending Everest" Jim Baen's Universe (February 2009)
- "Caveat Time Traveller" Nature (April 2, 2009), reprinted in The Mammoth Book of Time Travel SF, reprinted in Anomalies
- "Black Smoker" Jim Baen's Universe (April 2009)
- "The Mars Mat" Jim Baen's Universe (June 2009)
- "Lathe of Evolution" Jim Baen's Universe (August & October 2009)
- "Paradise Afternoon" Flurb #8 (September 2009)
- "The Grace of Tragedy" Jim Baen's Universe (February 2010)
- "Tiny Elephants" Jim Baen's Universe (February 2010)
- "The Final Now" Tor.com (March 4, 2010), collected in Anomalies
- "Penumbra" Nature (June 10, 2010), selected for Year's Best SF 16, collected in The Best of Gregory Benford
- "Shadows of the Lost" (with Elisabeth Malartre) Gateways (July 2010)
- "Gravity's Whispers" Nature (July 15, 2010), collected in Anomalies and The Best of Gregory Benford
- "Mercies" Engineering Infinity (December 2010), selected for Year's Best SF 17, collected in Anomalies and The Best of Gregory Benford
- "Eagle" Welcome to the Greenhouse (February 2011), reprinted in Loosed Upon the World, collected in The Best of Gregory Benford
- "Grace Immaculate" Tor.com (October 19, 2011), collected in The Best of Gregory Benford
- "The Sigma Structure Symphony" The Palencar Project (February 2012), selected for Year's Best SF: 18, collected in The Best of Gregory Benford
- "Comes the Evolution" Anomalies (March 2012), collected in The Best of Gregory Benford
- "Ol' Gator" Anomalies (March 2012)
- "Backscatter" Tor.com (April 3, 2013), collected in The Best of Gregory Benford
- "Think Big" Nature (July 18, 2013)
- "Coda: Atmosphaera Incognita" Starship Century: Towards the Grandest Horizon (August 2013)
- "The Man Who Sold the Stars" Starship Century: Towards the Grandest Horizon (August 2013), reprinted in Hieroglyph: Stories and Visions for a Better Future
- "Leaving Night" Lightspeed (December 2013)
- "Bloodpride" Multiverse: Exploring Poul Anderson's Worlds (May 2014)
- "Lady with Fox" Carbide Tipped Pens: Seventeen Tales of Hard Science Fiction (December 2014)
- "Aspects" Meeting Infinity (November 2015)
- "Vortex" The Magazine of Fantasy & Science Fiction (January–February 2016)
- "Elderjoy" Analog Science Fiction and Fact (March 2016)

== Non-fiction ==
- Benford, Gregory (February 1994). "Ten thousand years of solitude". Science. F&SF. 86 (2).
- Benford, Gregory (1995). "Old Legends" (essay), first published in New Legends, ISBN 978-0-09-931881-1
- — (1998). Habitats in space.
- — (1999). Deep time : how humanity communicates across millennia. HarperCollins. ISBN 9780380975372.
- Benford, Gregory & Elisabeth Malartre (2007). Beyond human : the new world of cyborgs and androids. Forge Books. ISBN 9780765310828.
- The Wonderful Future That Never Was (October 2010, with the Editors of Popular Mechanics)
- The Amazing Weapons That Never Were (2012, with the Editors of Popular Mechanics)

A Scientist's Notebook columns in The Magazine of Fantasy & Science Fiction

- Benford, Gregory (June 2000). "Sunshine technopolis". F&SF. 98 (6): 119–130. Archived from the original on November 25, 2004.
- — (July 2000). "When technology fails". F&SF. 99 (1): 104–109. Archived from the original on December 27, 2004.
- — (September 2000). "Risks and realities". F&SF. 99 (3): 112–123. Archived from the original on December 27, 2004.
- — (April 2001). "Pascal's terror". F&SF. 100 (4): 130–135. Archived from the original on December 27, 2004.
