= Think Like a Dinosaur =

1995 science fiction novelette by James Patrick Kelly

"Think Like a Dinosaur" was originally published in the June 1995 issue of Asimov's Science Fiction

"Think Like a Dinosaur" is a science fiction novelette written by James Patrick Kelly, originally published in the June 1995 issue of Asimov's Science Fiction magazine.

== Significance ==
The story won the 1996 Hugo Award for Best Novelette, the Asimov's Reader Poll Award, and the SF Chronicle Award. It was also nominated for the Locus Poll Award and the Nebula Award. Since its original publication, "Think Like a Dinosaur" has been reprinted in several science fiction anthologies. In 2001, it was adapted as the "Think Like a Dinosaur" episode of The Outer Limits TV series. It was adapted into an audio play for Seeing Ear Theater.

== Plot ==
The story postulates a transportation device supervised by the Hanen, a dinosaur-like race of aliens that can transmit an exact copy of a person's body to distant planets. The original body is disintegrated once reception at the destination is confirmed. The Hanen, nicknamed "dinos" by their human associates, looks down on humans for being scared of this process, making fun of them for being "weepy". In the story, a woman is teleported to an alien planet, but the original is not disintegrated because reception cannot be confirmed at the time. Reception is later confirmed, and the original, not surprisingly, declines to "balance the equation" by re-entering the scanning and disintegrating device and attempts to escape. This creates an ethical quandary that is viewed quite differently by the cold-blooded aliens who provided the teleportation technology, and their warm-blooded human associates. The story concludes with the narrator, a human intern working on the space station housing the device, agreeing with the Hanen's philosophy and murdering the woman to balance the equation and secure the aliens' continued help in humanity's advancement.

== Publication history ==
"Think Like a Dinosaur" was originally published in the June 1995 issue of Asimov's Science Fiction magazine. It was subsequently reprinted.

=== Anthologies ===
- Year's Best SF (1996, edited by David G. Hartwell)
- The Year's Best Science Fiction: Thirteenth Annual Collection (1996, edited by Gardner Dozois)
- Nebula Awards 31 (1997, edited by Pamela Sargent)
- The Hard SF Renaissance (2002, edited by David G. Hartwell and Kathryn Cramer)

=== Collections ===
- Think Like a Dinosaur and Other Stories by James Patrick Kelley (1997)
