= Dinosaurs II =

1995 anthology edited by Jack Dann and Gardner Dozois

- Cover of first edition
- Editors: Jack Dann and Gardner Dozois
- Cover artist: Bob Eggleton
- Language: English
- Series: Jack Dann and Gardner Dozois Ace anthology series
- Genre: Science fiction
- Publisher: Ace Books
- Publication date: 1995
- Publication place: United States
- Media type: Print (paperback)
- Pages: xv, 253
- ISBN: 0-441-00285-4
- Preceded by: Angels!
- Followed by: Hackers

Dinosaurs II is a themed anthology of science fiction short works edited by Jack Dann and Gardner Dozois. It was first published in paperback by Ace Books in December 1995. It was reissued as an ebook by Baen Books in March 2013.

The book collects eleven novellas, novelettes and short stories by various science fiction authors, together with a preface by the editors.

The first dinosaur-themed anthology in the series, Dinosaurs!, was published in 1990.

== Contents ==
- "Preface" (Jack Dann and Gardner Dozois)
- "The Big Splash" (L. Sprague de Camp)
- "Just Like Old Times" (Robert J. Sawyer)
- "The Virgin and the Dinosaur" (R. Garcia y Robertson)
- "The Odd Old Bird" (Avram Davidson)
- "Bernie" (Ian McDowell)
- "Small Deer" (Clifford D. Simak)
- "Dinosaur Pliés" (R. V. Branham)
- "Day of the Hunters" (Isaac Asimov)
- "Herding with the Hadrosaurs" (Michael Bishop)
- "Ontogeny Recapitulates Phylogeny" (R. Garcia y Robertson)
- "Trembling Earth" (Allen Steele)
