= Kathryn Cramer =

American writer

- Born: Kathryn Elizabeth Cramer; April 16, 1962 (age 64); Bloomington, Indiana, U.S.
- Education: Columbia University
- Occupation: Editor
- Writing career
- Genres: Science fiction, fantasy, horror, hypertext fiction
- Movement: Hard science fiction
- Website: www.kathryncramer.com

Kathryn Elizabeth Cramer (born April 16, 1962) is an American science fiction writer, editor, and literary critic.

== Early years ==
Kathryn Cramer is the daughter of physicist John G. Cramer. She grew up in Seattle and graduated from Columbia University with degrees in mathematics and American studies.

== Career ==
Cramer has worked for five literary agencies, most notably the Virginia Kidd Agency and Eastgate Systems, and for several software companies, including consulting with Wolfram Research in the Scientific Information Group. She co-founded The New York Review of Science Fiction in 1988 with David G. Hartwell and others, and was its co-editor until 1991 and again since 1996. It has been nominated (as of 2007) for the Hugo Award for Best Semiprozine every year of its existence, fifteen times under her co-editorship.

Cramer was the hypertext fiction editor at Eastgate Systems in the early 1990s. She was part of the Global Connection Project, a joint project of Carnegie Mellon University, NASA, Google, and National Geographic using Google Earth and other tools following the 2005 Pakistan earthquake.

Cramer has written a number of essays published in the New York Review of Science Fiction. Book reviews for that journal include such works as This is the Way the World Ends by James Morrow, Ellipse of Uncertainty: An Introduction to Postmodern Fantasy by Lance Olsen, and Amnesia Moon by Jonathan Lethem. She is a contributor to the Encarta article on science fiction and wrote the chapter on hard science fiction for the Cambridge Companion to Science Fiction ed. Farah Mendlesohn & Edward James. Several of her essays have been reprinted, for example "Science Fiction and the Adventures of the Spherical Cow" (NYRSF August 1988) in Visions of Wonder, ed. Milton T. Wolf & David G. Hartwell (Tor 1996).

== Personal life ==
Cramer was married to David G. Hartwell from 1997 until his death in January 2016. She lives in Westport, New York, with their two children.

== Bibliography ==
=== Anthologies ===
- The Architecture of Fear (1987) with Peter D. Pautz – winner of the World Fantasy Award for Best Anthology
- Masterpieces of Fantasy and Enchantment (1988) with David G. Hartwell
- Spirits of Christmas (1989) with David G. Hartwell, Tor Fantasy, ISBN 0-8125-5159-1.
- Masterpieces of Fantasy and Wonder (1989, GuildAmerica, ISBN 1-56865-039-6; 1994, St. Martin's Press, ISBN 0-312-11024-3) with David G. Hartwell
- Walls of Fear (1990), Avon Books, ISBN 0-380-70789-6 – a World Fantasy Award nominee
- The Ascent of Wonder: The Evolution of Hard SF (1994) with David G. Hartwell, ISBN 0-312-85509-5
- The Hard SF Renaissance (2002) with David G. Hartwell, Orb books, ISBN 0-312-87636-X
- The Space Opera Renaissance (2006) with David G. Hartwell, Tor Books, ISBN 0-7653-0617-4
- Hieroglyph: Stories and Visions for a Better Future (2014) with Ed Finn, William Morrow.

=== Anthology series ===
The Year's Best Fantasy is a fantasy anthology series edited by David G. Hartwell and Kathryn Cramer.

- Year's Best Fantasy 1 through 9 (2001–2009) with David G. Hartwell (HarperCollins 2001–2005, Tachyon Publications 2006–2007)

The Year's Best SF is a science fiction anthology series edited by David G. Hartwell and Kathryn Cramer. Hartwell started the series in 1996, and has been co-editing it with Cramer since 2002. It is published by HarperCollins under the Eos imprint. The creators of the books are not involved with the similarly titled Year's Best Science Fiction series.

- Year's Best SF 6 (2001)
- Year's Best SF 7 (2002)
- Year's Best SF 8 (2003)
- Year's Best SF 9 (2004)
- Year's Best SF 10 (2005)
- Year's Best SF 11 (2006)
- Year's Best SF 12 (2007)
- Year's Best SF 13 (2008)
- Year's Best SF 14 (2009)
- Year's Best SF 15 (2010)
- Year's Best SF 16 (2011)
- Year's Best SF 17 (2012)

=== Short fiction ===
- "Forbidden Knowledge" in Mathenauts: Tales of Mathematical Wonder, ed. Rudy Rucker (1987, ISBN 0-87795-891-2).
- "Speaker for the Reticent", written with Greg Cox, in The New York Review of Science Fiction (December 1988).
- "The End of Everything" in Asimov's Science Fiction, Vol 14, No 10, Whole No 161 (October 1990), pp. 107–111.
- "In Small & Large Pieces" in The Eastgate Quarterly Review of Hypertext, Volume 1, No. 3, Eastgate Systems (1994). (a work of hypertext speculative fiction)
- "Disextinction" in Nature Magazine (2001, ISBN 0-765-31805-9).
- "Sandcastles: a Dystopia" in Nature Magazine (2005).
- "You, in Emulation" in Nature Magazine (October 20, 2011).
- "Am I Free to Go?" on Tor.com, 2012.

=== Poems ===
- "The Mourners" in Lady Churchill's Rosebud Wristlet, #11 (November 2002)
- "What Stopped Jack" in Lady Churchill's Rosebud Wristlet, #11 (November 2002)

=== Selected essays ===
- "Science Fiction and the Adventures of the Spherical Cow" in New York Review of Science Fiction (September 1988). Anthologized as: "Science Fiction & the Adventures of the Spherical Cow" in Visions of Wonder (ISBN 978-0-312-86224-4).
- "Democrazy, the Marketplace, and the American Way: Remarks on the Year 1990 in Science Fiction (Nebula Awards 26)" in Nebula Awards 26, ed. James Morrow (1992, ISBN 0-15-164934-0).
- "Science Fiction for What? Remarks on the Year 1991 (Nebula Awards 27)" in Nebula Awards 27, ed. James Morrow (1993, ISBN 0-15-164935-9).
- "Philip K. Dick: The Greatest Novels", co-authored with David Alexander Smith, David G. Hartwell, Paul Di Filippo, Alexander Jablokov, and Eric Van, in The New York Review of Science Fiction (June 1994). Transcribed from Panel 1, The First American Philip K. Dick Convention, September 25, 1993.
- How Shit Became Shinola: Definition and Redefinition of Space Opera with David G. Hartwell, SFRevu (August 2003).
- "Hard Science Fiction" in The Cambridge Companion to Science Fiction, ed. Edward James, Farah Mendlesohn (2006, ISBN 0-521-81626-2).

=== Interviews ===
- "Hypertext Horizon: An Interview With Kathryn Cramer" (ca. 1994) by Harry Goldstein (Transcript of a live on-line interview over Sonicnet)
- "Interview With Kathryn Cramer, Co-editor of Hieroglyph" by New Books Network (Podcast on New Books in Science Fiction and Fantasy)

== See also ==
- Hard science fiction
- Hypertext fiction
- Space opera
- The New York Review of Science Fiction
