= Year's Best SF 11 =

2006 anthology edited by David G. Hartwell and Kathryn Cramer

- Author: Edited by David G. Hartwell and Kathryn Cramer
- Cover artist: Dominic Harman
- Language: English
- Series: Year's Best SF
- Genre: Science fiction
- Publisher: Eos
- Publication date: 2006
- Publication place: United States
- Media type: Print (paperback)
- Pages: 496 pp
- ISBN: 0-06-087341-8
- OCLC: 69998796
- Preceded by: Year's Best SF 10
- Followed by: Year's Best SF 12

Year's Best SF 11 is a science fiction anthology edited by David G. Hartwell and Kathryn Cramer that was published in 2006. It is the eleventh in the Year's Best SF series.

== Contents ==
The book itself, as well as each of the stories, has a short introduction by the editors.

- David Langford: "New Hope for the Dead" (Originally in Nature, 2005)
- Hannu Rajaniemi: "Deus Ex Homine" (Originally in Nova Scotia: New Scottish Speculative Fiction, 2005)
- Gardner R. Dozois: "When the Great Days Came" (Originally in F&SF, 2005)
- Daryl Gregory: "Second Person, Present Tense" (Originally in Asimov's, 2005)
- Justina Robson: "Dreadnought" (Originally in Nature, 2005)
- Ken MacLeod: "A Case of Consilience" (Originally in Nova Scotia, 2005)
- Tobias S. Buckell: "Toy Planes" (Originally in Nature, 2005)
- Neal Asher: "Mason's Rats" (Originally in Asimov's, 2005)
- Vonda N. McIntyre: "A Modest Proposal" (Originally in Nature, 2005)
- Rudy Rucker: "Guadalupe and Hieronymus Bosch" (Originally in Interzone, 2005)
- Peter F. Hamilton: "The Forever Kitten" (Originally in Nature, 2005)
- Matthew Jarpe: "City of Reason" (Originally in Asimov's, 2005)
- Bruce Sterling: "Ivory Tower" (Originally in Nature, 2005)
- Lauren McLaughlin: "Sheila" (Originally in Interzone, 2005)
- Paul McAuley: "Rats of the System" (Originally in Constellations, 2005)
- Larissa Lai: "I Love Liver: A Romance" (Originally in Nature, 2005)
- James Patrick Kelly: "The Edge of Nowhere" (Originally in Asimov's, 2005)
- Ted Chiang: "What's Expected of Us" (Originally in Nature, 2005)
- Michael Swanwick: "Girls and Boys, Come Out to Play" (Originally in Asimov's, 2005)
- Stephen Baxter: "Lakes of Light" (Originally in Constellations, 2005)
- Oliver Morton: "The Albian Message" (Originally in Nature, 2005)
- Bud Sparhawk: "Bright Red Star" (Originally in Asimov's, 2005)
- Alaya Dawn Johnson: "Third Day Lights" (Originally in Interzone, 2005)
- Greg Bear: "Ram Shift Phase 2" (Originally in Nature, 2005)
- Gregory Benford: "On the Brane" (Originally in Gateways, 2005)
- R. Garcia y Robertson: "Oxygen Rising" (Originally in Asimov's, 2005)
- Adam Roberts: "And Future King..." (Originally in Postscripts, 2005)
- Alastair Reynolds: "Beyond the Aquila Rift" (Originally in Constellations, 2005)
- Joe Haldeman: "Angel of Light" (Originally in Cosmos, 2005)
- Liz Williams: "Ikiryoh" (Originally in Asimov's, 2005)
- Cory Doctorow: "I, Robot" (Originally in The Infinite Matrix, 2005)
