= Year's Best SF 8 =

2003 anthology edited by David G. Hartwell and Kathryn Cramer

- Author: Edited by David G. Hartwell and Kathryn Cramer
- Cover artist: Chris Moore
- Language: English
- Series: Year's Best SF
- Genre: Science fiction
- Publisher: Eos
- Publication date: 2003
- Publication place: United States
- Media type: Print (paperback)
- Pages: 496 pp
- ISBN: 0-06-106453-X
- OCLC: 52144384
- Preceded by: Year's Best SF 7
- Followed by: Year's Best SF 9

Year's Best SF 8 is a science fiction anthology edited by David G. Hartwell and Kathryn Cramer that was published in 2003. It is the eighth in the Year's Best SF series.

== Contents ==
The book itself, as well as each of the stories, has a short introduction by the editors.

- Bruce Sterling: "In Paradise" (Originally in F&SF, 2002)
- Michael Swanwick: "Slow Life" (Originally in Analog, 2002)
- Eleanor Arnason: "Knapsack Poems" (Originally in Asimov's, 2002)
- Geoffrey A. Landis: "At Dorado" (Originally in Asimov's, 2002)
- Robert Reed: "Coelacanths" (Originally in F&SF, 2002)
- Ken Wharton: "Flight Correction" (Originally in Analog, 2002)
- Robert Sheckley: "Shoes" (Originally in F&SF, 2002)
- Charles Sheffield: "The Diamond Drill" (Originally in Analog, 2002)
- Ursula K. Le Guin: "The Seasons of the Ansarac" (Originally in The Infinite Matrix, 2002)
- Richard Chwedyk: "A Few Kind Words for A. E. Van Vogt" (Originally in Tales of the Unanticipated, 2002)
- Charles Stross: "Halo" (Originally in Asimov's, 2002)
- Terry Bisson: "I Saw the Light" (Originally in Sci Fiction, 2002)
- A. M. Dellamonica: "A Slow Day at the Gallery" (Originally in Asimov's, 2002)
- Paul Di Filippo: "Ailoura" (Originally in Once Upon a Galaxy, 2002)
- J. R. Dunn: "The Names of All the Spirits" (Originally in Sci Fiction, 2002)
- Carol Emshwiller: "Grandma" (Originally in F&SF, 2002)
- Neal Asher: "Snow in the Desert" (Originally in Spectrum SF, 2002)
- Greg Egan: "Singleton" (Originally in Interzone, 2002)
- Robert Onopa: "Geropods" (Originally in F&SF, 2002)
- Jack Williamson: "Afterlife" (Originally in F&SF, 2002)
- Gene Wolfe: "Shields of Mars" (Originally in Mars Probes, 2002)
- Nancy Kress: "Patent Infringement" (Originally in Asimov's, 2002)
- Michael Moorcock: "Lost Sorceress of the Silent Citadel" (Originally in Mars Probes, 2002)
