= Michael and the Magic Man =

1980 novel by Kathleen M. Sidney

First edition (publ. Berkley Books) Cover art by Carlos Ochagavia

Michael and the Magic Man is a novel by Kathleen M. Sidney published in 1980.

== Plot summary ==
A group of psychics travel America in a van, defending the world from psychic alien invaders.

== Reception ==
Greg Costikyan reviewed Michael and the Magic Man in Ares Magazine #3 and commented that "Sidney is a writer of considerable power; Michael and the Magic Man is as innovative as it is unusual."

Spider Robinson reviewed Michael and the Magic Man for Analog Science Fiction/Science Fact, and commented that "Good characterization, good sense of mood – Kathy is still feeling for her novel-voice, but my only real objection is that the hero is rather ineffectual for my taste. He's not an actor, he's a reactor, for most of the book. Still, this is a cut above most first novels."

== Reviews ==
- The New York Review of Science Fiction
- Kliatt Young Adult Paperback Book Guide
