= Year's Best SF 12 =

2007 anthology edited by David G. Hartwell and Kathryn Cramer

- Author: Edited by David G. Hartwell and Kathryn Cramer
- Cover artist: John Harris
- Language: English
- Series: Year's Best SF
- Genre: Science fiction
- Publisher: Eos
- Publication date: 2007
- Publication place: United States
- Media type: Print (paperback)
- Pages: 496 pp
- ISBN: 0-06-125208-5
- OCLC: 124945433
- Preceded by: Year's Best SF 11
- Followed by: Year's Best SF 13

Year's Best SF 12 is a science fiction anthology edited by David G. Hartwell and Kathryn Cramer that was published in 2007. It is the twelfth in the Year's Best SF series.

== Contents ==
The book itself, as well as each of the stories, has a short introduction by the editors.

- Nancy Kress: "Nano Comes to Clifford Falls" (Originally in Asimov's, 2006)
- Terry Bisson: "Brother, Can You Spare a Dime?" (Originally in Golden Age SF: Tales of a Bygone Future, 2006)
- Cory Doctorow: "When Sysadmins Ruled the Earth" (Originally in Flurb, 2006)
- Heather Lindsley: "Just Do It!" (Originally in F&SF, 2006)
- Gardner R. Dozois: "Counterfactual" (Originally in F&SF, 2006)
- Edd Vick: "Moon Does Run" (Originally in Electric Velocipede, 2006)
- Mary Rosenblum: "Home Movies" (Originally in Asimov's, 2006)
- Rudy Rucker: "Chu and the Nants" (Originally in Asimov's, 2006)
- Ian Creasey: "Silence in Florence" (Originally in Asimov's, 2006)
- Kameron Hurley: "The Women of Our Occupation" (Originally in Strange Horizons, 2006)
- Claude Lalumière: "This Is the Ice Age" (Originally in Mythspring, 2006)
- Eileen Gunn: "Speak, Geek" (Originally in Nature, 2006)
- Joe Haldeman: "Expedition, with Recipes" (Originally in Elemental, 2006)
- Liz Williams: "The Age of Ice" (Originally in Asimov's, 2006)
- Michael Flynn: "Dawn, and Sunset, and the Colours of the Earth" (Originally in Asimov's, 2006)
- Gregory Benford: "Applied Mathematical Theology" (Originally in Nature, 2006)
- Carol Emshwiller: "Quill" (Originally in Firebirds Rising, 2006)
- Alastair Reynolds: "Tiger, Burning" (Originally in Forbidden Planets, 2006)
- Paul J. McAuley: "Dead Men Walking" (Originally in Asimov's, 2006)
- Daryl Gregory: "Damascus" (Originally in F&SF, 2006)
- Michael Swanwick: "Tin Marsh" (Originally in Asimov's, 2006)
- Ian R. MacLeod: "Taking Good Care of Myself" (Originally in Nature, 2006)
- Stephen Baxter: "The Lowland Expedition" (Originally in Analog, 2006)
- Wil McCarthy: "Heisenberg Elementary" (Originally in Asimov's, 2006)
- Robert Reed: "Rwanda" (Originally in Asimov's, 2006)
- Charlie Rosenkrantz: "Preemption" (Originally in Analog, 2006)
