= Year's Best SF 15 =

2010 anthology edited by David G. Hartwell and Kathryn Cramer

- Author: Edited by David G. Hartwell and Kathryn Cramer
- Cover artist: Dominic Harman
- Language: English
- Series: Year's Best SF
- Genre: Science fiction
- Publisher: Eos
- Publication date: June 2010
- Publication place: United States
- Media type: Print (paperback)
- Pages: 494 pp
- ISBN: 978-0-06-172175-5
- OCLC: 341703015
- Preceded by: Year's Best SF 14
- Followed by: Year's Best SF 16

Year's Best SF 15 is a science fiction anthology edited by David G. Hartwell and Kathryn Cramer that was published in June 2010. It is the fifteenth in the Year's Best SF series.

== Contents ==
The book itself, as well as each of the stories, has a short introduction by the editors.

- Vandana Singh: "Infinities" (Originally in The Woman Who Thought She Was a Planet and Other Stories, 2008)
- Robert Charles Wilson: "This Peaceable Land; or, The Unbearable Vision of Harriet Beecher Stowe" (Originally in Other Rifts, 2009)
- Yoon Ha Lee: "The Unstrung Zither" (Originally in F&SF, 2009)
- Bruce Sterling: "Black Swan" (Originally in Interzone, 2009)
- Nancy Kress: "Exegesis" (Originally in Asimov's, 2009)
- Ian Creasey: "Erosion" (Originally in Asimov's, 2009)
- Gwyneth Jones: "Collision" (Originally in When It Changed, 2009)
- Gene Wolfe: "Donovan Sent Us" (Originally published online by Other Earths, 2009)
- Marissa K. Lingen: "The Calculus Plague" (Originally in Analog, 2009)
- Peter Watts: "The Island" (Originally in The New Space Opera 2, 2009)
- Paul Cornell: "One of Our Bastards Is Missing" (Originally in The Solaris Book of New Science Fiction: Volume Three, 2009)
- Sarah L. Edwards: "Lady of the White-Spired City" (Originally in Interzone, 2009)
- Brian Stableford: "The Highway Code" (Originally in We Think, Therefore We Are, 2009)
- Peter M. Ball: "On the Destruction of Copenhagen by the War-Machines of the Merfolk" (Originally in Strange Horizons, 2009)
- Alastair Reynolds: "The Fixation" (Originally in The Solaris Book of New Science Fiction: Volume Three, 2009)
- Brenda Cooper: "In Their Garden" (Originally in Asimov's, 2009)
- Geoff Ryman: "Blocked" (Originally in F&SF, 2009)
- Michael Cassutt: "The Last Apostle" (Originally in Asimov's, 2009)
- Charles Oberndorf: "Another Life" (Originally in F&SF, 2009)
- Mary Robinette Kowal: "The Consciousness Problem" (Originally in Asimov's, 2009)
- Stephen Baxter: "Tempest 43" (Originally in We Think, Therefore We Are, 2009)
- Genevieve Valentine: "Bespoke" (Originally in Strange Horizons, 2009)
- Eric James Stone: "Attitude Adjustment" (Originally in Analog, 2009)
- Chris Roberson: "Edison's Frankenstein" (Originally in Edison's Frankenstein, 2009)
