= Year's Best SF 14 =

2009 anthology edited by David G. Hartwell and Kathryn Cramer

- Author: Edited by David G. Hartwell and Kathryn Cramer
- Language: English
- Series: Year's Best SF
- Genre: Science fiction
- Publisher: Eos
- Publication date: 2009
- Publication place: United States
- Media type: Print (paperback)
- Pages: 512 pp
- ISBN: 978-0-06-172174-8
- OCLC: 341703015
- Preceded by: Year's Best SF 13
- Followed by: Year's Best SF 15

Year's Best SF 14 is a science fiction anthology edited by David G. Hartwell and Kathryn Cramer that was published in 2009. It is the fourteenth in the Year's Best SF series.

== Contents ==
The book itself, as well as each of the stories, has a short introduction by the editors.

- Carolyn Ives Gilman: "Arkfall" (Originally in F&SF, 2008)
- Neil Gaiman: "Orange" (Originally in The Starry Rift, 2008)
- Kathleen Ann Goonan: "Memory Dog" (Originally in Asimov's, 2008)
- Paolo Bacigalupi: "Pump Six" (Originally in Pump Six and Other Stories, 2008)
- Elizabeth Bear & Sarah Monette: "Boojum" (Originally in Fast Ships, Black Sails, 2008)
- Ted Chiang: "Exhalation" (Originally in Eclipse 2, 2008)
- M. Rickert: "Traitor" (Originally in F&SF, 2008)
- Cory Doctorow: "The Things that Make Me Weak and Strange Get Engineered Away" (Originally published online by Tor Books, 2008)
- Vandana Singh: "Oblivion: A Journey" (Originally in Clockwork Phoenix, 2008)
- Robert Reed: "The House Left Empty" (Originally in Asimov's, 2008)
- Michael Swanwick: "The Scarecrow’s Boy" (Originally in F&SF, 2008)
- Ted Kosmatka: "N-Words" (Originally in Seeds of Change, 2008)
- Alastair Reynolds: "Fury" (Originally in Eclipse 2, 2008)
- Gwyneth Jones (as Ann Halam): "Cheats" (Originally in The Starry Rift, 2008)
- Jason Sanford: "The Ships Like Clouds, Risen By Their Rain" (Originally in Interzone, 2008)
- Mary Rosenblum: "The Egg Man" (Originally in Asimov's, 2008)
- Daryl Gregory: "Glass" (Originally in MIT Technology Review, 2008)
- Jeff VanderMeer: "Fixing Hanover" (Originally in Extraordinary Engines, 2008)
- Rudy Rucker: "Message Found in a Gravity Wave" (Originally in Nature Physics, 2008)
- Tobias Buckell & Karl Schroeder: "Mitigation" (Originally in Fast Forward 2, 2008)
- Sue Burke: "Spiders" (Originally in Asimov's, 2008)
