= Year's Best SF 13 =

2008 anthology edited by David G. Hartwell and Kathryn Cramer

- Author: Edited by David G. Hartwell and Kathryn Cramer
- Cover artist: Paul Youll
- Language: English
- Series: Year's Best SF
- Genre: Science fiction
- Publisher: Eos
- Publication date: 2008
- Publication place: United States
- Media type: Print (paperback)
- Pages: 512 pp
- ISBN: 0-06-125209-3
- OCLC: 213109824
- LC Class: CPB Box no. 2784 vol. 24
- Preceded by: Year's Best SF 12
- Followed by: Year's Best SF 14

Year's Best SF 13 is a science fiction anthology edited by David G. Hartwell and Kathryn Cramer that was published in 2008. It is the thirteenth in the Year's Best SF series.

== Contents ==
The book itself, as well as each of the stories, has a short introduction by the editors.

- Johanna Sinisalo: "Baby Doll" (Original English translation in The SFWA European Hall of Fame, 2007)
- Tony Ballantyne: "Aristotle OS" (Originally in Fast Forward 1, 2007)
- John Kessel: "The Last American" (Originally in Foundation 100, 2007)
- Gene Wolfe: "Memorare" (Originally in F&SF, 2007)
- Kage Baker: "Plotters and Shooters" (Originally in Fast Forward 1, 2007)
- Peter Watts: "Repeating the Past" (Originally in Nature, 2007)
- Stephen Baxter: "No More Stories" (Originally in Fast Forward 1, 2007)
- Robyn Hitchcock: "They Came From the Future" (Originally in Fast Forward 1, 2007)
- Gwyneth Jones: "The Tomb Wife" (Originally in F&SF, 2007)
- Marc Laidlaw: "An Evening's Honest Peril" (Originally in Flurb #3, 2007)
- Nancy Kress: "End Game" (Originally in Asimov's, 2007)
- Greg Egan: "Induction" (Originally in Foundation 100, 2007)
- Bernhard Ribbeck: "A Blue and Cloudless Sky" (Original English translation in The SFWA European Hall of Fame, 2007)
- Gregory Benford: "Reasons Not to Publish" (Originally in Nature, 2007)
- William Shunn: "Objective Impermeability in a Closed System" (Originally in An Alternate History of the 21st Century, 2007)
- Karen Joy Fowler: "Always" (Originally in Asimov's, 2007)
- Ken MacLeod: "Who's Afraid of Wolf 359?" (Originally in The New Space Opera, 2007)
- Tim Pratt: "Artifice and Intelligence" (Originally in Strange Horizons, 2007)
- Terry Bisson: "Pirates of the Somali Coast" (Originally in Subterranean 7, 2007)
- Ian McDonald: "Sanjeev and Robotwallah" (Originally in Fast Forward 1, 2007)
- Tony Ballantyne: "Third Person" (Originally in The Solaris Book of New Science Fiction, 2007)
- Kathleen Ann Goonan: "The Bridge" (Originally in Asimov's, 2007)
- John G. Hemry: "As You Know, Bob" (Originally in Analog, 2007)
- Bruce Sterling: "The Lustration" (Originally in Eclipse 1, 2007)
- James Van Pelt: "How Music Begins" (Originally in Asimov's, 2007)
