= Angels! =

Anthology series released in books

- Cover of first edition
- Editors: Jack Dann and Gardner Dozois
- Cover artist: Den Beauvais
- Language: English
- Series: Jack Dann and Gardner Dozois Ace anthology series
- Genre: Fantasy
- Publisher: Ace Books
- Publication date: 1995
- Publication place: United States
- Media type: Print (paperback)
- Pages: 225
- ISBN: 0-441-00220-X
- Preceded by: Horses!
- Followed by: Dinosaurs II

Angels! is a themed anthology of fantasy short works edited by Jack Dann and Gardner Dozois. It was first published in paperback by Ace Books in June 1995. It was reissued as an ebook by Baen Books in June 2013.

The book collects fourteen novelettes, short stories and poems by various authors.

== Contents ==
- "Basileus" (Robert Silverberg)
- "Angelica" (Jane Yolen)
- "Angels" (Bruce McAllister)
- "If Angels Ate Apples" (poem) (Geoffrey A. Landis)
- "Alfred" (Lisa Goldstein)
- "A Plethora of Angels" (Robert Sampson)
- "The Man Who Loved the Faioli" (Roger Zelazny)
- "Upon the Dull Earth" (Philip K. Dick)
- "Angel" (Pat Cadigan)
- "Curse of the Angel's Wife" (poem) (Bruce Boston)
- "Sleepers Awake" (Jamil Nasir)
- "And the Angels Sing" (Kate Wilhelm)
- "Grave Angels" (Richard Kearns)
- "All Vows" (Esther M. Friesner)
