= Year's Best SF 5 =

2000 anthology edited by David G. Hartwell

- Author: Edited by David G. Hartwell
- Cover artist: John Harris
- Language: English
- Series: Year's Best SF
- Genre: Science fiction
- Publisher: Eos
- Publication date: 2000
- Publication place: United States
- Media type: Print (paperback)
- Pages: 494 pp
- ISBN: 0-06-102054-0
- OCLC: 43785691
- Preceded by: Year's Best SF 4
- Followed by: Year's Best SF 6

Year's Best SF 5 is a science fiction anthology edited by David G. Hartwell that was published in 2000. It is the fifth in the Year's Best SF series.

== Contents ==
The book itself, as well as each of the stories, has a short introduction by the editor.

- Geoff Ryman: "Everywhere" (First published in Interzone, 1999)
- Elisabeth Malartre: "Evolution Never Sleeps" (First published in Asimov's, 1998)
- Kim Stanley Robinson: "Sexual Dimorphism" (First published in The Martians, 1999)
- Robert Reed: "Game of the Century" (First published in F&SF, 1999)
- Michael Bishop: "Secrets of the Alien Reliquary" (First published in Time Pieces, 1998)
- Sarah Zettel: "Kinds of Strangers" (First published in Analog, 1999)
- Cory Doctorow: "Visit the Sins" (First published in Asimov's, 1999)
- Greg Egan: "Border Guards" (First published in Interzone, 1999)
- Terry Bisson: "Macs" (First published in F&SF, 1999)
- Chris Lawson: "Written in Blood" (First published in Asimov's, 1999)
- Gene Wolfe: "Has Anybody Seen Junie Moon?" (First published in Moon Shots, 1999)
- Robert J. Sawyer: "The Blue Planet" (First published as "Mars Reacts!" in The Globe and Mail, 1999)
- Mary Soon Lee: "Lifework" (First published in Interzone, 1999)
- Fred Lerner: "Rosetta Stone" (First published in Artemis, 2000)
- Brian Aldiss: "An Apollo Asteroid" (First published in Moon Shots, 1999)
- Curt Wohleber: "100 Candles" (First published in Transversions, 1999)
- G. David Nordley: "Democritus' Violin" (First published in Analog, 1999)
- Tom Purdom: "Fossil Games" (First published in Asimov's, 1999)
- Chris Beckett: "Valour" (First published in Interzone, 1999)
- Stephen Baxter: "Huddle" (First published in F&SF, 1999)
- Brian M. Stableford: "Ashes and Tombstones" (First published in Moon Shots, 1999)
- Michael Swanwick: "Ancient Engines" (First published in Asimov's, 1999)
- Hiroe Suga: "Freckled Figure" (First published in Japanese in 1994, first English publication in Interzone, 1999)
- Barry N. Malzberg: "Shiva" (First published in Science Fiction Age, 1999)
- Lucy Sussex: "The Queen of Erewhon" (First published in F&SF, 1999)
