= Horses! =

1994 anthology edited by Jack Dann and Gardner Dozois

- Cover of first edition
- Editors: Jack Dann and Gardner Dozois
- Cover artist: Den Beauvais
- Language: English
- Series: Jack Dann and Gardner Dozois Ace anthology series
- Genre: Science fiction, fantasy
- Publisher: Ace Books
- Publication date: 1994
- Publication place: United States
- Media type: Print (paperback)
- Pages: 224
- ISBN: 0-441-00057-6
- Preceded by: Invaders!
- Followed by: Angels!

Horses! is a themed anthology of science fiction and fantasy short works edited by Jack Dann and Gardner Dozois. It was first published in paperback by Ace Books in May 1994. It was reissued as an ebook by Baen Books in July 2013.

The book collects twelve novelettes and short stories by various authors, with a bibliography by the editors.

== Contents ==
- "Classical Horses" (Judith Tarr)
- "The Wonder Horse" (George Byram)
- "On the Gem Planet" (Cordwainer Smith)
- "The Thunder of the Captains" (Garry Kilworth)
- "Brothers of the Wind" (Jane Yolen)
- "Aunt Millicent at the Races" (Len Guttridge)
- "The Circus Horse" (Amy Bechtel)
- "Riding the Nightmare" (Lisa Tuttle)
- "Wild, Wild Horses" (Howard Waldrop)
- "The Boy Who Plaited Manes" (Nancy Springer)
- "Horse Camp" (Ursula K. Le Guin)
- "His Coat So Gay" (Sterling E. Lanier)
- "Further Reading"
