= The Space Opera Renaissance =

2006 anthology edited by David G. Hartwell and Kathryn Cramer

First edition

The Space Opera Renaissance is an anthology of short science fiction that fits the definition of space opera: adventure stories of grand vision, where the majority of the action happens somewhere other than Earth. Meant to be an overview from the pulp fiction era to modern times, it is chronologically-organized and very thick (944 pages) but lacks representation by noted pioneers of the genre such as E. E. "Doc" Smith, Jack Vance and Alfred Bester, focusing more on the next wave. It was edited by David G. Hartwell and Kathryn Cramer. A hardcover edition was published by Tor Books in July 2006 and a trade paperback edition in July 2007.

== Contents ==
I. Redefined Writers

- "The Star Stealers" by Edmond Hamilton
- "The Prince of Space" by Jack Williamson
- "Enchantress of Venus" by Leigh Brackett
- "The Swordsman of Varnis" by Clive Jackson

II. Draftees (1960s)

- "The Game of Rat & Dragon" by Cordwainer Smith
- "Empire Star" by Samuel R. Delany
- "Zirn Left Unguarded, the Jenjik Palace in Flames, Jon Westerly Dead" by Robert Sheckley

III. Transitions/Redefiners (late 1970s to late 1980s)

- "Temptation" by David Brin
- "Ranks of Bronze" by David Drake
- "Weatherman" by Lois McMaster Bujold
- "A Gift from the Culture" by Iain M. Banks

IV. Volunteers: Revisionaries (early 90s)

- "Orphans of the Helix" by Dan Simmons
- "The Well Wishers" by Colin Greenland
- "Escape Route" by Peter Hamilton
- "Ms Midshipwoman Harrington" by David Weber
- "Aurora in Four Voices" by Catherine Asaro
- "Ring Rats" by R. Garcia y Robertson
- "The Death of Captain Future" by Allen Steele

V. Mixed Signals/ Mixed Categories (to the late 1990s)

- "A Worm in the Well" by Gregory Benford
- "The Survivor" by Donald Kingsbury
- "Fools Errand" by Sarah Zettel
- "The Shobies Story" by Ursula K. Le Guin
- "The Remoras" by Robert Reed (author)
- "Recording Angel" by Paul McAuley
- "The Great Game" by Steven Baxter
- "Lost Sorceress of the Silent Citadel" by Michael Moorcock
- "Space Opera" by Michael Kandel

VI. Next Wave/21st Century

- "Grist" by Tony Daniel
- "The Movements of her Eyes" by Scott Westerfeld
- "Spirey and the Queen" by Alastair Reynolds
- "Bear Trap" by Charles Stross
- "Guest Law" by John C. Wright
