= Year's Best SF =

Science fiction anthology series

Year's Best SF was a science fiction anthology series edited by David G. Hartwell and Kathryn Cramer. Hartwell started the series in 1996, and co-edited it with Cramer from 2002 until the final volume in 2013. It was published by HarperCollins under the Eos imprint. The creators of the books are not involved with the similarly titled Year's Best Science Fiction series.

Cramer and Hartwell also edited an annual collection of the Year's Best Fantasy.

== Volumes ==
- Year's Best SF 1 (1996)
- Year's Best SF 2 (1997)
- Year's Best SF 3 (1998)
- Year's Best SF 4 (1999)
- Year's Best SF 5 (2000)
- Year's Best SF 6 (2001)
- Year's Best SF 7 (2002)
- Year's Best SF 8 (2003)
- Year's Best SF 9 (2004)
- Year's Best SF 10 (2005)
- Year's Best SF 11 (2006)
- Year's Best SF 12 (2007)
- Year's Best SF 13 (2008)
- Year's Best SF 14 (2009)
- Year's Best SF 15 (2010)
- Year's Best SF 16 (2011)
- Year's Best SF 17 (2012)
- Year's Best SF 18 (2013)
