= Year's Best SF 3 =

1998 anthology edited by David G. Hartwell

- Author: Edited by David G. Hartwell
- Cover artist: Bob Eggleton
- Language: English
- Series: Year's Best SF
- Genre: Science fiction
- Publisher: HarperPrism
- Publication date: 1998
- Publication place: United States
- Media type: Print (paperback)
- Pages: 448 pp
- ISBN: 0-06-105901-3
- OCLC: 39258021
- Preceded by: Year's Best SF 2
- Followed by: Year's Best SF 4

Year's Best SF 3 is a science fiction anthology, edited by David G. Hartwell, that was published in 1998. It is the third in the Year's Best SF series.

== Contents ==
The book itself, as well as each of the stories, has a short introduction by the editor.

- Gene Wolfe: "Petting Zoo" (First published in Dinosaur Fantastic II, 1997)
- Michael Swanwick: "The Wisdom of Old Earth" (First published in Asimov's, 1997)
- Jack Williamson: "The Firefly Tree" (First published in Science Fiction Age, 1997)
- William Gibson: "Thirteen Views of a Cardboard City" (First published in New Worlds, 1996)
- S. N. Dyer: "The Nostalginauts" (First published in Asimov's, 1996)
- John C. Wright: "Guest Law" (First published in Asimov's, 1997)
- Gregory Benford: "The Voice" (First published in Science Fiction Age, 1997)
- Greg Egan: "Yeyuka" (First published in Meanjin, 1997)
- Terry Bisson: "An Office Romance" (First published in Playboy, 1997)
- James Patrick Kelly: "Itsy Bitsy Spider" (First published in Asimov's, 1997)
- Robert Silverberg: "Beauty in the Night" (First published in Science Fiction Age, 1997)
- Ray Bradbury: "Mr. Pale" (First published in Driving Blind, 1997)
- Brian Stableford: "The Pipes of Pan" (First published in F&SF, 1997)
- Nancy Kress: "Always True to Thee, in My Fashion" (First published in Asimov's, 1997)
- Tom Purdom: "Canary Land" (First published in Asimov's, 1997)
- Tom Cool: "Universal Emulators" (First published in F&SF, 1997)
- R. Garcia y Robertson: "Fair Verona" (First published in Asimov's, 1997)
- Kim Newman: "Great Western" (First published in New Worlds, 1997)
- Geoffrey A. Landis: "Turnover" (First published in Interzone, 1998)
- Paul Levinson: "The Mendelian Lamp Case" (First published in Analog, 1997)
- Katherine MacLean: "Kiss Me" (First published in Analog, 1997)
- Michael Moorcock: "London Bone" (First published in New Worlds, 1997)
