= What's Expected of Us =

- Short story by Ted Chiang
- Language: English
- Genre: Science fiction

Publication
- Published in: Nature
- Publication type: Magazine
- Publication date: 6 July 2005

"What's Expected of Us" is a science fiction short story by American writer Ted Chiang, initially published on 6 July 2005 by Nature. The story was also included in the 2006 anthology Year's Best SF 11 and in the 2019 collection Exhalation: Stories.

== Plot summary ==
A small device, the Predictor, looks like a remote control. It consists of a button and a big green LED. When the button is pressed, the light flashes. However, it flashes a second before the button is pressed — by receiving a signal a second from the future. Millions of these devices have been sold. The Predictors create a dystopic world by providing evidence that free will is actually a myth — the future is predetermined and fixed. This leads many people to become lethargic and stop eating entirely, with some developing Akinetic mutism, i.e. ceasing to move and speak entirely due to a loss of motivation. The text is finally revealed to be a message transmitted from the future to a time before the introduction of the Predictor. The narrator hopes to warn the reader, urging them to pretend that free will exists.

== See also ==
- Free will and determinism
- Free will theorem
- Locus of control
- Problem of mental causation
