= Year's Best SF 4 =

1999 anthology edited by David G. Hartwell

- Author: Edited by David G. Hartwell
- Cover artist: John Harris
- Language: English
- Series: Year's Best SF
- Genre: Science fiction
- Publisher: HarperPrism
- Publication date: 1999
- Publication place: United States
- Media type: Print (paperback)
- Pages: 484 pp
- ISBN: 0-06-105902-1
- OCLC: 41280414
- Preceded by: Year's Best SF 3
- Followed by: Year's Best SF 5

Year's Best SF 4 is a science fiction anthology, edited by David G. Hartwell, that was published in 1999. It is the fourth in the Year's Best SF series.

== Contents ==
The book itself, as well as each of the stories, has a short introduction by the editor.

- Alexander Jablokov: "Market Report" (First published in Asimov's Science Fiction, 1998)
- Gregory Benford: "A Dance to Strange Musics" (First published in Science Fiction Age, 1998)
- Norman Spinrad: "The Year of the Mouse" (First published in Asimov's, 1998)
- Mary Soon Lee: "The Day Before They Came" (First published in Interzone, 1998)
- Rob Chilson: "This Side of Independence" (First published in The Magazine of Fantasy & Science Fiction (F&SF), 1998)
- Stephen Baxter: "The Twelfth Album" (First published in Interzone, 1998)
- Ted Chiang: "Story of Your Life" (First published in Starlight 2, 1998)
- Robert Reed: "Whiptail" (First published in Asimov's, 1998)
- Mary Rosenblum: "The Eye of God" (First published in Asimov's, 1998)
- Michael F. Flynn: "Rules of Engagement" (First published in Analog, 1998)
- Michael Swanwick: "Radiant Doors" (First published in Asimov's, 1998)
- Jean-Claude Dunyach: "Unraveling the Thread" (First published in Galaxies #4 (French magazine) as "Déchiffrer la Trame," 1997)
- Dominic Green: "That Thing Over There" (First published in Interzone, 1998)
- Mark S. Geston: "The Allies" (First published in F&SF, 1998)
- Ron Goulart: "My Pal Clunky" (First published in Analog, 1998)
- David Brin: "Life in the Extreme" (First published in Popular Science, 1998)
- Michael Skeet: "Near Enough to Home" (First published in Arrowdreams, 1998)
- David Langford: "A Game of Consequences" (First published in Starlight 2, 1998)
- Nancy Kress: "State of Nature" (First published in Bending the Landscape: Science Fiction, 1998)
- Bruce Sterling: "Maneki Neko" (First published in F&SF, 1998)
