= The Ascent of Wonder: The Evolution of Hard SF =

1994 anthology of short stories compiled by David G. Hartwell and Kathryn Cramer

- Cover of paperback edition.
- Author: Edited by David G. Hartwell and Kathryn Cramer
- Language: English
- Genre: Science fiction anthology
- Publisher: Tor
- Publication date: 1994
- Publication place: United States
- Media type: Hardcover and paperback
- Pages: 990 pp
- ISBN: 0-312-85509-5
- OCLC: 299205098
- Followed by: The Hard SF Renaissance

The Ascent of Wonder: The Evolution of Hard SF is a definitive 1994 anthology of hard science fiction (sf) short stories compiled by the award-winning editing team of David G. Hartwell and Kathryn Cramer. This 990-page book includes 68 stories, each prefaced by a brief note to describe facts about the author, related works, or the logic of the story's inclusion in the genre. In addition, the book opens with three essays about the meaning and the boundaries of hard science fiction. The editors further explored these issues in The Hard SF Renaissance (2002).

== Contents ==
- "Real Science, Imaginary Worlds" by Gregory Benford. This essay discusses diverse connections between hard science fiction and science fact, and with scientists, extremes of scale, postmodernism, fantasy, as well as others. Citing numerous hard SF works, he illuminates the type of far-ranging notions that can be explored while still operating within a reasonably believable framework. Benford points out that similar to the endeavor of science, hard SF authors tend to share ideas and build immense discussions over time with newer works developing concepts further upon those that came before.
- "On Science and Science Fiction" by Kathryn Cramer
- "Hard Science Fiction" by David G. Hartwell

Author	Story Title	Year of first publication
Part I		
Ursula K. Le Guin	"Nine Lives"	1969
Bob Shaw	"Light of Other Days"	1966
Nathaniel Hawthorne	"Rappaccini's Daughter"	1844
Arthur C. Clarke	"The Star"	1955
Hal Clement	"Proof"	1942
Robert A. Heinlein	"It's Great to Be Back!"	1947
Gene Wolfe	"Procreation"	1984
Henry Kuttner and C.L. Moore	"Mimsy Were the Borogoves"	1943
Raymond Z. Gallun	"Davy Jones' Ambassador"	1935
Isaac Asimov	"The Life and Times of Multivac"	1975
Robert L. Forward	"The Singing Diamond"	1979
Dean Ing	"Down & Out on Ellfive Prime"	1979
Hilbert Schenck	"Send Me a Kiss by Wire"	1984
Philip Latham	"The Xi Effect"	1950
Edgar Allan Poe	"A Descent into the Maelström"	1841
Gregory Benford	"Exposures"	1982
Kate Wilhelm	"The Planners"	1968
James Blish	"Beep"	1954
Richard Grant	"Drode's Equations"	1981
Theodore L. Thomas	"The Weather Man"	1962
Part II		
Arthur C. Clarke	"Transit of Earth"	1971
J. G. Ballard	"Prima Belladonna"	1971
Donald M. Kingsbury	"To Bring in the Steel"	1978
C.M. Kornbluth	"Gomez"	1954
Isaac Asimov	"Waterclap"	1970
Anne McCaffrey	"Weyr Search"	1967
Rudy Rucker	"Message Found in a Copy of Flatland"	1983
Tom Godwin	"The Cold Equations"	1954
H.G. Wells	"The Land Ironclads"	1903
Larry Niven	"The Hole Man"	1973
John W. Campbell	"Atomic Power"	1934
John T. Sladek	"Stop Evolution in Its Tracks!"	1988
Miles J. Breuer, M.D.	"The Hungry Guinea Pig"	1930
Ian Watson	"The Very Slow Time Machine"	1978
Bruce Sterling	"The Beautiful and the Sublime"	1986
Ursula K. Le Guin	"The Author of the Acacia Seeds"	1974
John M. Ford	"Heat of Fusion"	1984
Gordon R. Dickson	"Dolphin's Way"	1964
Gene Wolfe	"All the Hues of Hell"	1987
Theodore Sturgeon	"Occam's Scalpel"	1971
Edward Bryant	"giANTS"	1979
Randall Garrett	"Time Fuse"	1954
Clifford D. Simak	"Desertion"	1944
Part III		
Poul Anderson	"Kyrie"	1969
Raymond F. Jones	"The Person from Porlock"	1947
Frederik Pohl	"Day Million"	1966
J. G. Ballard	"Cage of Sand"	1963
James Tiptree, Jr.	"The Psychologist Who Wouldn't Do Awful Things to Rats"	1976
Jules Verne	'In the Year 2889"	1889
James Blish	"Surface Tension"	1952
Cordwainer Smith	"No, No, Not Rogov!"	1959
George Turner	"In a Petri Dish Upstairs"	1978
Rudyard Kipling	"With the Night Mail"	1905
Arthur C. Clarke	"The Longest Science Fiction Story Ever Told"	1965
Alfred Bester	"The Pi Man"	1959
Gregory Benford	"Relativistic Effects"	1982
James P. Hogan	"Making Light"	1981
Isaac Asimov	"The Last Question"	1956
Philip K. Dick	"The Indefatigable Frog"	1953
John M. Ford	"Chromatic Aberration"	1994
Katherine Maclean	"The Snowball Effect"	1952
Hilbert Schenck	"The Morphology of the Kirkham Wreck"	1978
Greg Bear	"Tangents"	1986
William Gibson	"Johnny Mnemonic"	1981
David Brin	"What Continues, What Fails..."	1991
Michael F. Flynn	"Mammy Morgan Played the Organ; Her Daddy Beat the Drum"	1990
Vernor Vinge	"Bookworm, Run!"	1966

== Reception ==
Alex Anderson wrote in a positive review that Hartwell and Cramer have avoided the problems "behind the failure of the various other [previous] collections ... that have attempted to quantify the genre. These publications all failed for the same reason: omission. ... But not here. Here you'll find Gibson, Asimov, Clarke, Heinlein, Wells, Bear, Dick, Clement, Simak, Poe, Niven, Ballard and, yes, Blish. All the greats, and more. Sixty-nine names that are worth reading, and worth knowing."

Brian Attebery praised the volume as "a substantial (huge, actually) collection of classic and contemporary sf" and analyzes the introductions as well as the stories. Of the essays, he writes, "Yet at the same time the editors are valorizing hard sf, they are also planting doubts." On the one hand, hard science fiction produces pleasure and wonder and, as Cramer writes, it is "the core and center of the sf field," and Hartwell claims that it is "'about the emotional experience of describing and confronting what is scientifically true,' or more concisely, 'the Eureka.'" On the other, "It is this focus on what the editors frequently refer to as the 'hard sf affect' that allows them to pay lip service to conventional formulations of the hard/soft division while dramatically reconstructing our sense of the subgenre." Attebery finds, reading the stories, both "'soft' qualities as characterization, irony, and eloquence" and that a "'harder' underlying design emerges, something about the way technology reinvents human nature." Attebery identifies stories with "the pioneer mythos" and "an impatience with social systems [which] runs through virtually all of the stories in the book." Overall, Attebery writes,

One of the effects of this collection is to reveal similarities where many have claimed differences; that is, it makes Cordwainer Smith and Gene Wolfe seem to be part of the same enterprise as Hal Clement and Greg Bear. At the same time, however, other divisions begin to become evident ... between those who treat the Eureka as a mere emotional payoff and those who subject it to the kind of examination fiction traditionally gives to such things as character and morality. ... The editors' preference is indicated by the scarcity of pure Eureka stories as opposed to those in which the hard sf affect is questioned, ironized, or outright subverted. I count a dozen or so of the former, over fifty of the latter. Some of the most interesting stories manage to affirm even while they question.

Brian Stableford would find disagreement with the review by Anderson, for he finds significant omissions and he quarrels with some inclusions. After comparing the volume with Groff Conklin's The Best of Science Fiction (1946) and Attebery's and Ursula K. Le Guin's The Norton Book of Science Fiction (1993) ("there is a definite continuity of enterprise"), Stableford wonders why Hawthorne would be presented as a proto-hard-sf writer,

while J. G. Ballard, Gene Wolfe and John M. Ford all become hard sf writers of such significance that they warrant double inclusion (unlike the singly-represented Hal Clement, Larry Niven, and Poul Anderson or the unrepresented Charles Sheffield). Anne McCaffrey's "Weyr Search" is included on the ground that "intentions count"—in frank defiance of the philosophy of science, which opines that what really counts is how things check out—while Katherine MacLean's "The Snowball Effect" is included on the grounds that it allegedly treats sociology "as if" it were a hard science.
The mere passing mention of mathematical or philosophical notions is sufficient, in these editors' eyes, to qualify a story as hard sf... Jokes at the expense of science, or even at the expense of sf, also qualify...

Gary K. Wolfe did praise the anthology as "very readable" and thinks that as "both a reading and a teaching anthology," this book is preferable to the Norton anthology. "Those who believe that hard sf can be defined historically by the period of John W. Campbell, Jr.'s editorship of Astounding will find that Ascent of Wonder contains a pretty good selection of classically Campbell-era stories and authors ... of the sort you would expect in an anthology of this scope."

Like Attebery and Stableford, Wolfe thought the subtitle misleading ("With all the special exceptions and counter-examples, the book's argument is less a theory of sf 'evolution' than a kind of literary creationism") and likely to leave readers new to science fiction feeling unsure what, precisely, hard science fiction is. He wrote that the volume might "confuse the issue more than it clarifies it. ... Most sf readers are likely to come away, as I did, convinced more than ever that hard sf is a fuzzy set—but that it's not this fuzzy." Wolfe finds the story introductions to "sometimes seem directed toward the general reader, sometimes toward the aficionado, and sometimes toward no one at all," which "is almost certain to leave the non-fan feeling like an outsider." He objects to some inclusions (Flynn's is "a ghost story, for heaven's sake!" and Sturgeon's is "arguably not even an sf story") as well as to some themes and modes (Sladek's parody, Tiptree's fantasy). He concludes,

The pleasures of reading hard sf, to be sure, are much in evidence in The Ascent of Wonder, and most of my quibbles come directly from the book's ambitious and misleading subtitle. ... And certainly the arguments likely to be engendered by the book's odder selections may help to enliven critical debate.

David N. Samuelson shared reservations, too, judging that "this collection of stories is disorderly and diffuse, trying to serve not only the announced purpose, but others as well, among them a history lesson, a pleading for literary quality which may imply terms antithetical to sf "hardness," and a questioning of the very bases outlined in the introductions that supposedly constitute the subject at hand. Superficially laissez-faire, allowing room for each claimant to hard sf status, its scatter-shot methods of selection and presentation in fact deprecate the real thing, watering it down so much as to virtually destroy any generic consistency." He observed, "Scientists as major characters are not common," that scientists "as victims appear more often," and that the "hard sf 'affect' may be evinced by an authoritative quasi-documentary tone and a hefty dose of didacticism (often turned against science in these stories). Sometimes, however, the 'hard man against the universe' pose is confused with the hardheaded intellectual honesty and accuracy science demands." Like Wolfe, he thought the story introductions problematic: "some suffer from vapidity, others dip into specialized literary jargon." Samuelson concludes,

Several stories show little pretense that science provides any positive attitudinal bearings at all... Neither editorial commentary nor the apparently random sequence of stories helps readers understand what different gradations of "hardness" such departures may represent. Hartwell and Cramer may have no use for distinctions between extrapolation, speculation, and transformation as progressively distancing devices, but something is needed to show their awareness that Clement, Benford and Anderson actually write hard sf, unlike Grant, Hogan, and McCaffrey. Without such distinctions, the editors seem to have sold out the very premises on which they say they wanted to please both the hard sf constituency and that of the curious neophytes. ...
Ballard, Ford, Le Guin, Schenk and Wolfe would be over-represented once, as Bester, Bryant, Dick, Jones, McCaffrey, Simak and Tiptree actually are, in terms of their value to hard sf. The fact that they fit (when they do) the fall-back position of showing different ways science may function in sf is a weak justification. Hartwell's lame rhetorical ploy, that these texts are "in dialogue with" hard sf, might apply to every story with the slightest pretension to be sf. The presence of these authors in such numbers is itself an indication that this book honors the "hard sf" appellation more in the breach than in the observance.

Thomas Easton of Analog Science Fiction and Fact gave a rave review: "If I had received this book for Christmas when I was fifteen, I would have vanished from all human ken for a month, unless I surfaced periodically to scream my delight at the world. I am confident that it would have a similar effect on modern youngsters, so rush out and buy six copies ... And insist that your town and school libraries buy copies, for without this book they can no longer claim an adequate ability to introduce young or old readers to SF. This one is essential."

== See also ==
- Hard science
- Hard science fiction
- Soft science fiction
- Hard fantasy
