= Year's Best SF (Book 1) =

1996 anthology edited by David G. Hartwell

- Cover of paperback edition
- Author: Edited by David G. Hartwell
- Cover artist: Bob Eggleton
- Language: English
- Series: Year's Best SF
- Genre: Science fiction
- Published: 1996 (HarperPrism)
- Publication place: United States
- Media type: Print (hardback & paperback)
- Pages: 479 pp
- ISBN: 0-06-105641-3
- OCLC: 34627174
- Followed by: Year's Best SF 2

Year's Best SF is a science fiction anthology edited by David G. Hartwell that was published in 1996. It is the first in the Year's Best SF series, which was published every year until 2013.

As a "Best Of" anthology, all the stories in this book previously appeared either in science fiction magazines, original short fiction collections, or online publications. Its importance lies in that it, and the competing Year's Best Science Fiction anthology, are representative of the best short science fiction of the year.

== Contents ==
The book itself, as well as each of the stories, has a short introduction by the editor.

- James Patrick Kelly: "Think Like a Dinosaur" (Originally in Asimov's, 1995)
- Patricia A. McKillip: "Wonders of the Invisible World" (Originally in Full Spectrum 5, 1995)
- Robert Silverberg: "Hot Times in Magma City" (Originally in Omni Online, 1995)
- Stephen Baxter: "Gossamer" (Originally in Science Fiction Age, 1995)
- Gregory Benford: "A Worm in the Well" (Originally in Analog, 1995)
- William Browning Spencer: "Downloading Midnight" (Originally in Tomorrow, 1995)
- Joe Haldeman: "For White Hill" (Originally in Far Futures, 1995)
- William Barton: "In Saturn Time" (Originally in Amazing Stories: The Anthology, 1995)
- Ursula K. Le Guin: "Coming of Age in Karhide" (Originally in New Legends, 1995)
- Roger Zelazny: "The Three Descents of Jeremy Baker" (Originally in F&SF, 1995)
- Nancy Kress: "Evolution" (Originally in Asimov's, 1995)
- Robert Sheckley: "The Day the Aliens Came" (Originally in New Legends, 1995)
- Joan Slonczewski: "Microbe" (Originally in Analog, 1995)
- Gene Wolfe: "The Ziggurat" (Originally in Full Spectrum 5, 1995)
