= Alternate Americas =

1992 anthology edited by Gregory Benford and Martin H. Greenberg

- Cover of first edition
- Editors: Gregory Benford; Martin H. Greenberg
- Cover artist: Gary Ruddell
- Language: English
- Series: What Might Have Been
- Genre: Science fiction
- Publisher: Bantam Spectra
- Publication date: October 1992
- Publication place: United States
- Media type: Print (paperback)
- Pages: ix, 304 pp.
- ISBN: 0-553-29007-X
- Preceded by: Alternate Wars

Alternate Americas is an anthology of alternate history science fiction short stories edited by Gregory Benford and Martin H. Greenberg as the fourth volume in their What Might Have Been series. It was first published in paperback by Bantam Spectra in October 1992. It was later gathered together with Alternate Wars into the omnibus anthology What Might Have Been: Volumes 3 & 4: Alternate Wars / Alternate Americas (Bantam Spectra/SFBC, December 1992).

The book collects fourteen novellas, novelettes and short stories by various science fiction authors, with an introduction by Benford.

== Contents ==
- "Introduction" (Gregory Benford)
- "Report of the Special Committee on the Quality of Life" (Harry Turtledove)
- "Ink from the New Moon" (A. A. Attanasio)
- "Vinland the Dream" (Kim Stanley Robinson)
- "If There Be Cause" (Sheila Finch)
- "Isabella of Castile Answers Her Mail" (James Morrow)
- "Let Time Shape" (George Zebrowski)
- "Red Alert" (Jerry Oltion)
- "Such a Deal" (Esther M. Friesner)
- "Looking for the Fountain" (Robert Silverberg)
- "The Round-Eyed Barbarians" (L. Sprague de Camp)
- "Destination Indies" (Brad Linaweaver)
- "Ship Full of Jews" (Barry N. Malzberg)
- "The Karamazov Caper" (Gordon Eklund)
- "The Sleeping Serpent" (Pamela Sargent)
