= Year's Best SF 9 =

2004 anthology edited by David G. Hartwell and Kathryn Cramer

- Author: Edited by David G. Hartwell and Kathryn Cramer
- Cover artist: Gregory Bridges
- Language: English
- Series: Year's Best SF
- Genre: Science fiction
- Publisher: Eos
- Publication date: 2004
- Publication place: United States
- Media type: Print (paperback)
- Pages: 500 pp
- ISBN: 0-06-057559-X
- OCLC: 55641287
- LC Class: CPB Box no. 2273 vol. 8
- Preceded by: Year's Best SF 8
- Followed by: Year's Best SF 10

Year's Best SF 9 is a science fiction anthology edited by David G. Hartwell and Kathryn Cramer that was published in 2004. It is the ninth in the Year's Best SF series.

== Contents ==
The book itself, as well as each of the stories, has a short introduction by the editors.

- Octavia E. Butler: "Amnesty" (Originally in Sci Fiction, 2003)
- Geoff Ryman: "Birth Days" (Originally in Interzone, 2003)
- Tony Ballantyne: "The Waters of Meribah" (Originally in Interzone, 2003)
- Nancy Kress: "Ej-Es" (Originally in Stars: Original Stories Based on the Songs of Janis Ian, 2003)
- Joe Haldeman: "Four Short Novels" (Originally in F&SF, 2003)
- Charles Stross: "Rogue Farm" (Originally in Live Without a Net, 2003)
- Angélica Gorodischer: "The Violet's Embryos" (Originally in Cosmos Latinos, 2003)
- Michael Swanwick: "Coyote at the End of History" (Originally in Asimov's, 2003)
- John Varley: "In Fading Suns and Dying Moons" (Originally in Stars: Original Stories Based on the Songs of Janis Ian, 2003)
- Gene Wolfe: "Castaway" (Originally in Sci Fiction, 2003)
- Gregory Benford: "The Hydrogen Wall" (Originally in Asimov's, 2003)
- Ricard de la Casa and Pedro Jorge Romero: "The Day We Went Through the Transition" (Originally in Cosmos Latinos, 2003)
- Cory Doctorow: "Nimby and the Dimension Hoppers" (Originally in Asimov's, 2003)
- Robert Reed: "Night of Time" (Originally in The Silver Gryphon, 2003)
- Kage Baker: "A Night on the Barbary Coast" (Originally in The Silver Gryphon, 2003)
- Nigel Brown: "Annuity Clinic" (Originally in Interzone, 2003)
- Allen M. Steele: "The Madwoman of Shuttlefield" (Originally in Asimov's, 2003)
- M. Rickert: "Bread and Bombs" (Originally in F&SF, 2003)
- Stephen Baxter: "The Great Game" (Originally in Asimov's, 2003)
- Rick Moody: "The Albertine Notes" (Originally in McSweeney's Mammoth Treasury of Thrilling Tales, 2003)
