= Year's Best SF 6 =

2001 anthology edited by David G. Hartwell

- Author: Edited by David G. Hartwell
- Cover artist: Paul Youll
- Language: English
- Series: Year's Best SF
- Genre: Science fiction
- Publisher: Eos
- Publication date: 2001
- Publication place: United States
- Media type: Print (paperback)
- Pages: 500 pp
- ISBN: 0-06-102055-9
- OCLC: 47143674
- Preceded by: Year's Best SF 5
- Followed by: Year's Best SF 7

Year's Best SF 6 is a science fiction anthology edited by David G. Hartwell that was published in 2001. It is the sixth in the Year's Best SF series.

== Contents ==
The book itself, as well as each of the stories, has a short introduction by the editor.

- Paul J. McAuley: "Reef" (First published in Skylife: Space Habitats in Story and Science, 2000)
- David Brin: "Reality Check" (First published in Nature, 2000)
- Robert Silverberg: "The Millennium Express" (First published in Playboy, 2000)
- Tananarive Due: "Patient Zero" (First published in F&SF, 2000)
- Ken MacLeod: "The Oort Cloud" (First published in Nature, 2000)
- M. Shayne Bell: "The Thing About Benny" (First published in Vanishing Acts, 2000)
- Brian Stableford: "The Last Supper" (First published in Science Fiction Age, 2000)
- Joan Slonczewski: "Tuberculosis Bacteria Join UN" (First published in Nature, 2000)
- Howard Waldrop: "Our Mortal Span" (First published in Black Heart, Ivory Bones, 2000)
- David Langford: "Different Kinds of Darkness" (First published in F&SF, 2000)
- Norman Spinrad: "New Ice Age, or Just Cold Feet?" (First published in Nature, 2000)
- Stephen Dedman: "The Devotee" (First published in Eidolon (Australian magazine), 2000)
- Chris Beckett: "The Marriage of Sky and Sea" (First published in Interzone, 2000)
- John M. Ford: "In the Days of the Comet" (First published in Nature, 2000)
- Ursula K. Le Guin: "The Birthday of the World" (First published in F&SF, 2000)
- Greg Egan: "Oracle" (First published in Asimov's, 2000)
- Nancy Kress: "To Cuddle Amy" (First published in Asimov's, 2000)
- Brian W. Aldiss: "Steppenpferd" (First published in F&SF, 2000)
- Stephen Baxter: "Sheena 5" (First published in Analog, 2000)
- Darrell Schweitzer: "The Fire Eggs" (First published in Interzone, 2000)
- Robert Sheckley: "The New Horla" (First published in F&SF, 2000)
- Dan Simmons: "Madame Bovary, C'est Moi" (First published in Nature, 2000)
- Robert Reed: "Grandma's Jumpman" (First published in Century, 2000)
- Chris Dexter Ward: "Bordeaux Mixture" (First published in Nature, 2000)
- Robert Charles Wilson: "The Dryad's Wedding" (First published in Star Colonies, 2000)
- Michael F. Flynn: "Built Upon the Sands of Time" (First published in Analog, 2000)
- Ted Chiang: "Seventy-Two Letters" (First published in Vanishing Acts, 2000)
