= Alternate Wars =

1991 anthology of short stories edited by Gregory Benford and Martin H. Greenberg

- Cover of first edition
- Editors: Gregory Benford; Martin H. Greenberg
- Cover artist: Paul Swendsen
- Language: English
- Series: What Might Have Been
- Genre: Science fiction
- Publisher: Bantam Spectra
- Publication date: December 1991
- Publication place: United States
- Media type: Print (paperback)
- Pages: viii, 296 pp.
- ISBN: 0-553-29008-8
- Preceded by: Alternate Heroes
- Followed by: Alternate Americas

Alternate Wars is an anthology of alternate history science fiction short stories edited by Gregory Benford and Martin H. Greenberg as the third volume in their What Might Have Been series. It was first published in paperback by Bantam Spectra in December 1991. It was later gathered together with Alternate Americas into the omnibus anthology What Might Have Been: Volumes 3 & 4: Alternate Wars / Alternate Americas (Bantam Spectra/SFBC, December 1992).

The book collects twelve novellas, novelettes and short stories by various science fiction authors, with an introduction by Benford.

== Contents ==
- "Introduction" (Gregory Benford)
- "And Wild for to Hold" (Nancy Kress)
- "Tundra Moss" (F. M. Busby)
- "When Free Men Shall Stand" (Poul Anderson)
- "Arms and the Woman" (James Morrow)
- "Ready for the Fatherland" (Harry Turtledove)
- "The Tomb" (Jack McDevitt)
- "Turpentine" (Barry N. Malzberg)
- "Goddard's People" (Allen Steele)
- "Manassas, Again" (Gregory Benford)
- "The Number of the Sand" (George Zebrowski)
- "If Lee Had Not Won the Battle of Gettysburg" (Winston S. Churchill)
- "Over There" (Mike Resnick)
