= Year's Best SF 2 =

1997 anthology edited by David G. Hartwell

- Author: Edited by David G. Hartwell
- Cover artist: Bob Eggleton
- Language: English
- Series: Year's Best SF
- Genre: Science fiction
- Publisher: HarperPrism
- Publication date: 1997
- Publication place: United States
- Media type: Print (paperback)
- Pages: 441 pp
- ISBN: 0-06-105746-0
- OCLC: 36974228
- Preceded by: Year's Best SF
- Followed by: Year's Best SF 3

Year's Best SF 2 is a science fiction anthology edited by David G. Hartwell that was published in 1997. It is the second in the Year's Best SF series.

== Contents ==
The book itself, as well as each of the stories, has a short introduction by the editor.

- Dave Wolverton: "After a Lean Winter" (Originally in F&SF, 1996)
- Terry Bisson: "In the Upper Room" (Originally in Playboy, 1996)
- John Brunner: "Thinkertoy" (Originally in The Williamson Effect, 1996)
- Gregory Benford: "Zoomers" (Originally in Future Net, 1996)
- Sheila Finch: "Out of the Mouths" (Originally in F&SF, 1996)
- James Patrick Kelly: "Breakaway, Backdown" (Originally in Asimov's, 1996)
- Yves Meynard: "Tobacco Words" (Originally in Tomorrow, 1995)
- Joanna Russ: "Invasion" (Originally in Asimov's, 1996)
- Brian Stableford: "The House of Mourning" (Originally in Off Limits: Tales of Alien Sex, 1996)
- Damon Knight: "Life Edit" (Originally in Science Fiction Age, 1996)
- Robert Reed: "First Tuesday" (Originally in F&SF, 1996)
- David Langford: "The Spear of the Sun" (Originally in Interzone, 1996)
- Gene Wolfe: "Counting Cats in Zanzibar" (Originally in Asimov's, 1996)
- Bruce Sterling: "Bicycle Repairman" (Originally in Intersections: The Sycamore Hill Anthology, 1996)
- Gwyneth Jones: "Red Sonja and Lessingham in Dreamland" (Originally in Off Limits: Tales of Alien Sex, 1996)
- Allen Steele: "Doblin's Lecture" (Originally in Pirate Writings, 1996)
- Kathleen Ann Goonan: "The Bride of Elvis" (Originally in Science Fiction Age, 1996)
- Kate Wilhelm: "Forget Luck" (Originally in F&SF, 1996)
- Connie Willis: "Nonstop to Portales" (Originally in The Williamson Effect, 1996)
- Stephen Baxter: "Columbiad" (Originally in Science Fiction Age, 1996)
