= Murasaki (novel) =

1992 collaborative novel edited by Robert Silverberg

First edition (publ. Bantam Books Cover art by Stephen Youll)

Murasaki is a 1992 "shared universe" hard science fiction novel in six parts to which Poul Anderson, Greg Bear, Gregory Benford, David Brin, Nancy Kress and Frederik Pohl each contributed one chapter; it was edited by Robert Silverberg. It is the first anthology of this type to be entirely conceived and written by winners of the Nebula Award.

The scenery is set in a fictional double planet system in orbit around an actually existing red dwarf star (HD36395; also known as Gliese 205 and Wolf 1453), about 20 light years from the Solar System. Because the system had been first explored by a Japanese robot interstellar probe the star has been given the proper name Murasaki (after the famous Japanese writer, Murasaki Shikibu). The larger of the two planets is Genji, named after Hikaru Genji, the hero of her novel Genji Monogatari; the smaller one is named Chujo, after Genji's close friend Tō no Chūjō.

== Fictional physical characteristics of the Murasaki system ==
Poul Anderson, who had a degree in physics, worked out the physical framework for the anthology based on the characteristics of HD36395 as they were known in the early 1990s: one third of Earth Sun's mass, 82% of its diameter, spectral type M1 with a photosphere temperature of 3,400 K and a maximum emission in the near infrared. (The star is in fact very similar to Gliese 581, now known to have a planetary system.)

The twin terrestrial planets are separated by an average distance of only 156,000 km (about 40% of the Earth-Moon distance). They orbit around their center of mass in 91 hours in locked rotation, which minimizes the effects of the huge tidal forces which they exert on each other. This constellation orbits Murasaki within the habitable zone, at a distance of only 0.223 astronomical units (sidereal year, 66 Earth days) where the planets receive about the same amount of total irradiation Mars gets from the Sun; however, with a spectral power distribution shifted to much longer wavelengths. From this distance the star appears as a disk of 1° 40' diameter, almost three times as large as the Sun (or the Moon) when observed from Earth. Both planets have plate tectonics, causing most of their carbon dioxide to be bound in their crusts, and have oxygen-nitrogen atmospheres of Earth-like composition.

=== Genji ===
Genji is a Super-Earth but only moderately so: it has 2.8 times the mass and 1.36 times the diameter of Earth, and 1.5 times Earth's gravity. The side of the planet that constantly faces its companion world Chujo ("Moonside") is mostly land, the other hemisphere ("Starside") is mostly ocean. The mean surface temperature is +20 °C, slightly warmer than Earth. Although humans in good condition can physically accommodate to the high gravity, the sea level air pressure of 3.1 bars which results from this gravity (as per the barometric formula) requires artificial decompression for safe breathing. Only at 5,800 meters (an altitude found on this planet only in the form of a few small highlands that are cold and arid) does the atmospheric pressure drop to Earth-standard 1 bar.

=== Chujo ===
This is the smaller world, with 0.76 Earth masses at 94% of its diameter, and 85% of its surface gravity. The mean surface temperature is only +5 °C. Because most of this chilly planet's water is locked in permafrost and glaciers, the atmosphere (which has a sea-level pressure of 0.7 bar, equivalent to about 3,650 m altitude on Earth) is not only thin but also uncomfortably dry. From the hemisphere where the companion world Genji can be seen it hangs in the sky as a globe of 6° 20' diameter, and when full gives over 320 times the light of the full Moon as seen from Earth.

== Murasaki sapients ==
There are three sapient races in the system, the Ihrdizu and the himatids on Genji and the Chupchups on Chujo.

The Ihrdizu have evolved on Genji's moonside from an amphibian precursor, a fact which still shows in their poikilothermic regulation of body temperature. They are omnivorous quadrupeds with torpedo-shaped blue-gray, smooth-skinned bodies and a strong tail with two muscular horizontal flukes. Four telescoping eyes are spaced around the head behind the mouth, allowing for almost panoramic vision although the head cannot turn. Two slender tentacles, each terminating in three dextrous digits, grow from below the tympani on each side of the head. An adult female (the dominant gender; female exogamy is the rule) is about two meters long and masses about 100 kg; the adult male is smaller. The Ihrdizu societies are in a broad range of developmental stages from the quasi-paleolithic to the early industrialisation. Cities and wars in the human sense are unknown.

The hermaphroditic himatids (the name is derived from the Greek himation, a cloak) have evolved on Genji's predominantly oceanic starside. Their basic form is the ribbon or plate which takes in nourishment and oxygen on its lower (ventral) side, and excretes on the upper (dorsal) side. Their life cycle starts with caterpillar-sized "wrigglers" which swim ashore and adopt a slug-like existence, growing by addition of cell layers to become "tads." Once they have reached a size of about 40 x 10 cm and are too big to get around readily on land, they follow chemical clues to the tidelands where they join older juveniles, the "calves" which are fully intelligent, mostly aquatic, live in bands, and have a culture about which little is known (and even less understood) by human researchers or by the Ihrdizu which used to enslave them. Once the calves are too big for the rough tidal waters they swim to the open sea to become "carpet whales" which measure from 5 meters length upwards, and might live for millennia. This sexually mature final stage no longer uses tools, no longer hunts but grazes, and might either lose recognizable intelligence or spend its time with philosophy.

The outwardly humanoid sapients of Chujo, the Chupchups are mysterious as the story begins to unfold. Before their planet's climate changed to its present harsh conditions thousands of years ago they had reached a stage resembling the Hellenistic civilization on Earth. Their abandoned cities and some self-managing fields are still in evidence, but only about a million individuals organized in nomadic tribes remain. The Chupchups are clothed in a sort of living rag, in an ectosymbiosis with what is considered a remainder of their former civilization which must have had considerable biotechnology skills. They are literate and keep "libraries" which the tribes visit on a regular basis. Chupchups consistently ignore human researchers' every attempt at communication.

== Story plot ==
=== The Treasures of Chujo (by Frederik Pohl) ===
In 2265 C.E. the first human-crewed ship arrives in the Murasaki system after 11 shipboard years of time-dilated relativistic travel. It is actually a hull intended for transport between asteroid habitats in the human solar system which the Spacers have hastily fitted with an interstellar drive after having intercepted the signals from the Japanese robot probe that reported Earth-like planets and intelligent life at Murasaki. As the Japanese expedition force arrives much earlier than had been expected, the Spacers hastily break camp because the first Murasaki samples returned to the human solar system would be the economically most valuable. They leave behind Aaron Kammer, their drive engineer, who had separated from his exploration team on Chujo and is presumed dead.

=== World Vast, World Various (by Gregory Benford) ===
The much larger and more professional Japanese expedition systematically explores both planets but fails to establish communication with the Chupchups. As they attempt investigation one of their repositories they are attacked by the troll-like creatures who serve as bodyguards to the intelligent Chujoans. The ruins of the cities reveal mysterious wall paintings and engravings. One such effigy is later found to reflect reality: in the high mountain areas of Chujo, huge mat-like organisms lift off the rocks on excreted hydrogen and form "bioloons" in which several Chupchups attempt to leave the planet; all who try it die.

=== Genji (by David Brin) ===
The main base of the Japanese expedition is on Genji, where researchers establish good relations with the Ihrdizu civilization; machine translation between the languages is not perfect but sufficient for simple communication. As the sociology and history of the Ihrdizu are slowly uncovered, it is revealed that not all is as it seems; the race must have gone through many cycles of technological rise and fall; the invention of metallurgy and advance to the equivalent of an early industrial revolution must have occurred at least six or seven times. However, the Ihrdizu are completely unaware of this history. Life itself is at least as old as on Earth but more variegated; instead of ultraviolet radiation and impact events the more labile nature of the biomolecules (which contain several amino acids unknown on Earth) has acted as the driver of early evolution.

=== A Plague of Conscience (by Greg Bear) ===
Four years later, two more ships have arrived: a British-led multinational expedition, and a ragged vessel carrying about 200 members of the Quantist sect from the Southwestern United States. A plague caused by calcium-seeking Chujoan microorganisms has reduced their number to 20, including their leader Carnot who proselytizes among the Ihrdizu communities, preaching an adapted version of his teaching of "Jesus the Physicist" who will at one time reunite the sapients of Genji and Chujo. Integrated into this gospel is Kammer, who has been cured from his injuries by the Chupchups and was brought into a symbiosis with the mat-like organism. Tensions develop between the three groups of emissaries. Kammer, who is barely recognizable as a human being, is brought to Genji to meet Carnot. Both are killed by the Ihrdizu when Kammer goes berserk after realizing that the natives still hunt carpet whales.

=== Language (by Poul Anderson) ===
Rita Byrne is dispatched from Genji base station to seek out Malchiel Holden, a reclusive and somewhat sociopathic biologist who investigates the himatides, and has gained some understanding of their habits and body language. Holden accompanies a himatid calf to the open sea where it is supposed to meet with its elders, but runs into two Ihrdizu whaling ships which have harpooned a carpet whale. He sinks one of the vessels, and kills three natives as they try to board his ship. Byrne, who will later marry Holden, witnesses the slaughter from her flyer but is unable to prevent it. Holden defends his actions with an interpretation of Gödel's incompleteness theorems: to understand our own humanity we must study what is as radically different as possible. The Ihrdizu are much too similar to humans in their biology and mentality to serve this purpose.

=== Birthing Pool (by Nancy Kress) ===
The year is ca. 2295, almost fifteen years after the last episode. There are seven distinct groups of humans (most scientific, some religious) on the planets of the Murasaki system, but only four children have been born here during the past 30 years. Without apparent reason the carpet whales, who normally graze in the polar waters of Genji's Starside, start swimming towards Moonside, converging towards the point where Chujo is exactly overhead. The Holdens alert the other humans to the fact that the carpet whales are projecting an image of Kammer into the atmosphere. At the sub-Genji node on the sister planet, the huge living mats (now known to consist of microorganisms related to those that caused the plague) again form bioloons, but this time they transport Chupchups to Genji, guided by bioluminescent signals from the carpet whales. At the same time, all Ihrdizu interrupt whatever activity they are engaged in, and gain access to knowledge that was previously blocked. On Chujo, the aloof Chupchups suddenly seek contact with the humans and present records revealing that all these events are part of a genetically encoded cycle of evolution that knits together all three sapient races in the Murasaki system: the Chupchups bioengineer the Genjian ecology but every time they cause an environmental disaster which results in diebacks and in the breakdown of the Ihrdizu civilization; the carpet whales exile the Chupchups to Chujo so that they can improve their bioengineering, and call them back when the cycle can be started again. The Chupchups' attempt to return to Genji 28 years earlier failed because the Ihrdizu had killed so many carpet whales that no proper guiding signals could be produced.

== Significance of the anthology ==
=== Analysis ===
The anthology is an example of a shared world work taking place in a setting created specifically for that collaborative effort. It has been described as belonging to the subgenre of "exobiological science fiction", which deals with the concept of sociobiology.

Besides being a unique collaborative work of the world's foremost science fiction authors of the late 20th century, the Murasaki anthology tells several valuable lessons. First, it demonstrates how difficult it would be to find planets that could be truly colonized by humans. Genji and Chujo both are as terrestrial planets as one could reasonably expect to find, but the relatively minor deviations of their masses from Earth standard result in an atmospheric pressure gradient where unaided breathing is possible only at some places, even though the composition of gases is right for humans. Very few items from the alien biosphere can be safely eaten and/or provide nourishment. The intensity and spectral composition of the sunlight is wrong for humans. As a result, humans must bring their own food or produce it in artificial environments, and exposure to artificial earthly daylight is required to maintain physical and mental health. On Genji the gravity (although only half again as high as on Earth) is an inescapable factor that confers both acute and chronic physical risk, and appears to promote dysthymia. In summary this illustrates that even on the most Earth-like planets that might eventually be found, only outposts (but no actual colonies) will be feasible.

The second lesson is that the presence of such human outposts in the Murasaki system has been totally irrelevant to the pre-programmed local cycles of destruction and rebuilding. Neither the initial caution against biological and cultural contamination nor the subsequent missionary efforts among the Ihrdizu have had the slightest effect, simply because the ecosystems as well as the societies are just too alien to suffer or benefit from human actions short of mass slaughter.

=== Reception ===
Gerald Jonas in The New York Times Book Review has stated: "It is rare to find a shared-world anthology that adds up to more than the sum of its parts. "Murasaki" is a welcome exception ... For all their individual quirks of style and outlook, the contributions fit together like pieces of a puzzle, just as the ecological and evolutionary facts about Genji and Chujo fit together into a grand design that does not become apparent until the end of the book. Of such details are worlds, and stories, made." A review from Publishers Weekly stated that the book's stories "are linked and form a novel-like progression" compared to Medea, but critiqued the "little distinctions among their six chapters". While praising the individual stories as "solid and worthy", Kirkus criticised that the stories "fail to rise much above the average". Nevertheless, the review recommended the book for readers who liked Medea.

The "Murasaki Universe" has not been explored further after the original anthology had been published, although (as Robert Silverberg stated in his editorial) "even these six top-flight writers didn't begin to exhaust the background material."

== Publication data ==
- Murasaki. A novel in six parts. By Poul Anderson, Greg Bear, Gregory Benford, David Brin, Nancy Kress, and Fredrick Pohl. Edited by Robert Silverberg. Bantam Books, New York – Toronto – London -Sydney – Auckland. May 1992. ISBN 0-553-56187-1. Library of Congress Catalog No.: 91-39283.

== See also ==
- Extrasolar planet
- Extraterrestrials in fiction
- Gliese 581 d
- Habitability of red dwarf systems
- Interstellar travel
- Planetary habitability
