= Alternate Heroes =

1990 anthology edited by Gregory Benford and Martin H. Greenberg

- Cover of first edition
- Editors: Gregory Benford; Martin H. Greenberg
- Cover artist: Paul Swendsen
- Language: English
- Series: What Might Have Been
- Genre: Science fiction
- Publisher: Bantam Spectra
- Publication date: January 1990
- Publication place: United States
- Media type: Print (paperback)
- Pages: viii, 354 pp.
- ISBN: 0-553-28279-4
- Preceded by: Alternate Empires
- Followed by: Alternate Wars

Alternate Heroes is an anthology of alternate history science fiction short stories edited by Gregory Benford and Martin H. Greenberg as the second volume in their What Might Have Been series. It was first published in paperback by Bantam Spectra in January 1990, and in trade paperback by BP Books in June 2004. It was also gathered together with Alternate Empires into the omnibus anthology What Might Have Been: Volumes 1 & 2: Alternate Empires / Alternate Heroes (Bantam Spectra/SFBC, July 1990).

The book collects fourteen novellas, novelettes and short stories by various science fiction authors, with an introduction by Benford.

== Contents ==
- "Introduction" (Gregory Benford)
- "A Sleep and a Forgetting" (Robert Silverberg)
- "The Old Man and C" (Sheila Finch)
- "The Last Article" (Harry Turtledove)
- "Mules in Horses' Harness" (Michael Cassutt)
- "Lenin in Odessa" (George Zebrowski)
- "Abe Lincoln in McDonald's" (James Morrow)
- "Another Goddamned Showboat" (Barry N. Malzberg)
- "Loose Cannon" (Susan Shwartz)
- "A Letter from the Pope" (Harry Harrison and Tom Shippey)
- "Roncesvalles" (Judith Tarr)
- "His Powder'd Wig, His Crown of Thornes" (Marc Laidlaw)
- "Departures" (Harry Turtledove)
- "Instability" (Rudy Rucker and Paul Di Filippo)
- "No Spot of Ground" (Walter Jon Williams)
