= Year's Best SF 10 =

2005 anthology edited by David G. Hartwell and Kathryn Cramer

- Author: Edited by David G. Hartwell and Kathryn Cramer
- Cover artist: Fred Gambino
- Language: English
- Series: Year's Best SF
- Genre: Science fiction
- Published: 2005 (Eos)
- Publication place: United States
- Media type: Print (paperback)
- Pages: 498 pp
- ISBN: 0-06-057561-1
- OCLC: 60594112
- Preceded by: Year's Best SF 9
- Followed by: Year's Best SF 11

Year's Best SF 10 is a science fiction anthology edited by David G. Hartwell and Kathryn Cramer that was published in 2005. It is the tenth in the Year's Best SF series.

== Contents ==
The book itself, as well as each of the stories, has a short introduction by the editors.

- Bradley Denton: "Sergeant Chip" (Originally in F&SF, 2004)
- Gregory Benford: "First Commandment" (Originally in Sci Fiction, 2004)
- Glenn Grant: "Burning Day" (Originally in Island Dreams: Montreal Writers of the Fantastic, 2004)
- Terry Bisson: "Scout's Honor" (Originally in Sci Fiction, 2004)
- Pamela Sargent: "Venus Flowers at Night" (Originally in Microcosms, 2004)
- Gene Wolfe: "Pulp Cover" (Originally in Asimov's, 2004)
- Ken Liu: "The Algorithms for Love" (Originally in Strange Horizons, 2004)
- Ray Vukcevich: "Glinky" (Originally in F&SF, 2004)
- Janeen Webb: "Red City" (Originally in Synergy SF: New Science Fiction, 2004)
- Jack McDevitt: "Act of God" (Originally in Microcosms, 2004)
- Robert Reed: "Wealth" (Originally in Asimov's, 2004)
- Matthew Hughes: "Mastermindless" (Originally in F&SF, 2004)
- Jean-Claude Dunyach: "Time, as It Evaporates..." (Originally in The Night Orchid: Conan Doyle in Toulouse, 2004)
- James Stoddard: "The Battle of York" (Originally in F&SF, 2004)
- Liz Williams: "Loosestrife" (Originally in Interzone, 2004)
- James Patrick Kelly: "The Dark Side of Town" (Originally in Asimov's, 2004)
- Steven Utley: "Invisible Kingdom" (Originally in F&SF, 2004)
- Sean McMullen: "The Cascade" (Originally in Agog! Terrific Tales, 2004)
- Charles Coleman Finlay: "Pervert" (Originally in F&SF, 2004)
- Steve Tomasula: "The Risk-Taking Gene as Expressed by Some Asian Subjects" (Originally in Denver Quarterly, 2004)
- Neal Asher: "Strood" (Originally in Asimov's, 2004)
- James L. Cambias: "The Eckener Alternative" (Originally in All Star Zeppelin Adventure Stories, 2004)
- Brenda Cooper: "Savant Songs" (Originally in Analog, 2004)
