= The New York Review of Science Fiction =

- Discipline: Science fiction studies
- Language: English

Publication details
- History: 1988-present
- Publisher: Burrowing Wombat Press (United States)
- Frequency: Monthly

Standard abbreviations
- ISO 4: N. Y. Rev. Sci. Fict.

Indexing
- ISSN: 1052-9438
- OCLC no.: 21801115

Links
- Journal homepage

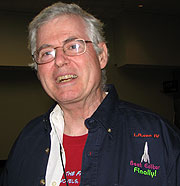
Hartwell in 2007

The New York Review of Science Fiction (colloquially known as NYRSF, pronounced NUR-siff) is a monthly literary magazine of science fiction that was established in 1988. It includes works of science fiction criticism, essays, and in-depth critical reviews of new works of fiction and scholarship. For the first 24 years, it was published by David G. Hartwell's Dragon Press, but with the start of volume 25, it has shifted to publisher Kevin J. Maroney's Burrowing Wombat Press.

The journal is indexed in the MLA International Bibliography and other subject-specific literature and cultural studies indexes. A complete and up-to-date index in Microsoft Excel format is available online.

Although international in coverage, the journal also sponsors SF events in the New York City area, principally including a series of readings from prominent writers that are generally broadcast on WBAI.

== History ==
The New York Review of Science Fiction was established in 1988 by Hartwell, Patrick Nielsen Hayden, Teresa Nielsen Hayden, Susan Palwick, Samuel R. Delany, and Kathryn Cramer. Gordon Van Gelder has also been on the editorial staff over the years. It was a print publication until the end of volume 24; now it is available electronically. Tables of contents, editorials, and some featured articles are offered for free online. For example, Delany's 1998 essay Racism and Science Fiction was often referenced during online debates about race and science fiction in early 2009 and in response to a subscriber request, the essay was posted online.

== See also ==
- Extrapolation
- Femspec
- Foundation – The International Review of Science Fiction
- The Internet Review of Science Fiction
- Mythlore
- Science Fiction Studies
