= Project Hieroglyph =

Writing project led by Neal Stephenson

Hieroglyph
- Available in: English
- Owner: Arizona State University
- Creators: Neal Stephenson (founder); Ed Finn (editor); Kathryn Cramer (editor)
- Website: hieroglyph.asu.edu
- Commercial: No
- Launched: 2012

Project Hieroglyph is an initiative to create science fiction in order to spur innovation in science and technology, founded by Neal Stephenson in 2011.

== Origins and purpose ==
Stephenson framed the ideas behind Hieroglyph in a World Policy Institute article entitled "Innovation Starvation" where he attempts to rally writers to infuse science fiction with optimism that could inspire a new generation to, as he puts it, “get big stuff done.”

Stephenson says that "a good SF universe has a coherence and internal logic that makes sense to scientists and engineers. Examples include Isaac Asimov's robots, Robert Heinlein's rocket ships, and William Gibson's cyberspace. Such icons serve as hieroglyphs—simple, recognizable symbols on whose significance everyone agrees."

Stephenson partnered with Arizona State University's Center for Science and the Imagination which now administers the project.

In September 2014, the project's first book, Hieroglyph: Stories and Visions for a Better Future, edited by Ed Finn and Kathryn Cramer, was published by William Morrow. Contributors to the book include Neal Stephenson, Bruce Sterling, Madeline Ashby, Gregory Benford, Rudy Rucker, Vandana Singh, Cory Doctorow, Elizabeth Bear, Karl Schroeder, James Cambias, Brenda Cooper, Charlie Jane Anders, Kathleen Ann Goonan, Lee Konstantinou, Annalee Newitz, Geoffrey Landis, David Brin, Lawrence Krauss, and Paul Davies.

== See also ==
- Collaborative innovation network
- Exploratory engineering
- Fictional technology
- Invention
- Macro-engineering
- Megaproject
- Megascale engineering
- The Mongoliad
- Retrofuturism
- Techno-progressivism
- Technological utopianism
