= Against Infinity =

1983 novel by Gregory Benford

Against Infinity is a science fiction novel by American writer Gregory Benford, published in 1983.

== Plot summary ==
It tells the story of a group of colonists who hunt for the tunneling Aleph during the terraforming of Ganymede.

== Reception ==
Dave Pringle reviewed Against Infinity for Imagine magazine, and stated that "Benford is tackling his favourite theme of Humanity confronting the Other. There is no theme more fundamental to science fiction."

Dave Langford reviewed the novel for White Dwarf #58, and stated that "This is an inconceivably alien quasi-machine, ever-changing, carefully not described in detail ('alabaster in parts and in other oozing an amber, watery light'): highly effective."

Colin Greenland reviewed Against Infinity for Imagine magazine, and stated that "The macho jaunt becomes thoroughly absorbing in the hands of Benford, who writes with equal attention to scientific plausibility and human emotion, and writes well."

== Reviews ==
- Review by Dan Chow (1983) in Locus, #267 April 1983
- Review by Bob Collins (1983) in Fantasy Newsletter, #59 May 1983
- Review by Algis Budrys (1983) in The Magazine of Fantasy & Science Fiction, July 1983
- Review by Baird Searles (1983) in Isaac Asimov's Science Fiction Magazine, September 1983
- Review by Tom Easton (1983) in Analog Science Fiction/Science Fact, September 1983
- Review by Barrington J. Bayley (1984) in Foundation, #32 November 1984
