= Alternate Empires =

1989 science fiction short story anthology

- Cover of first edition
- Editors: Gregory Benford; Martin H. Greenberg
- Cover artist: Paul Swendsen
- Language: English
- Series: What Might Have Been
- Genre: Science fiction
- Publisher: Bantam Books
- Publication date: August 1989
- Publication place: United States
- Media type: Print (paperback)
- Pages: ix, 291 pp.
- ISBN: 0-553-27845-2
- Preceded by: None
- Followed by: Alternate Heroes

Alternate Empires is an anthology of alternate history science fiction short stories edited by Gregory Benford and Martin H. Greenberg as the first volume in their What Might Have Been series. It was first published in paperback by Bantam Books in August 1989, and in trade paperback by BP Books in March 2004. It was also gathered together with Alternate Heroes into the omnibus anthology What Might Have Been: Volumes 1 & 2: Alternate Empires / Alternate Heroes (Bantam Spectra/SFBC, July 1990).

The book collects twelve novelettes and short stories by various science fiction authors, with an introduction by Benford.

== Contents ==
- "Introduction" (Gregory Benford)
- "In the House of Sorrows" (Poul Anderson)
- "Remaking History" (Kim Stanley Robinson)
- "Counting Potsherds" (Harry Turtledove)
- "Leapfrog" (James P. Hogan)
- "Everything But Honor" (George Alec Effinger)
- "We Could Do Worse" (Gregory Benford)
- "To the Promised Land" (Robert Silverberg)
- "Bible Stories for Adults, No. 31: The Covenant" (James Morrow)
- "All Assassins" (Barry N. Malzberg)
- "Game Night at the Fox and Goose" (Karen Joy Fowler)
- "Waiting for the Olympians" (Frederik Pohl)
- "The Return of William Proxmire" (Larry Niven)
