= Year's Best SF 7 =

2002 anthology edited by David G. Hartwell and Kathryn Cramer

- Author: Edited by David G. Hartwell and Kathryn Cramer
- Language: English
- Series: Year's Best SF
- Genre: Science fiction
- Publisher: Eos
- Publication date: 2002
- Publication place: United States
- Media type: Print (paperback)
- Pages: 498 pp
- ISBN: 0-06-106143-3
- OCLC: 49641132
- LC Class: CPB Box no. 1978 vol. 20
- Preceded by: Year's Best SF 6
- Followed by: Year's Best SF 8

Year's Best SF 7 is a science fiction anthology edited by David G. Hartwell and Kathryn Cramer that was published in 2002. It is the seventh in the Year's Best SF series.

== Contents ==
The book itself, as well as each of the stories, has a short introduction by the editors.

- Nancy Kress: "Computer Virus" (First published in Asimov's, 2001)
- Terry Bisson: "Charlie's Angels" (First published in Sci Fiction, 2001)
- Richard Chwedyk: "The Measure of All Things" (First published in F&SF, 2000)
- Simon Ings: "Russian Vine" (First published in Sci Fiction, 2001)
- Michael Swanwick: "Under's Game" (First published in Sci Fiction, 2001)
- Brian W. Aldiss: "A Matter of Mathematics" (First published in Supertoys Last All Summer Long, 2001)
- Edward M. Lerner: "Creative Destruction" (First published in Analog, 2001)
- David Morrell: "Resurrection" (First published in Redshift, 2001)
- James Morrow: "The Cat's Pajamas" (First published in F&SF, 2001)
- Michael Swanwick: "The Dog Said Bow-Wow" (First published in Asimov's, 2001)
- Ursula K. Le Guin: "The Building" (First published in Redshift, 2001)
- Stephen Baxter: "Gray Earth" (First published in Asimov's, 2001)
- Terry Dowling: "The Lagan Fishers" (First published in Sci Fiction, 2001)
- Thomas M. Disch: "In Xanadu" (First published in Redshift, 2001)
- Lisa Goldstein: "The Go-Between" (First published in Asimov's, 2001)
- Gene Wolfe: "Viewpoint" (First published in Redshift, 2001)
- Gregory Benford: "Anomalies" (First published in Redshift, 2001)
- Alastair Reynolds: "Glacial" (First published in Spectrum SF, 2001)
- James Patrick Kelly: "Undone" (First published in Asimov's, 2001)
