= Mathenauts =

1987 anthology edited by Rudy Rucker

First edition Cover art by Richard M. Powers

Mathenauts: Tales of Mathematical Wonder is a 1987 anthology edited by Rudy Rucker and published by Arbor House.

== Plot summary ==
Mathenauts: Tales of Mathematical Wonder is an anthology of mathematical science fiction stories.

== Reception ==
J. Michael Caparula reviewed Mathenauts: Tales of Mathematical Wonder in Space Gamer/Fantasy Gamer No. 81, and commented that "This is a marvelous collection, and, given the rarity of math fiction, a somewhat priceless one."

Dave Langford reviewed Mathenauts for White Dwarf #99, and stated that "23 nifty SF and fantasy stories in mathematical vein, some familiar, some genuinely mindboggling".

== Reviews ==
- Review by Dan Chow (1987) in Locus, #318 July 1987
- Review by Fernando Quadros Gouvea (1987) in Fantasy Review, July-August 1987
- Review by Tom Easton (1987) in Analog Science Fiction/Science Fact, November 1987
- Review by Don D'Ammassa (1987) in Science Fiction Chronicle, #99 December 1987
- Review by Stephen P. Brown (1987) in Thrust, #28, Fall 1987
