= Eileen Gunn =

American writer

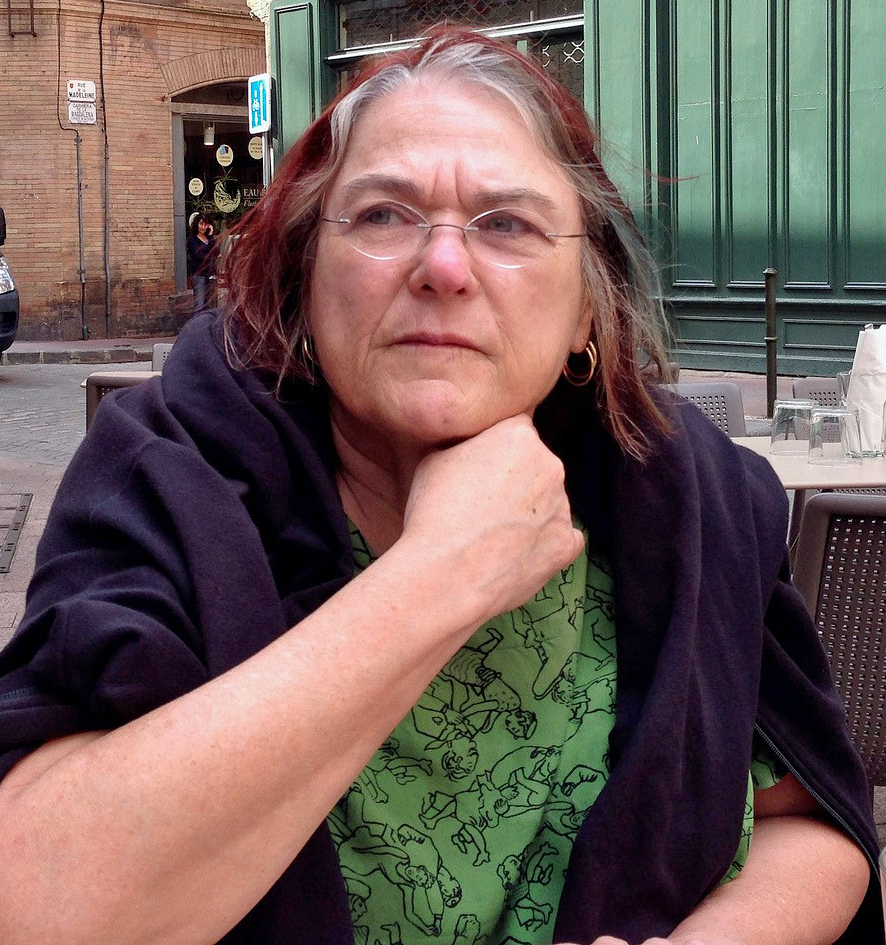
- Gunn in Toulouse, 2014
- Born: June 23, 1945 (age 80) Boston, Massachusetts, U.S.
- Occupation: Author; editor
- Education: Clarion Workshop
- Genre: Science fiction
- Notable awards: Nebula Award for Best Short Story (2005); Sense of Gender Award (2006)

Website
- eileengunn.com

Eileen Gunn (born June 23, 1945, Dorchester, Massachusetts) is an American science fiction author and editor based in Seattle, Washington, who began publishing in 1978. Her story "Coming to Terms", inspired, in part, by a friendship with Avram Davidson, won the Nebula Award for Best Short Story in 2004. Two other stories were nominated for the Hugo Award: "Stable Strategies for Middle Management" (in 1989) and "Computer Friendly" (1990).

== Background ==
Gunn has a background in high-tech advertising and marketing; she wrote advertising for Digital Equipment Corporation in the 1970s and was Director of Advertising at Microsoft in 1985. She is a graduate of the Clarion Workshop and is on the board of directors of the Clarion West Writers Workshop.

== Writing ==
A collection of her short stories, Stable Strategies and Others (2004, published by Tachyon Publications), was nominated for the Philip K. Dick Award and short-listed for the James Tiptree, Jr. Award and the World Fantasy Award. The Japanese translation was awarded the Sense of Gender Award at the 2007 World Science Fiction Convention in Yokohama, Japan.

About the stories: "Stable Strategies for Middle Management" has generally been interpreted as a pastiche of Kafka’s The Metamorphosis, with satiric relevance to late-20th-Century high-tech corporate culture. "Fellow Americans" (1991) posits an alternate history in which Barry Goldwater hired Roger Ailes to run his 1964 presidential campaign, and Richard Nixon became the host of a TV game show called Tricky Dick.

Green Fire (1998), a collaborative novella by Gunn, Michael Swanwick, Pat Murphy, and Andy Duncan, is an homage of sorts, in which Robert A. Heinlein, Isaac Asimov, and Grace Hopper take part in the Philadelphia Experiment, with the assistance of Nicola Tesla and the Aztec deity Quetzalcoatl.

In March 2014 an anthology, Questionable Practices: Stories by Eileen Gunn was published by Small Beer Press.

In August 2022 an anthology, Night Shift was published by PM Press.

== Websites ==
She is also the editor/publisher of the webzine The Infinite Matrix. Her website The Difference Dictionary is an online concordance to The Difference Engine, a novel by William Gibson and Bruce Sterling.

== Bibliography ==
=== Nonfiction ===
==== As editor ====
'The WisCon Chronicles, Vol. 2: Provocative essays on feminism, race, revolution, and the future' with L.Timmel Duchamp. Aqueduct Press. 2008.

=== Short fiction ===
==== Collected ====
Spring Conditions. 1983

Stable Strategies and Others. Tachyon Publishers. 1988, 2012. Hugo nominee. Philip K. Dick nominee. World Fantasy nominee.

Computer Friendly. 1989. Hugo nominee.

Questionable Practices: Stories. Small Beer Press. 2014

Night Shift (Outspoken Authors Book 29), PM Press, 2022

==== Short stories and novellas ====
- "Nirvana High" (with Leslie What), 2004

'Speak, Geek: Every Dog will Have Its Day' Nature, Vol 442,24. August 2006.

'No Place to Raise Kids' Flurb #3. 2007.

'Zeppelin City' with Michael Swanwick. Tor.com. 2009.

'The Armies of Elfland' with Michael Swanwick. Asimov's SF Magazine. 2009.

'The Trains that Climb the Winter Tree' with Michael Swanwick. Tor.com. 2010.

'Steampunk Quartet' a Tor.Com Original. 2011.

'After the Thaw' Flurb #12. 2011.

'Phantom Pain' Lightspeed Magazine. 2017.

'Nightshift' in Visions, Ventures, Escape Velocities: A Collection of Space Futures. Arizona State University, Center for Science and the Imagination. 2017

'What are Friends For?' Fantastic Fiction. 2021

| Title | Year | First published | Reprinted/collected | Notes |
|---|---|---|---|---|
| 'Fellow Americans' | 1992 | Alternate Presidents | | |
| 'Shed that guilt! Double your productivity overnight!' | 2008 | Swanwick, Michael; Gunn, Eileen (Sep 2008). "'Shed that guilt! Double your productivity overnight!'". F&SF. 115 (3): 129–136. | | |
