= Flurb =

American science fiction webzine

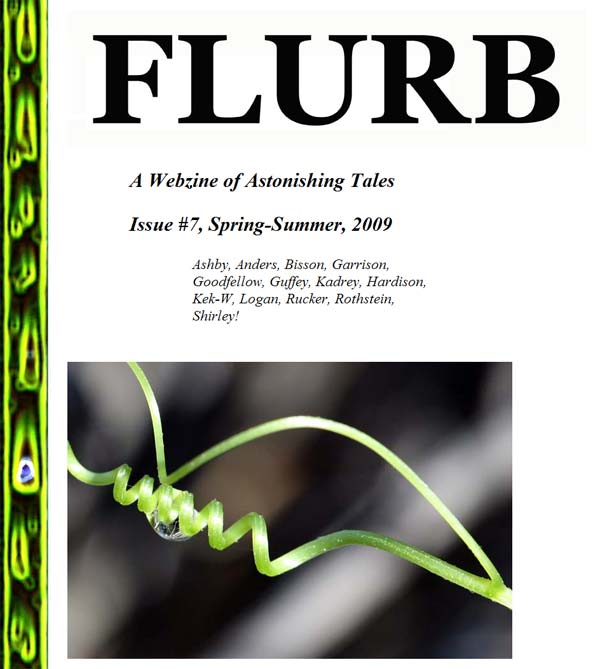
- Cover of Flurb #7
- Website type: Online magazine
- Owner: Rudy Rucker
- Creator: Various
- Website: Flurb
- Commercial: No
- Launched: August 20, 2006
- Current status: Archive

Flurb was an American science fiction webzine, edited by author Rudy Rucker and launched in August 2006. In addition to short stories, Flurb featured paintings and photography by Rucker. It was released biannually. The author of an accepted story retained full copyright, including the right to have the story published elsewhere, and to request that it be taken down at any time.

Flurb releases tended to garner significant online attention, with issues having been mentioned in several blogs including Boing Boing and io9.

Contributors to Flurb included Terry Bisson, Eileen Gunn, John Kessel, Kim Stanley Robinson, Paul Di Filippo, John Shirley, Charles Stross and Cory Doctorow, as well as Rucker himself.

Flurb closed in 2012.
