= R. Garcia y Robertson =

American novelist

Rodrigo Garcia y Robertson (born 1949) is an American writer of historical and fantasy fiction. He holds a Ph.D. in history and taught at UCLA and Villanova University before becoming a full-time writer. In addition to his eight novels, he has had numerous short stories published in fantasy and science fiction anthologies. He lives in Mount Vernon, Washington.

== Bibliography ==
=== Novels ===
- The Spiral Dance (Avon Books, 1991) ISBN 0-380-76518-7
- American Woman (New York: Forge Books/Tom Doherty Associates, 1998) ISBN 0-312-86146-X
- Firebird (New York: Tor Books/Tom Doherty Associates, 2006) ISBN 0-7653-1356-1

Knight Errant series

1. Knight Errant (New York: Forge Books/Tom Doherty Associates, 2001) ISBN 0-312-86996-7
2. Lady Robyn (New York: Forge Books/Tom Doherty Associates, 2003) ISBN 0-312-86995-9
3. White Rose (New York: Forge Books/Tom Doherty Associates, 2004) ISBN 0-312-86994-0

The Virgin and the Dinosaur series

1. The Virgin and the Dinosaur (Avon Books, 1996) ISBN 0-380-77978-1
2. Atlantis Found (Avon Books, 1997) ISBN 0-380-78678-8

=== Short fiction ===
Collections

- The Moon Maid and Other Fantastic Adventures (Collinsville, Illinois: Golden Gryphon Press, 1998) ISBN 0-9655901-8-6

Short stories

- "Firebird" in In Lands That Never Were: Tales of Swords and Sorcery from the Magazine of Fantasy & Science Fiction, Gordon Van Gelder, editor (New York: Thunder's Mouth Press, 2004) ISBN 1-56858-314-1
- "Fair Verona" in Year's Best SF 3, David G. Hartwell, editor (New York: HarperPrism, 1998) ISBN 0-06-105901-3
- "Oxygen Rising" in Year's Best SF 11, David G. Hartwell and Kathryn Cramer, editors (New York: EOS/HarperCollins, 2006) ISBN 0-06-087341-8

Title	Year	First published	Reprinted/collected	Notes
Werewolves of Luna	1994	Garcia y Robertson, R. (Dec 1994). "Werewolves of Luna". Asimov.		Novella
The other magpie	1998	Garcia y Robertson, R. "The other magpie". In Notkin, Debbie & The Secret Feminist Cabal (eds.). Flying cups & saucers : gender explorations in science fiction & fantasy. Cambridge, Mass.: Edgewood Press.		
A Princess of Helium	1998	Garcia y Robertson, R. (Sep 1998). "A Princess of Helium". F&SF.		
Bird herding	2000	Garcia y Robertson, R. (May 2000). "Bird herding". F&SF. 98 (5): 117–160.		Novelette
The Iron Wood	2000	Garcia y Robertson, R. (Aug 2000). "The Iron Wood". F&SF. 99 (2): 129–160.		Novelette
The Girl Who Stole Herself	2017	Garcia y Robertson, R. (Jul 2017). "The Girl who Stole Herself". Asimov. 41 (7&8).		Novella
