= The Eye of the Sibyl (collection) =

1992 collection of science fiction stories by Philip K. Dick

- Cover of the first edition
- Author: Philip K. Dick
- Cover artist: Kevin Kelly
- Language: English
- Genre: Science fiction
- Publisher: Citadel Twilight
- Publication date: 1992
- Publication place: United States
- Media type: Print (paperback)
- Pages: 395
- ISBN: 0-8065-1328-4
- OCLC: 26613988

The Eye of the Sibyl is a collection of science fiction stories by American writer Philip K. Dick. It was first published by Citadel Twilight in 1992 and reprints Volume V of The Collected Stories of Philip K. Dick, omitting the story "We Can Remember It for You Wholesale". Many of the stories had originally appeared in the magazines Worlds of Tomorrow, Galaxy Science Fiction, Amazing Stories, Fantasy and Science Fiction, Famous Science Fiction, Niekas, Rolling Stone College Papers, Interzone, Playboy, Omni and The Yuba City High Times.

== Contents ==
- Introduction, by Thomas M. Disch
- "The Little Black Box"
- "The War with the Fnools"
- "Precious Artifact"
- "Retreat Syndrome"
- "A Terran Odyssey"
- "Your Appointment Will Be Yesterday"
- "Holy Quarrel"
- "A Game of Unchance"
- "Not By Its Cover"
- "Return Match"
- "Faith of Our Fathers"
- "The Story to End All Stories for Harlan Ellison’s Anthology Dangerous Visions"
- "The Electric Ant"
- "Cadbury, the Beaver Who Lacked"
- "A Little Something for Us Tempunauts"
- "The Pre-persons"
- "The Eye of the Sibyl"
- "The Day Mr. Computer Fell out of its Tree"
- "The Exit Door Leads In"
- "Chains of Air, Web of Aether"
- "Strange Memories of Death"
- "I Hope I Shall Arrive Soon"
- "Rautavaara's Case"
- "The Alien Mind"
- Notes
