= The Best Science Fiction of the Year 8 =

1979 anthology edited by Terry Carr

The Best Science Fiction of the Year #8
- Cover of first edition, 1979
- Editor: Terry Carr
- Language: English
- Series: The Best Science Fiction of the Year
- Genre: Science fiction
- Publisher: Del Rey Books
- Publication date: 1979
- Publication place: United States
- Media type: Print (paperback)
- Pages: 363
- ISBN: 0-345-28083-0
- Preceded by: The Best Science Fiction of the Year 7
- Followed by: The Best Science Fiction of the Year 9

The Best Science Fiction of the Year #8 is an anthology of science fiction short stories edited by Terry Carr, the eighth volume in a series of sixteen. It was first published in paperback by Del Rey Books in July 1979, and in hardcover by the same publisher in conjunction with the Science Fiction Book Club in August 1979. The first British edition was issued by Gollancz in the same year.

The book collects twelve novelettes and short stories by various science fiction authors, with an introduction, notes and concluding essays by Carr and Charles N. Brown. The stories were previously published in 1978 in the magazines Isaac Asimov's Science Fiction Magazine, Omni, Analog Science Fiction/Science Fact, and The Magazine of Fantasy & Science Fiction, and the anthologies Andromeda 3, Anticipations, and Universe 8.

== Contents ==
- "Introduction" (Terry Carr)
- "The Barbie Murders" (John Varley)
- "A Hiss of Dragon" (Gregory Benford and Marc Laidlaw)
- "Black Glass" (Fritz Leiber)
- "To Bring in the Steel" (Donald Kingsbury)
- "The Very Slow Time Machine" (Ian Watson)
- "Devil You Don't Know" (Dean Ing)
- "Count the Clock That Tells the Time" (Harlan Ellison)
- "View from a Height" (Joan D. Vinge)
- "The Morphology of the Kirkham Wreck" (Hilbert Schenck)
- "Vermeer's Window" (Gordon Eklund)
- "The Man Who Had No Idea" (Thomas M. Disch)
- "Death Therapy" (James Patrick Kelly)
- "Recommended Reading - 1978" (Terry Carr)
- "The Science Fiction Year" (Charles N. Brown)

== Awards ==
The anthology placed third in the 1980 Locus Poll Award for Best Anthology.

"The Barbie Murders" was nominated for the 1979 Hugo Award for Best Novelette, placed first in the 1979 Locus Poll Award for Best Novelette, and won the 1995 James Tiptree, Jr. Award, Classics.

"A Hiss of Dragon" placed fifth in the 1979 Locus Poll Award for Best Short Story.

"Black Glass" placed eleventh in the 1979 Locus Poll Award for Best Novelette.

"The Very Slow Time Machine" was nominated for the 1979 Hugo Award for Best Short Story and placed eleventh in the 1979 Locus Poll Award for Best Short Story.

"Devil You Don't Know" was nominated for the 1978 Nebula Award for Best Novelette and the 1979 Hugo Award for Best Novelette, and placed fifth in the 1979 Locus Poll Award for Best Novelette.

"Count the Clock That Tells the Time" was nominated for the 1979 Hugo Award for Best Short Story and placed first in the 1979 Locus Poll Award for Best Short Story.

"View from a Height" was nominated for the 1979 Hugo Award for Best Short Story and placed second in the 1979 Locus Poll Award for Best Short Story.

"The Morphology of the Kirkham Wreck placed fourteenth in the 1979 Locus Poll Award for Best Novelette.

"The Man Who Had No Idea" was nominated for the 1979 Hugo Award for Best Novelette and placed eighth in the 1979 Locus Poll Award for Best Novelette.
