= The Best Science Fiction of the Year 4 =

1975 anthology edited by Terry Carr

The Best Science Fiction of the Year #4
- Cover of first edition, 1975
- Editor: Terry Carr
- Language: English
- Series: The Best Science Fiction of the Year
- Genre: Science fiction
- Publisher: Ballantine Books
- Publication date: 1975
- Publication place: United States
- Media type: Print (paperback)
- Pages: 304
- ISBN: 0-345-24529-6
- Preceded by: The Best Science Fiction of the Year 3
- Followed by: The Best Science Fiction of the Year 5

The Best Science Fiction of the Year #4 is an anthology of science fiction short stories edited by Terry Carr, the fourth volume in a series of sixteen. It was first published in paperback by Ballantine Books in July 1975, and reissued in October 1976. The first British edition was published in hardcover by Gollancz in September 1975.

The book collects ten novellas, novelettes and short stories by various science fiction authors, with an introduction, notes and concluding essays by Carr and Charles N. Brown. The stories were previously published in 1974 in the magazines Analog Science Fiction/Science Fact, The Magazine of Fantasy & Science Fiction, and Worlds of If, and the anthologies Final Stage: The Ultimate Science Fiction Anthology, New Worlds 7, Fellowship of the Stars, Wandering Stars: An Anthology of Jewish Fantasy and Science Fiction, and Universe 4.

== Contents ==
- "Introduction" (Terry Carr)
- "We Purchased People" (Frederik Pohl)
- "Pale Roses" (Michael Moorcock)
- "The Hole Man" (Larry Niven)
- "Born with the Dead" (Robert Silverberg)
- "The Author of the Acacia Seeds and Other Extracts from the Journal of the Association of Therolinguistics" (Ursula K. Le Guin)
- "Dark Icarus" (Bob Shaw)
- "A Little Something for Us Tempunauts" (Philip K. Dick)
- "On Venus, Have We Got a Rabbi" (William Tenn)
- "The Engine at Heartspring's " (Roger Zelazny)
- "If the Stars Are Gods" (Gordon Eklund and Gregory Benford)
- "Honorable Mentions - 1974" (Terry Carr)
- "The Science Fiction Year" (Charles N. Brown)

== Awards ==
The anthology placed second in the 1976 Locus Poll Award for Best Anthology.

"We Purchased People" placed eleventh in the 1975 Locus Poll Award for Best Short Story.

"The Hole Man" won the 1975 Hugo Award for Best Short Story and placed second in the 1975 Locus Poll Award for Best Short Story.

"Born with the Dead" won the 1974 Nebula Award for Best Novella, was nominated for the 1975 Hugo Award for Best Novella, and placed first in the 1975 Locus Poll Award for Best Novella.

"A Little Something for Us Temponauts" placed eighteenth in the 1975 Locus Poll Award for Best Novelette.

"On Venus, Have We Got a Rabbi" placed fifth in the 1975 Locus Poll Award for Best Novelette.

"The Engine at Heartspring's Center" was nominated for the 1974 Nebula Award for Best Short Story and placed fifth in the 1975 Locus Poll Award for Best Short Story.

"If the Stars Are Gods" won the 1974 Nebula Award for Best Novelette and placed eighth in the 1975 Locus Poll Award for Best Novelette.
