= The Best Science Fiction of the Year 9 =

Science Fiction Anthology by Terry Carr

The Best Science Fiction of the Year #9
- Cover of first edition, 1980
- Editor: Terry Carr
- Language: English
- Series: The Best Science Fiction of the Year
- Genre: Science fiction short stories
- Publisher: Del Rey Books
- Publication date: 1980
- Publication place: United States
- Media type: Print (paperback)
- Pages: 369
- ISBN: 0-345-28601-4
- Preceded by: The Best Science Fiction of the Year 8
- Followed by: The Best Science Fiction of the Year 10

The Best Science Fiction of the Year #9 is an anthology of science fiction short stories edited by Terry Carr, the ninth volume in a series of sixteen. It was first published in paperback by Del Rey Books in August 1980, and in hardcover by Gollancz in October of the same year.

The book collects fourteen novelettes and short stories by various science fiction authors, with an introduction, notes and concluding essays by Carr and Charles N. Brown. The stories were previously published in 1978 and 1979 in the magazines Omni, Isaac Asimov's Science Fiction Magazine, Rolling Stone College Papers, and The Magazine of Fantasy & Science Fiction, and the anthologies Universe 9 and Rooms of Paradise.

== Contents ==
- "Introduction" (Terry Carr)
- "Galatea Galante, The Perfect Popsy" (Alfred Bester)
- "Sandkings" (George R. R. Martin)
- "Time Shards" (Gregory Benford)
- "In the Country of the Blind, No One Can See" (Melisa Michaels)
- "Re-deem the Time" (David Lake)
- "Down & Out on Ellfive Prime" (Dean Ing)
- "The Exit Door Leads In" (Philip K. Dick)
- "Options" (John Varley)
- "In Trophonius's Cave" (James P. Girard)
- "Fireflood" (Vonda N. McIntyre)
- "No More Pencils, No More Books" (John Morressy)
- "The Vacuum-Packed Picnic" (Rick Gauger)
- "The Thaw" (Tanith Lee)
- "In a Petri Dish Upstairs" (George Turner)
- "Recommended Reading - 1979" (Terry Carr)
- "The Science Fiction Year" (Charles N. Brown)

== Awards ==
The anthology placed second in the 1981 Locus Poll Award for Best Anthology.

"Galatea Galante" placed fifth in the 1980 Locus Poll Award for Best Novelette.

"Sandkings" won the 1979 Nebula Award for Best Novelette and the 1980 Hugo Award for Best Novelette, placed first in the 1980 Locus Poll Award for Best Novelette, and was nominated for the 1980 Balrog Award for Short Fiction.

"Down & Out on Ellfive Prime" placed fourteenth in the 1980 Locus Poll Award for Best Novelette.

"The Exit Door Leads In" placed fourteenth in the 1980 Locus Poll Award for Best Short Story.

"Options" was nominated for the 1979 Nebula Award for Best Novelette and the 1980 Hugo Award for Best Novelette, and placed second in the 1980 Locus Poll Award for Best Novelette.

"In Trophonius's Cave" placed eighth in the 1980 Locus Poll Award for Best Short Story.

"Fireflood" was nominated for the 1980 Hugo Award for Best Novelette and placed third in the 1980 Locus Poll Award for Best Novelette.
