= The Best Science Fiction of the Year 11 =

1982 anthology edited by Terry Carr

The Best Science Fiction of the Year #11
- Cover of first edition, 1982
- Editor: Terry Carr
- Language: English
- Series: The Best Science Fiction of the Year
- Genre: Science fiction
- Publisher: Pocket Books
- Publication date: 1982
- Publication place: United States
- Media type: Print (paperback)
- Pages: 438
- ISBN: 0-671-44483-2
- Preceded by: The Best Science Fiction of the Year 10
- Followed by: The Best Science Fiction of the Year 12

The Best Science Fiction of the Year #11 is an anthology of science fiction short stories edited by Terry Carr, the eleventh volume in a series of sixteen. It was first published in paperback by Pocket Books in July 1982, and in hardcover by Gollancz in the same year.

The book collects seventeen novellas, novelettes and short stories by various science fiction authors, with an introduction, notes and concluding essays by Carr and Charles N. Brown. The stories were previously published in 1981 in the magazines Analog Science Fiction/Science Fact, The Magazine of Fantasy & Science Fiction, Isaac Asimov's Science Fiction Magazine, Omni, and Science Fiction Digest, the collection A Rhapsody in Amber, and the anthologies Universe 11 and New Dimensions 12.

== Contents ==
- "Introduction" (Terry Carr)
- "The Saturn Game" (Poul Anderson)
- "Walk the Ice" (Mildred Downey Broxon)
- "Trial Sample" (Ted Reynolds)
- "The Pusher" (John Varley)
- "Venice Drowned" (Kim Stanley Robinson)
- "Walden Three" (Michael Swanwick)
- "Second Comings - Reasonable Rates" (Pat Cadigan)
- "Forever" (Damon Knight)
- "Emergence" (David R. Palmer)
- "You Can't Go Back" (R. A. Lafferty)
- "Walpurgisnacht" (Roger Zelazny)
- "The Woman the Unicorn Loved" (Gene Wolfe)
- "Serpent's Teeth" (Spider Robinson)
- "The Thermals of August" (Edward Bryant)
- "Going Under" (Jack Dann)
- "The Quiet" (George Guthridge as George Florance-Guthridge)
- "Swarmer, Skimmer" (Gregory Benford)
- "The Science Fiction Year" (Charles N. Brown)
- "Recommended Reading - 1981" (Terry Carr)

== Awards ==
The anthology placed first in the 1983 Locus Award for Best Anthology.

"The Saturn Game" won the 1981 Nebula Award for Best Novella and the 1982 Hugo Award for Best Novella, was nominated for the 1981 Analog Award for Best Novella, and placed second in the 1982 Locus Poll Award for Best Novella.

"Walk the Ice" placed thirteenth in the 1982 Locus Poll Award for Best Short Story.

"The Pusher" was nominated for the 1981 Nebula Award for Best Short Story, won the 1982 SF Chronicle Award for Best Short Story and the 1982 Hugo Award for Best Short Story, and placed first in the 1982 Locus Poll Award for Best Short Story.

"Venice Drowned" was nominated for the 1981 Nebula Award for Best Short Story and placed seventeenth in the 1982 Locus Poll Award for Best Short Story.

"Walden Three" placed twenty-first in the 1982 Locus Poll Award for Best Novelette.

"Second Comings -- Reasonable Rates" placed eighteenth in the 1982 Locus Poll Award for Best Short Story.

"Forever" placed fourteenth in the 1982 Locus Poll Award for Best Short Story.

"Emergence" won the 1981 Analog Award for Best Novella/Novelette, was nominated for the 1982 Hugo Award for Best Novella, and placed twelfth in the 1982 Locus Poll Award for Best Novella.

"The Woman the Unicorn Loved" was nominated for the 1982 Hugo Award for Best Short Story and placed sixth in the 1982 Locus Poll Award for Best Short Story.

"Serpent's Teeth" placed second in the 1982 Locus Poll Award for Best Short Story.

"The Thermals of August" was nominated for the 1981 Nebula Award for Best Novelette and the 1982 Hugo Award for Best Novelette, and placed third in the 1982 Locus Poll Award for Best Novelette.

"Going Under" was nominated for the 1981 Nebula Award for Best Short Story and placed twenty-third in the 1982 Locus Poll Award for Best Novelette.

"The Quiet" was nominated for the 1981 Nebula Award for Best Short Story and the 1982 Hugo Award for Best Short Story, and placed eighth in the 1982 Locus Poll Award for Best Short Story.

"Swarmer, Skimmer" was nominated for the 1981 Nebula Award for Best Novella and placed eleventh in the 1982 Locus Poll Award for Best Novella.
