= The Best Science Fiction of the Year 5 =

1976 anthology edited by Terry Carr

The Best Science Fiction of the Year #5
- Cover of first edition, 1976
- Editor: Terry Carr
- Language: English
- Series: The Best Science Fiction of the Year
- Genre: Science fiction
- Publisher: Ballantine Books
- Publication date: 1976
- Publication place: United States
- Media type: Print (paperback)
- Pages: 367
- ISBN: 0-345-25064-8
- Preceded by: The Best Science Fiction of the Year 4
- Followed by: The Best Science Fiction of the Year 6

The Best Science Fiction of the Year #5 is an anthology of science fiction short stories edited by Terry Carr, the fifth volume in a series of sixteen. It was first published in paperback by Ballantine Books in July 1976.

The book collects twelve novellas, novelettes and short stories by various science fiction authors, with an introduction, notes and concluding essays by Carr and Charles N. Brown. The stories were previously published in 1975 in the magazines The Magazine of Fantasy & Science Fiction, Analog Science Fiction/Science Fact, and Amazing Science Fiction, and the anthologies The New Improved Sun, The New Atlantis and Other Novellas of Science Fiction, and New Dimensions Science Fiction Number 5,

== Contents ==
- "Introduction" (Terry Carr)
- "Down to a Sunless Sea" (Cordwainer Smith and Genevieve Linebarger (uncredited))
- "Retrograde Summer" (John Varley)
- "The Hero as Werwolf" (Gene Wolfe)
- "The Silent Eyes of Time" (Algis Budrys)
- "Croatoan" (Harlan Ellison)
- "Doing Lennon" (Gregory Benford)
- "The New Atlantis" (Ursula K. Le Guin)
- "Clay Suburb" (Robert F. Young)
- "The Storms of Windhaven" (George R. R. Martin and Lisa Tuttle)
- "Child of All Ages" (P. J. Plauger)
- "In the Bowl" (John Varley)
- "Sail the Tide of Mourning" (Richard A. Lupoff)
- "Honorable Mentions - 1975" (Terry Carr)
- "The Science Fiction Year" (Charles N. Brown)

== Awards ==
The anthology placed first in the 1977 Locus Award for Best Anthology.

"Down to a Sunless Sea" was nominated for the 1976 Ditmar Award for Best International Long Fiction and placed second in the 1976 Locus Poll Award for Best Novelette.

"Retrograde Summer" was nominated for the 1975 Nebula Award for Best Novelette and placed fourth in the 1976 Locus Poll Award for Best Novelette.

"The Silent Eyes of Time" was nominated for the 1976 Hugo Award for Best Novella and placed fourth in the 1976 Locus Poll Award for Best Novella.

"Croatoan" was nominated for the 1976 Hugo Award for Best Short Story and placed first in the 1976 Locus Poll Award for Best Short Story.

"Doing Lennon" was nominated for the 1975 Nebula Award for Best Short Story and the 1976 Hugo Award for Best Short Story, and placed fifth in the 1976 Locus Poll Award for Best Short Story.

"The New Atlantis" was nominated for the 1975 Nebula Award for Best Novelette and the 1976 Hugo Award for Best Novelette, and placed first in the 1976 Locus Poll Award for Best Novelette.

"Clay Suburb" placed thirteenth in the 1976 Locus Poll Award for Best Short Story.

"The Storms of Windhaven" was nominated for the 1975 Nebula Award for Best Novella and the 1976 Hugo Award for Best Novella, and placed first in the 1976 Locus Poll Award for Best Novella.

"Child of All Ages" was nominated for the 1975 Nebula Award for Best Short Story and the 1976 Hugo Award for Best Short Story, and placed third in the 1976 Locus Poll Award for Best Short Story.

"In the Bowl" placed seventh in the 1976 Locus Poll Award for Best Novelette and was nominated for the 1976 Nebula Award for Best Novelette,

"Sail the Tide of Mourning" was nominated for the 1975 Nebula Award for Best Short Story and the 1976 Hugo Award for Best Short Story, and placed fourth in the 1976 Locus Poll Award for Best Short Story.
