= The Best Science Fiction of the Year 12 =

1983 anthology edited by Terry Carr

The Best Science Fiction of the Year #12
- Cover of first edition, 1983
- Editor: Terry Carr
- Language: English
- Series: The Best Science Fiction of the Year
- Genre: Science fiction
- Publisher: Pocket Books
- Publication date: 1983
- Publication place: United States
- Media type: Print (paperback)
- Pages: 357
- ISBN: 0-671-46680-1
- Preceded by: The Best Science Fiction of the Year 11
- Followed by: The Best Science Fiction of the Year 13

The Best Science Fiction of the Year #12 is an anthology of science fiction short stories edited by Terry Carr, the twelfth volume in a series of sixteen. It was first published in paperback by Pocket Books in July 1983, and in hardcover by Gollancz in the same year.

The book collects thirteen novellas, novelettes and short stories by various science fiction authors, with an introduction, notes and concluding essays by Carr and Charles N. Brown. The stories were previously published in 1982 in the magazines The Magazine of Fantasy & Science Fiction, Omni, Analog Science Fiction/Science Fact, The New Yorker, and Isaac Asimov's Science Fiction Magazine, and the anthologies Perpetual Light and Universe 12.

== Contents ==
- "Introduction" (Terry Carr)
- "The Pope of the Chimps" (Robert Silverberg)
- "Swarm" (Bruce Sterling)
- "Souls" (Joanna Russ)
- "Burning Chrome" (William Gibson)
- "Farmer on the Dole" (Frederik Pohl)
- "Meet Me at Apogee" (Bill Johnson)
- "Sur" (Ursula K. Le Guin)
- "Understanding Human Behavior" (Thomas M. Disch)
- "Relativistic Effects" (Gregory Benford)
- "Firewatch" (Connie Willis)
- "The Wooing of Slowboat Sadie" (O. Niemand)
- "With the Original Cast" (Nancy Kress)
- "When the Fathers Go" (Bruce McAllister)
- "The Science Fiction Year" (Charles N. Brown)
- "Recommended Reading – 1982" (Terry Carr)

== Awards ==
The anthology placed first in the 1984 Locus Award for Best Anthology.

"The Pope of the Chimps" was nominated for the 1982 Nebula Award for Best Short Story and placed twelfth in the 1983 Locus Poll Award for Best Novelette.

"Swarm" was nominated for the 1982 Nebula Award for Best Novelette and the 1983 Hugo Award for Best Novelette, and placed sixth in the 1983 Locus Poll Award for Best Novelette.

"Souls" was nominated for the 1982 Nebula Award for Best Novella, won the 1983 Hugo Award for Best Novella and the 1983 SF Chronicle Award for Best Novella, and placed first in the 1983 Locus Poll Award for Best Novella.

"Burning Chrome" was nominated for the 1982 Nebula Award for Best Novelette and placed seventeenth in the 1983 Locus Poll Award for Best Novelette.

"Farmer on the Dole" placed sixteenth in the 1983 Locus Poll Award for Best Novelette.

"Meet Me At Apogee" placed twenty-seventh in the 1983 Locus Poll Award for Best Short Story.

"Sur" was nominated for the 1983 Hugo Award for Best Short Story and placed first in the 1983 Locus Poll Award for Best Short Story.

"Understanding Human Behavior" was nominated for the 1982 Nebula Award for Best Novelette and placed tenth in the 1983 Locus Poll Award for Best Novelette.

"Relativistic Effects" placed nineteenth in the 1983 Locus Poll Award for Best Novelette.

"Fire Watch" won the 1982 Nebula Award for Best Novelette, the 1983 Hugo Award for Best Novelette, and the 1983 SF Chronicle Award for Best Novelette, was nominated for the 1983 Balrog Award for Best Short Fiction, and placed fourth in the 1983 Locus Poll Award for Best Novelette.
