= Terry Carr's Best Science Fiction of the Year 15 =

1986 anthology edited by Terry Carr

Terry Carr's Best Science Fiction of the Year #15
- Cover of first edition, 1986
- Editor: Terry Carr
- Language: English
- Series: The Best Science Fiction of the Year
- Genre: Science fiction
- Publisher: Tor Books
- Publication date: 1986
- Publication place: United States
- Media type: Print (paperback)
- Pages: 379
- ISBN: 0-8125-3267-8
- Preceded by: Terry Carr's Best Science Fiction of the Year
- Followed by: Terry Carr's Best Science Fiction and Fantasy of the Year 16

Terry Carr's Best Science Fiction of the Year #15 is an anthology of science fiction short stories edited by Terry Carr, the fifteenth volume in a series of sixteen. It was first published in paperback by Tor Books in August 1986 and in hardcover and paperback by Gollancz in October of the same year, under the alternate title Best SF of the Year #15.

The book collects twelve novellas, novelettes and short stories by various science fiction authors, with an introduction, notes and concluding essays by Carr and Charles N. Brown. The stories were previously published in 1985 in the magazines Isaac Asimov's Science Fiction Magazine, Omni, Analog Science Fiction and Fact, The Magazine of Fantasy & Science Fiction, and Interzone, the anthology L. Ron Hubbard Presents Writers of the Future, the collection Fire Watch, and the chapbook Of Space/Time and the River.

== Contents ==
- "Introduction" (Terry Carr)
- "Sailing to Byzantium" (Robert Silverberg)
- "Flying Saucer Rock & Roll" (Howard Waldrop)
- "Bluff" (Harry Turtledove)
- "A Spanish Lesson" (Lucius Shepard)
- "Snow" (John Crowley)
- "Shanidar" (David Zindell)
- "All My Darling Daughters" (Connie Willis)
- "Of Space-Time and the River" (Gregory Benford)
- "A Gift from the GrayLanders" (Michael Bishop)
- "Praxis" (Karen Joy Fowler)
- "The People on the Precipice" (Ian Watson)
- "The Only Neat Thing to Do" (James Tiptree, Jr.)
- "1985, the SF Year in Review" (Charles N. Brown)
- "Recommended Reading" (Terry Carr)

== Reception ==
Dave Langford reviewed Terry Carr's Best Science Fiction of the Year 15 for White Dwarf #84, and stated that "as always well chosen, a dozen of 1985's finest stories".

Wendy Graham reviewed Best SF of the Year 15 for Adventurer magazine and stated that "One of the dullest in this normally excellent annual collection. Half of the stories are alright, half unspeakably naff."

=== Awards ===
The anthology placed third in the 1987 Locus Poll Award for Best Anthology.

"Sailing to Byzantium" won the 1985 Nebula Award for Best Novella, was nominated for the 1986 Hugo Award for Best Novella and the 1986 SF Chronicle Award for Best Novella, and placed second in the 1986 Locus Poll Award for Best Novella.

"Flying Saucer Rock & Roll" was nominated for the 1985 Nebula Award for Best Short Story and the 1986 Hugo Award for Best Short Story, and placed eighth in the 1986 Locus Poll Award for Best Short Story.

"A Spanish Lesson" placed eleventh in the 1986 Locus Poll Award for Best Novelette.

"Snow" was nominated for the 1985 Nebula Award for Best Short Story and the 1986 Hugo Award for Best Short Story, and placed third in the 1986 Locus Poll Award for Best Short Story.

"Shanidar" placed twenty-first in the 1986 Locus Poll Award for Best Novelette.

"All My Darling Daughters" placed seventh in the 1986 Locus Poll Award for Best Novelette.

"Of Space-Time and the River" placed sixth in the 1987 Locus Poll Award for Best Novelette.

"A Gift from the Graylanders" was nominated for the 1985 Nebula Award for Best Novelette and the 1986 Hugo Award for Best Novelette, and placed eighth in the 1986 Locus Poll Award for Best Novelette.

"The People on the Precipice" was nominated for the 1985 British Science Fiction Award for Best Short Fiction.

"The Only Neat Thing to Do" was nominated for the 1985 Nebula Award for Best Novella and the 1986 Hugo Award for Best Novella, won the 1986 SF Chronicle Award for Best Novella, and placed first in the 1986 Locus Poll Award for Best Novella.
