= Terry Carr's Best Science Fiction and Fantasy of the Year 16 =

1987 anthology edited by Terry Carr

Terry Carr's Best Science Fiction and Fantasy of the Year #16
- Cover of first edition, 1987
- Editor: Terry Carr
- Cover artist: Peter Gudynas
- Language: English
- Series: The Best Science Fiction of the Year
- Genre: Science fiction
- Publisher: Tor Books
- Publication date: 1987
- Publication place: United States
- Media type: Print (paperback)
- Pages: 402
- ISBN: 0-312-93025-9
- Preceded by: Terry Carr's Best Science Fiction of the Year 15

Terry Carr's Best Science Fiction and Fantasy of the Year #16 is an anthology of science fiction short stories edited by Terry Carr, the sixteenth and last volume in a series of sixteen. It was first published in hardcover by Tor Books in September 1987. The first British editions were published in hardcover and paperback by Gollancz in December of the same year, under the alternate title Best SF of the Year #16.

The book collects eleven novellas, novelettes and short stories by various science fiction authors, with an introduction, notes and concluding essays by Carr, Charles N. Brown, and Beth Meacham. The stories were previously published in 1986 in the magazines Isaac Asimov's Science Fiction Magazine, Playboy, The Magazine of Fantasy & Science Fiction, and Analog Science Fiction and Fact, and the collection Blue Champagne.

== Contents ==
- "Editor's Note" (Beth Meacham)
- "Introduction" (Terry Carr)
- "Escape from Kathmandu" (Kim Stanley Robinson)
- "Hatrack River" (Orson Scott Card)
- "Blindsight" (Robert Silverberg)
- "Galileo Complains" (Carter Scholz)
- "Aymara" (Lucius Shepard)
- "Cold Light" (Ian Watson)
- "Surviving" (Judith Moffett)
- "The Prisoner of Chillon" (James Patrick Kelly)
- "And so to Bed" (Harry Turtledove)
- "Grave Angels" (Richard Kearns)
- "Tango Charlie and Foxtrot Romeo" (John Varley)
- "1986, the SF and Fantasy Year in Review" (Charles N. Brown)
- "Recommended Reading" (Terry Carr)

== Awards ==
The anthology placed third in the 1988 Locus Poll Award for Best Anthology.

"Escape from Kathmandu" was nominated for the 1986 Nebula Award for Best Novella, the 1987 Asimov Reader's Poll for Best Novella, the 1987 Hugo Award for Best Novella, and the 1987 SF Chronicle Award for Best Novella, and placed second in the 1987 Locus Poll Award for Best Novella.

"Hatrack River" was nominated for the 1986 Nebula Award for Best Novelette, the 1987 Asimov Reader's Poll for Best Novelette, the 1987 Hugo Award for Best Novelette, and the 1987 SF Chronicle Award for Best Novelette, won the 1987 World Fantasy Award for Best Novella, and placed second in the 1987 Locus Poll Award for Best Novelette.

"Blindsight" placed fifteenth in the 1987 Locus Poll Award for Best Short Story.

"Aymara" was nominated for the 1986 Nebula Award for Best Novelette, won the 1987 SF Chronicle Award for Best Novelette, and placed seventh in the 1987 Locus Poll Award for Best Novelette.

"Cold Light" placed twenty-first in the 1987 Locus Poll Award for Best Novelette.

"Surviving" was nominated for the 1986 Nebula Award for Best Novelette, won the 1987 Theodore Sturgeon Memorial Short Story Award, and placed twenty-eighth in the 1987 Locus Poll Award for Best Novelette.

"The Prisoner of Chillon" won the 1987 Asimov Reader's Poll for Best Novelette and placed twenty-third in the 1987 Locus Poll Award for Best Best Novelette.

"And So to Bed" placed fourteenth in the 1987 Locus Poll Award for Best Short Story.

"Grave Angels" placed twenty-seventh in the 1987 Locus Poll Award for Best Novelette and was nominated for the 1987 Theodore Sturgeon Memorial Short Story Award.

"Tango Charlie and Foxtrot Romeo" placed third in the 1987 Locus Poll Award for Best Novella.
