= The Best Science Fiction of the Year 10 =

1981 anthology edited by Terry Carr

The Best Science Fiction of the Year #10
- Cover of first edition, 1981
- Editor: Terry Carr
- Language: English
- Series: The Best Science Fiction of the Year
- Genre: Science fiction
- Publisher: Pocket Books
- Publication date: 1981
- Publication place: United States
- Media type: Print (paperback)
- Pages: 434
- ISBN: 0-671-42262-6
- Preceded by: The Best Science Fiction of the Year 9
- Followed by: The Best Science Fiction of the Year 11

The Best Science Fiction of the Year #10 is an anthology of science fiction short stories edited by Terry Carr, the tenth volume in a series of sixteen. It was first published in paperback by Pocket Books in July 1981, and in trade paperback and hardcover and trade paperback (the latter under the slightly variant title The Best Science Fiction of the Year: No. 10) by Gollancz in the same year.

The book collects twelve novellas, novelettes and short stories by various science fiction authors, with an introduction, notes and concluding essays by Carr and Charles N. Brown. The stories were previously published in 1980 in the magazines Analog Science Fiction/Science Fact, TriQuarterly, Playboy, The Magazine of Fantasy & Science Fiction, and Isaac Asimov's Science Fiction Magazine, and the anthologies New Voices III: The Campbell Award Nominees, Universe 10, Their Immortal Hearts, and Interfaces.

== Contents ==
- "Introduction" (Terry Carr)
- "Grotto of the Dancing Deer" (Clifford D. Simak)
- "Scorched Supper on New Niger" (Suzy McKee Charnas)
- "Ginungagap" (Michael Swanwick)
- "Frozen Journey" (Philip K. Dick)
- "The Ugly Chickens" (Howard Waldrop)
- "Nightflyers" (George R. R. Martin)
- "Beatnik Bayou" (John Varley)
- "Window" (Bob Leman)
- "Tell Us a Story" (Zenna Henderson)
- "Le Croix" (Barry N. Malzberg)
- "Martian Walkabout" (F. Gwynplaine MacIntyre)
- "Slow Music" (James Tiptree, Jr.)
- "Recommended Reading - 1980" (Terry Carr)
- "The Science Fiction Year" (Charles N. Brown)

== Awards ==
The anthology placed third in the 1982 Locus Poll Award for Best Anthology.

"Grotto of the Dancing Deer" won the 1980 Nebula Award for Best Short Story, the 1980 Analog Award for Best Short Story, and the 1981 Hugo Award for Best Short Story, and placed first in the 1981 Locus Poll Award for Best Short Story.

"Scorched Supper on New Niger" placed sixteenth in the 1981 Locus Poll Award for Best Novelette.

"Ginungagap" was nominated for the 1980 Nebula Award for Best Novelette and placed nineteenth in the 1981 Locus Poll Award for Best Novelette.

"Frozen Journey" placed eighth in the 1981 Locus Poll Award for Best Short Story.

"The Ugly Chickens" won the 1980 Nebula Award for Best Novelette and the 1981 World Fantasy Award for Best Short Fiction, was nominated for the 1981 Balrog Award for Best Short Fiction and the 1981 Hugo Award for Best Novelette, and placed fifth in the 1981 Locus Poll Award for Best Novelette.

"Nightflyers" won the 1980 Analog Award for Best Novella/Novelette, was nominated for the 1981 Hugo Award for Best Novella, and placed first in the 1981 Locus Poll Award for Best Novella.

"Beatnik Bayou" was nominated for the 1980 Nebula Award for Best Novelette and the 1981 Hugo Award for Best Novelette, and placed second in the 1981 Locus Poll Award for Best Novelette.

"Window" was nominated for the 1980 Nebula Award for Best Short Story and placed fourth in the 1981 Locus Poll Award for Best Short Story.

"Tell Us a Story" placed seventeenth in the 1981 Locus Poll Award for Best Novella.

"Le Croix" placed fourteenth in the 1981 Locus Poll Award for Best Novella.

"Slow Music" placed seventh in the 1981 Locus Poll Award for Best Novella.

== Reviews ==
The book was reviewed by Sławomir Kędzierski for the Polish magazine "Fantastyka" (2/83, p. 44-45).
