= World's Best Science Fiction =

World's Best Science Fiction edited by Donald A. Wollheim and Terry Carr, Ace Books.

World's Best Science Fiction was a series of annual paperback anthologies published by Ace Books from 1965 to 1971 under the editorship of Donald A. Wollheim and Terry Carr. Some volumes were also issued in hardcover through the Science Fiction Book Club or (in the United Kingdom) by Gollancz.

Each volume included the year of publication after the title, though when the first four volumes were subsequently reprinted the year designation was replaced by a numerical one (First through Fourth Series in place of 1965 to 1968).

Each annual volume reprinted what in the opinion of the editors were the best science fiction short stories appearing in the previous year. The series also aimed to discover and nurture new talent. It featured both occasionally recurring authors, and writers new to the science fiction genre.

After the editors left Ace, each separately edited a continuation series, Wollheim (with Arthur W. Saha) The Annual World’s Best SF (DAW Books, 1972–1990), and Carr The Best Science Fiction of the Year (Ballantine Books, 1972–1980, Pocket Books, 1981–1983, Baen Books, 1984, Tor Books, 1985–1987).

== The series ==
1. World's Best Science Fiction: 1965 (1965) = World's Best Science Fiction: First Series (1970)
2. World's Best Science Fiction: 1966 (1966) = World's Best Science Fiction: Second Series (1970)
3. World's Best Science Fiction: 1967 (1967) = World's Best Science Fiction: Third Series (1970)
4. World's Best Science Fiction: 1968 (1968) = World's Best Science Fiction: Fourth Series (1970)
5. World's Best Science Fiction: 1969 (1969)
6. World's Best Science Fiction: 1970 (1970)
7. World's Best Science Fiction: 1971 (1971)
