= James Benford =

American physicist

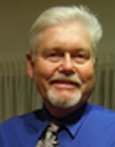
- Born: January 30, 1941 (age 85); Mobile, Alabama, U.S.
- Education: University of Oklahoma; University of California, San Diego
- Scientific career
- Fields: Physics

James Nelson Benford is an American physicist, High-Power Microwave (HPM) scientist, book author, science-fiction writer, and entrepreneur, best known for introducing novel technological concepts and conjectures related to the exploration of outer space, among these the design of laser-driven sailships, the possible use of co-orbital objects (moon, asteroids) by alien probes to spy on earth, and the appraisal of technical and safety issues associated with the Search for Extraterrestrial Intelligence (SETI). He was born in Mobile, Alabama in 1941, as was his twin brother, science-fiction author Greg Benford. He has two children, the eldest being Dominic Benford, Chief Technologist of Astrophysics at NASA and the Program Scientist for the Nancy Grace Roman Space Telescope.

== Education ==
Benford graduated with a BS in physics from the University of Oklahoma in 1963. He further obtained MS (1966), and Ph.D. (1969) degrees from the University of California at San Diego. He received scholarships from the OU Club of Dallas for undergraduate studies, and the Aerojet General Corporation for graduate studies.

== Career ==
While still a graduate student, Benford published his first research papers in the field of plasma physics. From 1969 to 1996 he worked in the Physics International (PI), (San Leandro, CA), initially as a research physicist, then advancing to executive positions, and founding its HPMi division in 1989, whose accomplishments included developing advanced HPM sources, building a large HPM experimental facility, beginning its HPM product line, and implementing program ORION, an important HPM system built to a design specification which arose within the UK. At PI Benford published research papers on particle beams, fusion, pulsed power and HPM, relativistic magnetron and virtual cathode oscillator (vircator) technology.

In 1996 he founded Microwave Sciences, Inc., (MS, Lafayette, California), where he remains as its president. At MS, his research interests have dealt with HPM systems design, HPM effects testing, and power beaming for space propulsion. Benford is a leader and consultant at Breakthrough Starshot, a research and engineering project aiming to send probes to the nearby stars within the long term. He was a contributor to the Encyclopedia of Applied Physics, in the subject of Intense Particle Beams. He has taught HPM courses worldwide. Videos covering Benford's work can be readily found on the internet.

=== Membership ===
He is a member of the American Physical Society. At IEEE he has been a member since 1970, and a Fellow since 1996. He is also an EMP Fellow of the Summa Foundation, University of New Mexico since 1998.

=== Editorial ===
With his twin brother Gregory Benford, he was a co-editor of Void, a science fiction fanzine published from 1955 to 1969. He was Guest Editor of the Special Issue on High Power Microwave Generation, IEEE Transactions on Plasma Sciences (vol 20, 1992), and an article reviewer for a number of scientific journals including Physical Review Letters, IEEE Transactions in Plasma Sciences, Journal of Applied Physics, Journal of the British Interplanetary Society and Applied Physics Letters.

== Works ==
=== Research papers ===
Benford has published over one hundred research papers in peer-reviewed sources. His most cited research papers are:

- Benford, J.; Sze, H.; Woo, W.; Smith, R. R.; Harteneck, B. (1989-02-20). "Phase Locking of Relativistic Magnetrons". Physical Review Letters. 62 (8): 969–971. doi:10.1103/PhysRevLett.62.969
- Benford, J.; Benford, G. (1997). "Survey of pulse shortening in high-power microwave sources". IEEE Transactions on Plasma Science. 25 (2): 311–317. doi:10.1109/27.602505. ISSN 1939-9375.
- Haworth, M.D.; Baca, G.; Benford, J.; Englert, T.; Hackett, K.; Hendricks, K.J.; Henley, D.; LaCour, M.; Lemke, R.W.; Price, D.; Ralph, D. (1998). "Significant pulse-lengthening in a multigigawatt magnetically insulated transmission line oscillator". IEEE Transactions on Plasma Science. 26 (3): 312–319. doi:10.1109/27.700759. ISSN 1939-9375
- Benford, James (2008). "Space Applications of High-Power Microwaves". IEEE Transactions on Plasma Science. 36 (3): 569–581. doi:10.1109/TPS.2008.923760. ISSN 1939-9375.
- Benford, James; Benford, Gregory; Benford, Dominic (2010). "Messaging with Cost-Optimized Interstellar Beacons". Astrobiology. 10 (5): 475–490. doi:10.1089/ast.2009.0393. ISSN 1531-1074.

=== Science fiction ===
His most recent science fiction writings are:

- A Science Critique of Aurora, Stephen Baxter, James Benford, and Joseph Miller, The New York Review of Science Fiction, pg. 12 September 2015.
- “Power Beaming Leakage Radiation as a SETI Observable”, James Benford and Dominic Benford, ApJ, pg. 825, 101 (2016).
- “Seeing Alien Tech”, James Benford and Dominic Benford, Analog, Vol. CXXXVIII, pg. 40–44, May/June (2018).

=== Books ===
- Benford, James; Benford, Gregory (2013). Starship Century: Toward the Grandest Horizon. Lucky Bat Books. ISBN 978-1-939051-29-5. OCLC 857646236.
- Benford, James; Swegle, John A.; Schamiloglu, Edl (2019). High Power Microwaves (3rd ed.). CRC Press. doi:10.1201/9781420012064. ISBN 978-0-367-87100-0. OCLC 1129817799. Cited 1727 times by 2022.

=== Patents and inventions ===
Benford has been awarded US invention patents for: Particle beam injection system(1974), and Systems and methods for generating high power, wideband microwave radiation using variable capacitance voltage multiplication (2007). He also invented a number of HPM devices including a Side-Extracted Vircator, a Cavity Vircator. and a High Power Vacuum Horn antenna.
