= Dream's Edge =

Anthology of short stories edited by Terry Carr

- First edition, cover art by Don Shields
- Editor: Terry Carr
- Genre: Science fiction short story collection
- Publisher: Sierra Club Books
- ISBN: 0-87156-238-3

Dream's Edge is an anthology of short science fiction stories about the "future of Planet Earth". It is edited by collector Terry Carr. It was published in 1980 by Sierra Club Books (San Francisco).

The short stories included are:

- "The Green Marauder", Larry Niven
- "East Wind, West Wind", Frank M. Robinson
- "People's Park", Charles Ott
- "Last Hund", Eric Vinicoff and Marcia Martin
- "Greenslaves", Frank Herbert
- "Encased in Ancient Rind", R. A. Lafferty
- "Occam's Scalpel", Theodore Sturgeon
- "The Spirit Who Bideth by Himself in the Land of Mist and Snow", Susan Janice Anderson
- "When Petals Fall", Sydney J. Van Scyoc
- "How Can We Sink When We Can Fly?" Alexei Panshin
- "Three Tinks on the House", F. M. Busby
- "Fortune Hunter", Poul Anderson
- "My Lady of the Psychiatric Sorrows", Brian W. Aldiss
- "The New Atlantis", Ursula K. Le Guin
- "Young Love", Grania Davis
- "Whale Song", Terry Melen
- "Under the Generator", John Shirley
- "The Ugly Chickens", Howard Waldrop
- "The Wind and the Rain", Robert Silverberg
- "Virra", Terry Carr
