= Darkchild (disambiguation) =

Darkchild (Rodney Jerkins, born 1977), is an American record producer, rapper, and songwriter.

Darkchild or similar terms may also refer to:

- Darkchild (novel), by Sydney J. Van Scyoc
- Magik, a Marvel Comics character, known as Darkchild, or (the) Darkchilde
- The Dark Child, an alternate title for Camara Laye's autobiographical French novel The African Child (French: L'Enfant noir)
- "Dark Child", an episode of the 1995 TV series The Outer Limits

== See also ==
- Darkchylde, a comic book character
