= Terry Carr's Best Science Fiction of the Year =

1985 anthology edited by Terry Carr

- Cover of first edition, 1985
- Editor: Terry Carr
- Language: English
- Series: The Best Science Fiction of the Year
- Genre: Science fiction
- Publisher: Tor Books
- Publication date: 1985
- Publication place: United States
- Media type: Print (paperback)
- Pages: 384
- ISBN: 0-8125-3273-2
- Preceded by: The Best Science Fiction of the Year 13
- Followed by: Terry Carr's Best Science Fiction of the Year 15

Terry Carr's Best Science Fiction of the Year is an anthology of science fiction short stories edited by Terry Carr, the fourteenth volume in a series of sixteen. It was first published in paperback by Tor Books in July 1985, and in hardcover and trade paperback by Gollancz in October of the same year, under the alternate title Best SF of the Year #14.

The book collects thirteen novellas, novelettes and short stories by various science fiction authors, with an introduction, notes and concluding essays by Carr and Charles N. Brown. The stories were previously published in 1984 in the magazines Isaac Asimov's Science Fiction Magazine, Analog Science Fiction and Fact, Omni, The Magazine of Fantasy & Science Fiction, and Interzone, and the anthologies Habitats, Universe 14, and Light Years and Dark: Science Fiction and Fantasy Of and For Our Time.

== Contents ==
- "Introduction" (Terry Carr)
- "Press Enter []" (John Varley)
- "Blued Moon" (Connie Willis)
- "Summer Solstice" (Charles L. Harness)
- "Morning Child" (Gardner Dozois)
- "The Aliens Who Knew, I Mean, Everything" (George Alec Effinger)
- "A Day in the Skin (or, The Century We Were Out of Them)" (Tanith Lee)
- "Instructions" (Bob Leman)
- "The Lucky Strike" (Kim Stanley Robinson)
- "Green Hearts" (Lee Montgomerie)
- "Bloodchild" (Octavia E. Butler)
- "Trojan Horse" (Michael Swanwick)
- "Fears" (Pamela Sargent)
- "Trinity" (Nancy Kress)
- "1984, the SF Year in Review" (Charles N. Brown)
- "Recommended Reading" (Terry Carr)

== Reception ==
Dave Langford reviewed Terry Carr's Best Science Fiction of the Year for White Dwarf #72, and stated that "I don't much like Varley's tale, whose flashy surface covers a thin and familiar technophobic theme. but most of the rest are ace stuff."

=== Awards ===
The anthology placed third in the 1986 Locus Poll Award for Best Anthology.

"Press Enter []" won the 1984 Nebula Award for Best Novella, the 1985 SF Chronicle Award for Best Novella, and the 1985 Hugo Award for Best Novella, and placed first in the 1985 Locus Poll Award for Best Novella.

"Blued Moon" was nominated for the 1985 Hugo Award for Best Novelette and placed third in the 1985 Locus Poll Award, Best Novelette.

"Summer Solstice" was nominated for the 1984 Analog Award for Best Novella/Novelette and the 1985 Hugo Award for Best Novella, and placed eighth in the 1985 Locus Poll Award for Best Novelette.

"Morning Child" won the 1984 Nebula Award for Best Short Story, was nominated for the 1985 SF Chronicle Award for Best Short Story, and placed twenty-second in the 1985 Locus Poll Award for Best Short Story.

"The Aliens Who Knew, I Mean, Everything" was nominated for the 1984 Nebula Award for Best Short Story, the 1985 SF Chronicle Award for Best Short Story, and the 1985 Hugo Award for Best Short Story, and placed third in the 1985 Locus Poll Award for Best Short Story.

"The Lucky Strike" was nominated for the 1984 Nebula Award for Best Novelette, the 1985 Hugo Award for Best Novelette, and the 1985 SF Chronicle Award for Best Novelette, and placed fourth in the 1985 Locus Poll Award for Best Novelette.

"Bloodchild" won the 1984 Nebula Award for Best Novelette, the 1985 SF Chronicle Award for Best Novelette, and the 1985 Hugo Award for Best Novelette, and placed first in the 1985 Locus Poll Award for Best Novelette.

"Trojan Horse" was nominated for the 1984 Nebula Award for Best Novelette and placed thirteenth in the 1985 Locus Poll Award for Best Novelette.

"Fears" placed eighteenth in the 1985 Locus Poll Award for Best Short Story.

"Trinity" was nominated for the 1984 Nebula Award for Best Novella and the 1985 SF Chronicle Award for Best Novella, placed sixth in the 1985 Locus Poll Award for Best Novella, and was a preliminary nominee for the 1986 Prometheus Award for Best Libertarian SF Novel.
