= I Hope I Shall Arrive Soon (collection) =

1985 book by American writer Philip K. Dick

- Dust-jacket from the first edition
- Author: Philip K. Dick
- Language: English
- Genre: Science fiction
- Publisher: Doubleday
- Publication date: 1985
- Publication place: United States
- Media type: Print (hardback)
- Pages: 179
- ISBN: 0-385-19567-2
- OCLC: 11574322
- Dewey Decimal: 813/.54 19
- LC Class: PS3554.I3 I2 1985

I Hope I Shall Arrive Soon is a book by American writer Philip K. Dick, a collection of 10 science fiction short stories and one essay. It was first published by Doubleday in 1985 and was edited by Mark Hurst and Paul Williams. Many of the stories had originally appeared in the magazines Fantasy and Science Fiction, Worlds of Tomorrow, Amazing Stories, Interzone, Rolling Stone College Papers, The Yuba City High Times, Omni and Playboy.

== Contents ==
- "How to Build a Universe That Doesn't Fall Apart Two Days Later"
- "The Short Happy Life of the Brown Oxford"
- "Explorers We"
- "Holy Quarrel"
- "What'll We Do with Ragland Park?"
- "Strange Memories of Death"
- "The Alien Mind"
- "The Exit Door Leads In"
- "Chains of Air, Web of Aether"
- "Rautavaara's Case"
- "I Hope I Shall Arrive Soon"

== Reception ==
Dave Langford reviewed I Hope I Shall Arrive Soon for White Dwarf #75, and stated that "There may be no more Dick collections, so bag this one."

== Reviews ==
- Review by E. F. Bleiler (1985) in Fantasy Review, July 1985
- Review by Debbie Notkin (1985) in Locus, #295 August 1985
- Review by Don D'Ammassa (1985) in Science Fiction Chronicle, #73 October 1985
- Review by L. J. Hurst (1986) in Vector 131
- Review by Andrew Andrews (1986) in Science Fiction Review, Fall 1986

== Sources ==
- "Internet Speculative Fiction Database".
- Brown, Charles N.; William G. Contento. "The Locus Index to Science Fiction (1984-1998)".
