= World's Best Science Fiction: 1971 =

1971 anthology edited by Donald A. Wollheim and Terry Carr

- Cover of first edition, 1971
- Editors: Donald A. Wollheim and Terry Carr
- Cover artist: Davis Meltzer
- Language: English
- Series: World's Best Science Fiction
- Genre: Science fiction
- Publisher: Ace Books
- Publication date: 1971
- Publication place: United States
- Media type: Print (paperback)
- Pages: 349
- Preceded by: World's Best Science Fiction: 1970
- Followed by: The 1972 Annual World's Best SF; The Best Science Fiction of the Year

World's Best Science Fiction: 1971 is an anthology of science fiction short stories edited by Donald A. Wollheim and Terry Carr, the seventh volume in a series of seven. It was first published in paperback by Ace Books in 1971, followed by a hardcover edition issued in September of the same year by the same publisher as a selection of the Science Fiction Book Club. It was followed in 1972 by The 1972 Annual World's Best SF, edited by Wollheim, and The Best Science Fiction of the Year, edited by Carr, the first volumes of two separate successor series,

The book collects fifteen novelettes and short stories by various science fiction authors, with an introduction by the editors. Most of the stories were previously published in 1970 in the magazines Galaxy Magazine, The Magazine of Fantasy & Science Fiction, Amazing Science Fiction, If, Worlds of Tomorrow, and Fantastic, the anthologies Orbit 7 and Quark/1, and the collection Parsecs and Parables. One piece ("The Last Time Around") had also been previously published in 1968 in the United Kingdom in the anthology New Writings in SF 12.

== Contents ==
- "Introduction" (Donald A. Wollheim and Terry Carr)
- "Slow Sculpture" (Theodore Sturgeon)
- "Bird in the Hand" (Larry Niven)
- "Ishmael in Love" (Robert Silverberg)
- "Invasion of Privacy" (Bob Shaw)
- "Waterclap" (Isaac Asimov)
- "Continued on Next Rock" (R. A. Lafferty)
- "The Thing in the Stone" (Clifford D. Simak)
- "Nobody Lives on Burton Street" (Greg Benford)
- "Whatever Became of the McGowans?" (Michael G. Coney)
- "The Last Time Around" (Arthur Sellings)
- "Greyspun's Gift" (Neal Barrett, Jr.)
- "The Shaker Revival" (Gerald Jonas)
- "Dear Aunt Annie" (Gordon Eklund)
- "Confessions" (Ron Goulart)
- "Gone Are the Lupo" (H. B. Hickey)

== Awards ==
"Slow Sculpture" won the 1970 Nebula Award for Best Novelette and the 1971 Hugo Award for Best Short Story, and placed sixth in the 1971 Locus Poll Award for Best Short Fiction.

"Continued on Next Rock" was nominated for the 1970 Nebula Award for Best Novelette, the 1971 Hugo Award for Best Short Story, and the 1972 Ditmar Award for Best International Long Fiction, and placed third in the 1971 Locus Poll Award for Best Short Fiction.

"The Thing in the Stone" was nominated for the 1970 Nebula Award for Best Novella and the 1971 Hugo Award for Best Novella.

"Shaker Revival" was nominated for the 1970 Nebula Award for Best Novelette.

"Dear Aunt Annie" was nominated for the 1970 Nebula Award for Best Novelette and placed tenth in the 1971 Locus Poll Award for Best Short Fiction.
