= The Morphology of the Kirkham Wreck =

1978 science fiction short story by Hilbert Schenck

"The Morphology of the Kirkham Wreck" is a 1978 science fiction short story by American writer Hilbert Schenck. It was first published in the Magazine of Fantasy & Science Fiction.

== Plot summary ==
Schenck retells the true story of how lighthouse-keeper Walter Chase led the rescue of the crew of the H.P. Kirkham off Nantucket in 1892, and posits that many of the events during the rescue were the result of Chase unconsciously altering history.

== Reception ==
Terry Carr selected "The Morphology of the Kirkham Wreck" for inclusion in The Best Science Fiction of the Year 8; there, John Clute declared it to be one of the "three best selections", noting its "tone of intense reportorial objectivity." David G. Hartwell cited it as an example of hard science fiction, observing that it provides "information about hurricanes". It took fourteenth place in the 1979 Locus Award for Best Novelette.
