= World's Best Science Fiction: 1969 =

1969 anthology edited by Donald A. Wollheim and Terry Carr

- Cover of first edition, 1969
- Editors: Donald A. Wollheim and Terry Carr
- Cover artist: John Schoenherr
- Language: English
- Series: World's Best Science Fiction
- Genre: Science fiction
- Publisher: Ace Books
- Publication date: 1969
- Publication place: United States
- Media type: Print (paperback)
- Pages: 280
- Preceded by: World's Best Science Fiction: 1968
- Followed by: World's Best Science Fiction: 1970

World's Best Science Fiction: 1969 is an anthology of science fiction short stories edited by Donald A. Wollheim and Terry Carr, the fifth volume in a series of seven. It was first published in paperback by Ace Books in 1969, followed by a hardcover edition issued in September of the same year by the same publisher as a selection of the Science Fiction Book Club.

The book collects nineteen novelettes and short stories by various science fiction authors, with an introduction by the editors. The stories were previously published in 1968 in the magazines Galaxy Magazine, The Magazine of Fantasy & Science Fiction, Playboy, New Worlds, Amazing Stories, If, and Analog Science Fiction -> Science Fact; and the anthologies The Farthest Reaches and New Writings in SF 12.

== Contents ==
- "Introduction" (Donald A. Wollheim and Terry Carr)
- "Street of Dreams, Feet of Clay" (Robert Sheckley) (Originally published in 1967)
- "Backtracked" (Burt Filer)
- "Kyrie" (Poul Anderson)
- "Going Down Smooth" (Robert Silverberg)
- "The Worm That Flies" (Brian W. Aldiss)
- "Masks" (Damon Knight)
- "Time Considered as a Helix of Semi-Precious Stones" (Samuel R. Delany)
- "HEMEAC" (E. G. Von Wald)
- "The Cloudbuilders" (Colin Kapp)
- "This Grand Carcass" (R. A. Lafferty)
- "A Visit to Cleveland General" (Sydney Van Scyoc)
- "The Selchey Kids" (Laurence Yep)
- "Welcome to the Monkey House" (Kurt Vonnegut, Jr.)
- "The Dance of the Changer and the Three" (Terry Carr)
- "Sword Game" (H. H. Hollis)
- "Total Environment" (Brian W. Aldiss)
- "The Square Root of Brain" (Fritz Leiber)
- "Starsong" (Fred Saberhagen)
- "Fear Hound" (Katherine MacLean)

== Awards ==
"Kyrie" was nominated for the 1968 Nebula Award for Best Short Story.

"Masks" was nominated for the 1968 Nebula Award for Best Short Story and the 1969 Hugo Award for Best Short Story.

"Time Considered as a Helix of Semi-Precious Stones Nebula Award won the 1969 Nebula Award for Best Novelette and the 1970 Hugo Award for Best Short Story.

"The Dance of the Changer and the Three" was nominated for the 1968 Nebula Award for Best Short Story and the 1969 Hugo Award for Best Short Story.

"Total Environment" was nominated for the 1968 Nebula Award for Best Novelette and the 1969 Hugo Award for Best Novelette.
