= The Best Science Fiction of the Year 13 =

1984 anthology edited by Terry Carr

The Best Science Fiction of the Year #13
- Cover of first edition, 1984
- Editor: Terry Carr
- Language: English
- Series: The Best Science Fiction of the Year
- Genre: Science fiction
- Publisher: Baen Books
- Publication date: 1984
- Publication place: United States
- Media type: Print (paperback)
- Pages: 384 p
- ISBN: 0-671-55901-X
- Preceded by: The Best Science Fiction of the Year 12
- Followed by: Terry Carr's Best Science Fiction of the Year

The Best Science Fiction of the Year #13 is an anthology of science fiction short stories edited by Terry Carr, the thirteenth volume in a series of sixteen. It was first published in paperback by Baen Books in July 1984, and in hardcover and trade paperback by Gollancz in December of the same year.

The book collects ten novellas, novelettes and short stories by various science fiction authors, with an introduction, notes and concluding essays by Carr and Charles N. Brown. With one exception, the stories were originally published in 1983 in the magazines Analog Science Fiction/Science Fact, The Magazine of Fantasy & Science Fiction, Isaac Asimov's Science Fiction Magazine, Omni, and Interzone, and the anthology Universe 13. The exception is "Scenes from the Country of the Blind," which originally appeared in the British anthology A Book of Contemporary Nightmares in 1977. Its inclusion in Carr's best of the year anthology for 1983 stemmed from its first American publication that year in Isaac Asimov's Science Fiction Magazine.

== Contents ==
- "Introduction" (Terry Carr)
- "Servant of the People" (Frederik Pohl)
- "Slow Birds" (Ian Watson)
- "The Sidon in the Mirror" (Connie Willis)
- "Hardfought" (Greg Bear)
- "Amanda and the Alien" (Robert Silverberg)
- "Kaleidoscope" (Cherry Wilder)
- "The Tithonian Factor" (Richard Cowper)
- "Blind Shemmy" (Jack Dann)
- "Scenes from the Country of the Blind" (John Sladek)
- "Her Habiline Husband" (Michael Bishop)
- "The Science Fiction Year" (Charles N. Brown)
- "Recommended Reading" (Terry Carr)

== Reception ==
Dave Langford reviewed The Best Science Fiction of the Year 13 for White Dwarf #61, and stated that "Most stories were shortlisted for major awards. No duds: Carr's good taste can be trusted. Worth a look."

=== Awards ===
The anthology placed third in the 1985 Locus Poll Award for Best Anthology.

"Servant of the People" was nominated for the 1984 Hugo Award for Best Short Story and placed fourth in the 1984 Locus Poll Award for Best Short Story.

"Slow Birds" was nominated for the 1983 Nebula Award for Best Novelette and the 1984 Hugo Award for Best Novelette, and placed third in the 1984 Locus Poll Award for Best Novelette.

"The Sidon in the Mirror" was nominated for the 1983 Nebula Award for Best Novelette and the 1984 Hugo Award for Best Novelette, and placed sixth in the 1984 Locus Poll Award for Best Novelette.

"Hardfought" won the 1983 Nebula Award for Best Novella, was nominated for the 1984 Hugo Award for Best Novella and the 1984 SF Chronicle Award for Best Novella, and placed fifth in the 1984 Locus Poll Award for Best Novella.

"Amanda and the Alien" placed eleventh in the 1984 Locus Poll Award for Best Short Story.

"The Tithonian Factor" was nominated for the 1983 British Science Fiction Award for Short Fiction.

"Blind Shemmy" was nominated for the 1983 Nebula Award for Best Novelette and the 1984 SF Chronicle Award for Best Novelette, and placed thirteenth in the 1984 Locus Poll Award for Best Novelette.

"Her Habiline Husband" was nominated for the 1983 Nebula Award for Best Novella, won the 1984 SF Chronicle Award for Best Novella, and placed first in the 1984 Locus Poll Award for Best Novella.
