= Assignment Nor'Dyren =

1973 novel by Sydney J. Van Scyoc

- Author: Sydney J. Van Scyoc
- Language: English
- Genre: Science fiction novel
- Published: 1973
- Publication place: United States

Assignment Nor'Dyren is a 1973 science fiction novel by American writer Sydney J. Van Scyoc. It deals with an imagined world, Nor'Dyren, where an alien human-like species has a more structured social system than is the case for human society. When humans come to Nor'Dyren, they discover that there are three specialized types of Nor'Dyrenese.

This three-way division of labor does not seem to be working. Nobody on Nor'Dyren knows how to repair broken machines. Nobody ever creates anything new. Archeological investigation reveals that the world Nor'Dyren has been in decline for 200 years from its cultural and technological apex.

== Plot details ==
Eventually, the humans who are visiting Nor'Dyren discover that until 200 years previously, there were four distinct groups of Nor'Dyrenese. The fourth group (Qattagon) had been specialized to perform all of the creative work of society and was very artistic. However, the Qattagon had gotten too wild and radical and had come into conflict with the Gonnegon. This conflict ended when the administrative Gonnegon engineered the Qattagon out of the social system. This was possible because the Qattagon were not capable of reproducing; Qattagon were the result of interbreeding among the other three groups. To engineer Qattagon out of the society, the administrators decreed that members of each of the other three groups could only mate with other members of their own group. Under this imposed rule, none of the artistic hybrid Qattagon were born anymore.

The reason that the Qattagon had gotten out of control and become a problem for Nor'Dyren was because the balance between the four groups had been engineered to be appropriate for worlds that were part of a large interstellar empire. But in the distant past, that empire had collapsed, leaving the planet Nor'Dyren isolated and unable to absorb the full force of the creativity of its Qattagon.

== Implications for human society ==
Assignment Nor'Dyren is a mystery novel set on an interesting alien world, but it also leads the reader to think about some issues that are important on Earth.

=== Genetic engineering of the human species ===
One of the technical issues raised by this book concerns genetic engineering. The Allegon, Berregon, Gonnegon and Qattagon appear to be the result of genetic engineering, four specialized variations of the original species, designed so as to form a stable social system. On Earth, humans now have the technology for genetically modifying our own species. We are also starting to explore space and confronting the problem of how to deal with the changes that come with science and technology.

=== Homosexuality and creativity ===
A major social issue raised by this book is the relationship between creativity and human homosexuality. The possibility of a link between homosexuality and creativity has been a matter of debate for many years.

Some view the idea of a link between creativity and homosexuality as a myth while at the same time taking note of the impact that homosexuals have on society:

Any individual that truly appreciates the arts cannot help but appreciate the contributions of homosexual artists to the field. It appears that the link between homosexuality and creativity is less a function of genetic selection, and more a product of societal pressures and approvals.

Research into possible differences in the brain that might be linked to homosexuality continues at a slow pace and remains fairly primitive.

The hypothesis that homosexuality can be associated with certain behavioral traits such as creativity remains a topic for further research.

== Book details ==
- Assignment Nor'Dyren. New York, N.Y: Avon books. 1977. ISBN 978-0-380-17160-6.
