= World's Best Science Fiction: 1968 =

1968 anthology edited by Donald A. Wollheim and Terry Carr

- Cover of first edition, 1968
- Editors: Donald A. Wollheim and Terry Carr
- Cover artist: Jack Gaughan
- Language: English
- Series: World's Best Science Fiction
- Genre: Science fiction
- Publisher: Ace Books
- Publication date: 1968
- Publication place: United States
- Media type: Print (paperback)
- Pages: 319
- Preceded by: World's Best Science Fiction: 1967
- Followed by: World's Best Science Fiction: 1969

World's Best Science Fiction: 1968 is an anthology of science fiction short stories edited by Donald A. Wollheim and Terry Carr, the fourth volume in a series of seven. It was first published in paperback by Ace Books in 1968. It was reprinted by the same publisher in 1970 under the alternate title World's Best Science Fiction: Fourth Series. The first hardcover edition was published by Gollancz in 1969.

The book collects sixteen novellas, novelettes and short stories by various science fiction authors, with an introduction by the editors. The stories were previously published in 1967 in the magazines SF Impulse, If, Analog Science Fiction -> Science Fact; Magazine of Horror, Galaxy Magazine, The Magazine of Fantasy & Science Fiction, and New Worlds, and the anthology Orbit 2.

== Contents ==
- "Introduction" (Donald A. Wollheim and Terry Carr)
- "See Me Not" (Richard Wilson)
- "Driftglass" (Samuel R. Delany)
- "Ambassador to Verdammt" (Colin Kapp)
- "The Man Who Never Was" (R. A. Lafferty)
- "The Billiard Ball" (Isaac Asimov)
- "Hawksbill Station" (Robert Silverberg)
- "The Number You Have Reached" (Thomas M. Disch)
- "The Man Who Loved the Faioli" (Roger Zelazny)
- "Population Implosion" (Andrew J. Offutt)
- "I Have No Mouth, and I Must Scream" (Harlan Ellison)
- "The Sword Swallower" (Ron Goulart)
- "Coranda" (Keith Roberts)
- "Thus We Frustrate Charlemagne" (R. A. Lafferty)
- "Handicap" (Larry Niven)
- "Full Sun" (Brian W. Aldiss)
- "It's Smart to Have an English Address" (D. G. Compton)

== Awards ==
"Driftglass" was nominated for the 1967 Nebula Award for Best Short Story.

"Hawksbill Station" was nominated for the 1967 Nebula Award for Best Novella and the 1968 Hugo Award for Best Novella.

"I Have No Mouth, and I Must Scream" won the 1968 Hugo Award for Best Short Story.
