= In the Ocean of Night =

1977 novel by Gregory Benford

- Cover of first edition (hardcover)
- Author: Gregory Benford
- Cover artist: Larry Kresek
- Language: English
- Series: Galactic Center Saga
- Genre: Hard science fiction
- Published: Oct 1977 (Dial Press/Quantum)
- Publication place: United States
- Media type: Print (hardback & paperback)
- Pages: 276
- ISBN: 0-8037-4218-5
- OCLC: 3311898
- Dewey Decimal: 813/.5/4
- LC Class: PZ4.B4587 In PS3552.E542
- Followed by: Across the Sea of Suns

In the Ocean of Night is a 1977 fix-up hard science fiction novel by American writer Gregory Benford. It is the first novel in his Galactic Center Saga. It was nominated for the Nebula Award for Best Novel in 1977, and for the Locus Award the following year. In the Ocean of Night was first published as a series of novellas and novelettes from 1973 to 1977.

== Plot summary ==
In 1999 (2019 in the second edition), Nigel Walmsley, a British scientist and astronaut for NASA, was sent to attach a thermonuclear bomb to a comet named Icarus which is on a direct collision course for India. Icarus turns out to be large, solid, and made of a nickel-iron composite. Nigel is instructed to plant the weapon and leave so it can be detonated. He persuades Mission Control to let him put it in a large fissure he discovered, so it would be even more effective.

In the fissure, Nigel discovers strips of metal worked in obviously artificial patterns. Awestruck at this evidence of extraterrestrial intelligent life, Nigel begins exploring. Icarus is made up of a number of hollow shells, making the asteroid's mass far less than predicted. NASA insists that the demolition has to go forward, claiming Icarus would skip off the atmosphere and land in the Indian Ocean, causing widespread damage from the resultant tsunami. Nigel realizes this is a lie, and convinces his partner of that. They hide the nuke and spend the next week retrieving artifacts and materials before detonating the bomb.

15 years after their discovery the Icarus artifacts have yielded little, and Nigel's delayed detonation of Icarus has alienated him from NASA and other people. Nigel's partner, Alexandria, dies from systemic lupus erythematosus, a disease caused by pollution. An anomaly near Jupiter distracts Nigel: something, nicknamed 'the Snark', is repeating radio broadcasts. The anomaly fires its fusion engines and reveals itself to the satellites around Jupiter. As a probe vessel, the Snark's directing computer could not afford to ignore the satellites' radio emissions before it moved on to Earth.

Eventually the JPL team locates the Snark around Venus. Nigel hijacks the communications, transmitting his own signal to the Snark. The Snark receives the signal as a sign of non-hostile intentions and transmits back. It also reaches out through Nigel's medical implants to his dead partner's more elaborate ones, and commandeers her body to explore and learn about Earth. The initial tentative transmissions blossom into a largely one-way torrent of information for the Snark. One day, it asks to visit Earth. A compromise is worked out: the Snark will orbit the Moon until trust is built up. As Nigel is already fully informed, he is assigned to pilot the space ship (armed with another nuke) and meet the Snark.

Nigel meets the Snark, which disables Nigel's conventional weapons and begins talking to him. It says that organic civilizations and species are inherently unstable; they flash brilliantly and commit suicide sooner or later. The autonomous machines they craft live on long after them, going on and evolving. But they cannot truly compete with the organics, who live "in the universe of essences". That is the reason for the Great Silence. Nigel's superiors order him to use the nuclear weapon, but he refuses. They override him and fire it anyway but the Snark flees the Solar System faster than the missile can follow. The decision to fire is covered up, but Nigel blackmails NASA into letting him go to the Moon; the Snark had directed a transmission at Mare Marginis for unknown parties, and Nigel wanted to find those parties.

Four years later, Nigel is now based on the Moon. A fellow astronaut, Nikka, is involved in a crash that accidentally discovers a still active alien spacecraft wreck in the Moon's Mare Marginis – a spacecraft suspiciously armed with a once-powerful anti-spacecraft weapon. Nigel and Nikka explore the wreck, and find a functioning computer with a direct neural interface. Nigel and several others experiment with the computer's neural hook-up, and leave fundamentally changed by it, while the computer becomes inert and unable to reveal any more about its creators. Meanwhile, on Earth, some surprising experiments in human genetics conducted by the aliens are discovered alive in North America.
