= The Best Science Fiction of the Year 1 =

1972 anthology of science fiction short stories edited by Terry Carr

The Best Science Fiction of the Year
- Cover of first edition, 1972
- Author: edited by Terry Carr
- Cover artist: Chris Foss
- Language: English
- Series: The Best Science Fiction of the Year
- Genre: Science fiction
- Publisher: Ballantine Books
- Publication date: 1972
- Publication place: United States
- Media type: Print (paperback)
- Pages: 340
- Preceded by: World's Best Science Fiction: 1971
- Followed by: The Best Science Fiction of the Year 2

The Best Science Fiction of the Year 1 is an anthology of science fiction short stories edited by Terry Carr, the initial volume in a series of sixteen. It was one of two follow-up volumes to the previous year's World's Best Science Fiction: 1971 edited by Carr in collaboration with Donald A. Wollheim for Ace Books, the other being Wollheim's The 1972 Annual World's Best SF, edited by Wollheim and Arthur W. Saha. The Carr title was first published in paperback as The Best Science Fiction of the Year by Ballantine Books in July 1972. It was reissued by Ballantine in April 1976 as The Best Science Fiction of the Year #1, in keeping with the numerical designations of subsequent volumes in the series.

The book collects eleven novellas, novelettes and short stories by various science fiction authors, with an introduction by Carr. Most of the stories were previously published in 1971 in the magazines If, The Magazine of Fantasy & Science Fiction, and Playboy, and the anthologies Infinity Two, New Dimensions 1, Four Futures, New Worlds Quarterly 2, Universe 1, and Quark/4.

== Contents ==
- "Introduction" (Terry Carr)
- "Occam's Scalpel" (Theodore Sturgeon)
- "The Queen of Air and Darkness" (Poul Anderson)
- "In Entropy's Jaws" (Robert Silverberg)
- "The Sliced-Crosswise Only-On-Tuesday World" (Philip José Farmer)
- "A Meeting With Medusa" (Arthur C. Clarke)
- "The Frayed String on the Stretched Forefinger of Time" (Lloyd Biggle, Jr.)
- "How Can We Sink When We Can Fly?" (Alexei Panshin)
- "No Direction Home" (Norman Spinrad)
- "Vaster Than Empires and More Slow" (Ursula K. Le Guin)
- "All the Last Wars at Once" (George Alec Effinger)
- "The Fourth Profession" (Larry Niven)

== Awards ==
"The Queen of Air and Darkness" won the 1971 Nebula Award for Best Novelette and the 1972 Hugo Award for Best Novella, and placed first in the 1972 Locus Poll Award for Best Short Fiction.

"A Meeting with Medusa" won the 1972 Nebula Award for Best Novella, was nominated for the 1972 Hugo Award for Best Novella, and placed second in the 1972 Locus Poll Award for Best Short Fiction.

"Vaster Than Empires and More Slow" was nominated for the 1972 Hugo Award for Best Short Story, and placed 14th in the 1972 Locus Poll Award for Best Short Fiction.

"All the Last Wars at Once" was nominated for the 1972 Hugo Award for Best Short Story and placed second in the 1972 Locus Poll Award for Best Short Fiction.

"The Fourth Profession" was nominated for the 1972 Hugo Award for Best Novella.
