= World's Best Science Fiction: 1970 =

1970 anthology edited by Donald A. Wollheim and Terry Carr

- Cover of first edition, 1970
- Editors: Donald A. Wollheim and Terry Carr
- Cover artist: John Schoenherr
- Language: English
- Series: World's Best Science Fiction
- Genre: Science fiction
- Publisher: Ace Books
- Publication date: 1970
- Publication place: United States
- Media type: Print (paperback)
- Pages: 349
- Preceded by: World's Best Science Fiction: 1969
- Followed by: World's Best Science Fiction: 1971

World's Best Science Fiction: 1970 is an anthology of science fiction short stories edited by Donald A. Wollheim and Terry Carr, the sixth volume in a series of seven. It was first published in paperback by Ace Books in 1970, followed by a hardcover edition issued in September of the same year by the same publisher as a selection of the Science Fiction Book Club and a British hardcover edition issued in November of the same year by Gollancz.

The book collects thirteen novellas, novelettes and short stories by various science fiction authors, with an introduction by the editors. The stories were previously published in 1969 in the magazines Galaxy Magazine, The Magazine of Fantasy & Science Fiction, Analog Science Fiction/Science Fact; Vision of Tomorrow, New Worlds, If, and Playboy, and the anthologies Tomorrow's Worlds, New Writings in SF 15 and Orbit 5.

== Contents ==
- "Introduction" (Donald A. Wollheim and Terry Carr)
- "A Man Spekith" (Richard Wilson)
- "After the Myths Went Home" (Robert Silverberg)
- "Death by Ecstasy" (Larry Niven)
- "One Sunday in Neptune" (Alexei Panshin)
- "For the Sake of Grace" (Suzette Haden Elgin)
- "Your Haploid Heart" (James Tiptree, Jr.)
- "Therapy 2000" (Keith Roberts)
- "Sixth Sense" (Michael G. Coney)
- "A Boy and His Dog" (Harlan Ellison)
- "And So Say All of Us" (Bruce McAllister)
- "Ship of Shadows" (Fritz Leiber)
- "Nine Lives" (Ursula K. Le Guin)
- "The Big Flash" (Norman Spinrad)

== Awards ==
The anthology placed fourth in the 1970 Locus Poll Award for Best Anthology/Collection.

"A Boy and His Dog" won the 1969 Nebula Award for Best Novella and was nominated for the 1970 Hugo Award for Best Novella.

"Ship of Shadows" was nominated for the 1969 Nebula Award for Best Novella and won the 1970 Hugo Award for Best Novella.

"Nine Lives" was nominated for the 1969 Nebula Award for Best Novelette.

"The Big Flash" was nominated for the 1969 Nebula Award for Best Novelette.
