= The Exit Door Leads In =

- Short story by Philip K. Dick
- Country: United States
- Language: English
- Genre: Science-fiction

Publication
- Published in: Rolling Stone College Papers
- Publication type: Magazine
- Publication date: 1979

"The Exit Door Leads In" is a science fiction short story by American writer Philip K. Dick. First published in 1979.

"The Exit Door Leads In" was written for Rolling Stone College Papers, a short-lived publication. It is one of Dick's few stories created at the request of editors. It was reprinted in Terry Carr's The Best Science Fiction of the year #9.

== Plot summary ==
Bob Bibleman is tricked into enrolling in a military college, where his accidental discovery of classified information presents him with a moral quandary.

== Release ==
"The Exit Door Leads In" was first published in the inaugural issue of Rolling Stone College Papers in 1979. The following year it was reprinted in the ninth volume of the anthology series The Best Science Fiction of the Year. It has been included in several collections of Dick's work, including the 1984 Robots, Androids, and Mechanical Oddities and 1985 I Hope I Shall Arrive Soon. The short story has been translated into French, Dutch, Italian, German, and Japanese.

== Themes ==
Philip K. Dick has stated that the short story "expresses some basic beliefs" that he has concerning authority.

== Reception ==
Samuel J. Umland noted that the use of the phrase "I won't come off" marked "how the stain of Cartesian subjectivity remains forever with us, forever inscribing an "it" that reflection cannot confirm." Eric Beck remarked in Philip K. Dick and Philosophy: Do Androids Have Kindred Spirits? that the main character of Bob is indicative of Dick's prevalence of having his character being "the problem" for their respective stories, while Matt Englund has noted that the short story is a "crucial example" of how reading makes readers "the final cause of not only the world’s but for its existence".

David Langford has described "The Exit Door Leads In" as "very funny and utopian".
