= World's Best Science Fiction: 1965 =

1965 anthology edited by Donald A. Wollheim and Terry Carr

- Cover of first edition, 1965
- Author: edited by Donald A. Wollheim and Terry Carr
- Language: English
- Series: World's Best Science Fiction
- Genre: Science fiction
- Publisher: Ace Books
- Publication date: 1965
- Publication place: United States
- Media type: Print (paperback)
- Pages: 288 pp.
- Followed by: World's Best Science Fiction: 1966

World's Best Science Fiction: 1965 is an anthology of science fiction short stories edited by Donald A. Wollheim and Terry Carr, the first volume in a series of seven. It was first published in paperback by Ace Books in 1965. It was reprinted by the same publisher in 1970 under the alternate title World's Best Science Fiction: First Series.

The book collects seventeen novelettes and short stories by various science fiction authors, with an introduction by the editors. Most of the stories were previously published in 1964 in the magazines The Magazine of Fantasy & Science Fiction, Galaxy Magazine, Analog Science Fact -> Science Fiction, Amazing Stories, New Worlds SF, and If, and the collection Vampires, Ltd.; one or two others were published for the first time in the collection.

== Contents ==
- "Introduction" (Donald A. Wollheim and Terry Carr)
- "Greenplace" (Tom Purdom)
- "Men of Good Will" (Ben Bova and Myron R. Lewis)
- "Bill for Delivery" (Christopher Anvil)
- "Four Brands of Impossible" (Norman Kagan)
- "A Niche in Time" (William F. Temple)
- "Sea Wrack" (Edward Jesby)
- "For Every Action" (C. C. MacApp)
- "Vampires Ltd." (Josef Nesvadba) (Originally published in Czech in 1962)
- "The Last Lonely Man" (John Brunner)
- "The Star Party" (Robert Lory)
- "The Weather in the Underworld" (Colin Free)
- "Oh, to Be a Blobel!" (Philip K. Dick)
- "The Unremembered" (Edward Mackin)
- "What Happened to Sergeant Masuro?" (Harry Mulisch) (Originally published in Dutch in 1957)
- "Now Is Forever" (Thomas M. Disch)
- "The Competitors" (Jack B. Lawson)
- "When the Change-Winds Blow" (Fritz Leiber)
