= World's Best Science Fiction: 1967 =

1967 anthology edited by Donald A. Wollheim and Terry Carr

- Cover of first edition, 1967
- Editors: Donald A. Wollheim and Terry Carr
- Cover artist: Jack Gaughan
- Language: English
- Series: World's Best Science Fiction
- Genre: Science fiction
- Publisher: Ace Books
- Publication date: 1967
- Publication place: United States
- Media type: Print (paperback)
- Pages: 285
- Preceded by: World's Best Science Fiction: 1966
- Followed by: World's Best Science Fiction: 1968

World's Best Science Fiction: 1967 is an anthology of science fiction short stories edited by Donald A. Wollheim and Terry Carr, the third volume in a series of seven. It was first published in paperback by Ace Books in 1967. It was reprinted by the same publisher in 1970 under the alternate title World's Best Science Fiction: Third Series.

The book collects twelve novellas, novelettes and short stories by various science fiction authors, with an introduction by the editors. The stories were previously published in 1966 in the magazines The Magazine of Fantasy & Science Fiction, Analog Science Fiction -> Science Fact; New Worlds, If, Rogue, and Analog Science Fact -> Science Fiction.

== Contents ==
- "Introduction" (Donald A. Wollheim and Terry Carr)
- "We Can Remember It for You Wholesale" (Philip K. Dick)
- "Light of Other Days" (Bob Shaw)
- "The Keys to December" (Roger Zelazny)
- "Nine Hundred Grandmothers" (R. A. Lafferty)
- "Bircher" (A. A. Walde)
- "Behold the Man" (Michael Moorcock)
- "Bumberboom" (Avram Davidson)
- "Day Million" (Frederik Pohl)
- "The Wings of a Bat" (Paul Ash)
- "The Man from When" (Dannie Plachta)
- "Amen and Out" (Brian W. Aldiss)
- "For a Breath I Tarry" (Roger Zelazny)

== Awards ==
"We Can Remember It for You Wholesale" made the first ballot of the 1966 Nebula Award for Best Short Story.

"Light of Other Days" was nominated for the 1966 Nebula Award for Best Short Story and the 1967 Hugo Award for Best Short Story.

"The Keys to December" was nominated for the 1967 Nebula Award for Best Novelette.

"Behold the Man" won the 1967 Nebula Award for Best Novella.

"For a Breath I Tarry" made the first ballot of the 1966 Nebula Award for Best Novelette and was nominated for the 1967 Hugo Award for Best Novelette.
