= The Best Science Fiction of the Year 3 =

1974 anthology edited by Terry Carr

The Best Science Fiction of the Year #3
- Cover of first edition, 1974
- Editor: Terry Carr
- Cover artist: Larry Sutton
- Language: English
- Series: The Best Science Fiction of the Year
- Genre: Science fiction
- Publisher: Ballantine Books
- Publication date: 1974
- Publication place: United States
- Media type: Print (paperback)
- Pages: 368
- ISBN: 0-345-24063-4
- Preceded by: The Best Science Fiction of the Year 2
- Followed by: The Best Science Fiction of the Year 4

The Best Science Fiction of the Year #3 is an anthology of science fiction short stories edited by Terry Carr, the third volume in a series of sixteen. It was first published in paperback by Ballantine Books in July 1974, and reissued in July 1976.

The book collects eleven novellas, novelettes and short stories by various science fiction authors, with an introduction, notes and concluding essay by Carr. The stories were previously published in 1973 in the magazines The Magazine of Fantasy & Science Fiction and Analog Science Fiction/Science Fact, and the anthologies Astounding: John W. Campbell Memorial Anthology, Future City, Showcase, Three Trips in Time and Space, New Dimensions 3, Universe 3, and Nova 3.

== Contents ==
- "Introduction" (Terry Carr)
- "Something Up There Likes Me" (Alfred Bester)
- "The World as Will and Wallpaper" (R. A. Lafferty)
- "Breckenridge and the Continuum" (Robert Silverberg)
- "Rumfuddle" (Jack Vance)
- "Tell Me All About Yourself" (F. M. Busby)
- "The Deathbird" (Harlan Ellison)
- "Of Mist, and Grass, and Sand" (Vonda N. McIntyre)
- "The Death of Dr. Island" (Gene Wolfe)
- "The Ones Who Walk Away from Omelas" (Ursula K. Le Guin)
- "Sketches Among the Ruins of My Mind" (Philip José Farmer)
- "The Women Men Don't See" (James Tiptree, Jr.)
- "Honorable Mentions - 1973" (Terry Carr)

== Awards ==
The anthology placed second in the 1975 Locus Poll Award for Best Reprint Anthology/Collection.

"Rumfuddle" placed eighth in the 1974 Locus Poll Award for Best Novella.

"The Deathbird" was nominated for the 1973 Nebula Award for Best Novelette, won the 1974 Hugo Award for Best Novelette, and placed first in the 1974 Locus Poll Award for Best Short Fiction.

"Of Mist, and Grass, and Sand" won the 1973 Nebula Award for Best Novelette, was nominated for the 1974 Hugo Award for Best Novelette, and placed second in the 1974 Locus Poll Award for Best Short Fiction.

"The Death of Doctor Island" won the 1973 Nebula Award for Best Novella, was nominated for the 1974 Hugo Award for Best Novella, and placed first in the 1974 Locus Poll Award for Best Novella.

"The Ones Who Walk Away from Omelas" won the 1974 Hugo Award for Best Short Story and placed sixth in the 1974 Locus Poll Award for Best Short Fiction.

"Sketches Among the Ruins of My Mind" placed fourth in the 1974 Locus Poll Award for Best Novella.

"The Women Men Don't See" placed eighteenth in the 1974 Locus Poll Award for Best Short Fiction.
