= Great Sky River (novel) =

1987 novel by Gregory Benford

- First edition
- Author: Gregory Benford
- Cover artist: Roger Bergendorf
- Language: English
- Series: Galactic Center Saga
- Genre: Speculative Fiction
- Published: Dec 1987 (Bantam Spectra)
- Publication place: US
- Media type: Print (Hardcover, Paperback)
- Pages: 326
- Awards: Nebula Award (nom)
- ISBN: 0-553-05238-1
- Dewey Decimal: 813'.54
- LC Class: PS3552E542G7
- Preceded by: Across the Sea of Suns
- Followed by: Tides of Light

Great Sky River is a 1987 novel written by author Gregory Benford as a part of his Galactic Center Saga series of books.

== Synopsis ==
After the events of Across the Sea of Suns (1984), small groups of humans have settled on other star systems. However, there is a constant threat from the Mechs, a civilization of machines left over from other civilizations and evolved to see all biological civilization as unstable and dangerous.

Great Sky River tells the story of the Bishop family, who fight for their very existence on the planet Snowglade, which has been taken over by the Mechs. The Bishops are one of a number of families on Snowglade, all named for chess pieces. These "families" are more like clans or tribes. All use cybernetic implants and mechanical aids to enhance their perceptions and physical abilities. Personalities of dead members of the Family can be stored in memory tabs and accessed by plugging them into ports implanted in the neck. Bodily functions, such as the sexual drive, can be turned off to remove distractions. The Families seem to be equipped for long conflicts and periods of privation, continually migrating to avoid the Mechs.

The novel takes place during a period when the Mechs have invaded Snowglade and are slowly altering its climate to suit themselves; drying it out to protect their steel bodies from rust. This adversely affects the humans, who otherwise seem to exist in a wary truce with the Mechs. Then, the Mechs begin destroying human settlements. For some reason, they are interested in Killeen Bishop, leader of the Bishop Family.

As the series progresses, it is revealed that the Bishops and related colonists are post-humans, or as the text describes them, a "fourth species of chimpanzee". The adults are actually 3 meters in height and have a stronger, more limber skeletal structure than humans. They are the survivors of thousands of years of conflict with the Mechs on Earth, the beginnings of which were described in the previous novels. Having defeated the Mechs in the Solar System, they have traveled to near the galactic center using slower-than-light space vessels, meaning that the setting is tens of thousands of years in the future. The remainder of the series describes the Bishops' progress to the center of Mech power, and the great secret they carry, which the Mechs fear.

== Galactic Center Saga series ==
- In the Ocean of Night (Galactic Center, #1) — published 1977
- Across the Sea of Suns (Galactic Center, #2) — published 1984
- Great Sky River (Galactic Center, #3) — published 1987
- Tides of Light (Galactic Center, #4) — published 1989
- Furious Gulf (Galactic Center, #5) — published 1994
- Sailing Bright Eternity (Galactic Center, #6) — published 1995
