= World's Best Science Fiction: 1966 =

1966 anthology edited by Donald A. Wollheim and Terry Carr

- Cover of first edition, 1966
- Author: edited by Donald A. Wollheim and Terry Carr
- Cover artist: Jack Gaughan
- Language: English
- Series: World's Best Science Fiction
- Genre: Science fiction
- Publisher: Ace Books
- Publication date: 1966
- Publication place: United States
- Media type: Print (paperback)
- Pages: 287 pp.
- Preceded by: World's Best Science Fiction: 1965
- Followed by: World's Best Science Fiction: 1967

World's Best Science Fiction: 1966 is an anthology of science fiction short stories edited by Donald A. Wollheim and Terry Carr, the second volume in a series of seven. It was first published in paperback by Ace Books in 1966. It was reprinted by the same publisher in 1970 under the alternate title World's Best Science Fiction: Second Series. An Italian edition appeared in December 1966 under the title Il vento del sole.

The book collects fifteen novelettes and short stories by various science fiction authors, with an introduction by the editors. Most of the stories were previously published in 1964 and 1965 in the magazines New Worlds SF, Amazing Stories, The Magazine of Fantasy & Science Fiction, Galaxy Magazine, If, and Analog Science Fact -> Science Fiction; another was published for the first time in the collection.

== Contents ==
- "Introduction" (Donald A. Wollheim and Terry Carr)
- "Sunjammer" (Arthur C. Clarke)
- "Calling Dr. Clockwork" (Ron Goulart)
- "Becalmed in Hell" (Larry Niven)
- "Apartness" (Vernor Vinge)
- "Over the River and Through the Woods" (Clifford D. Simak)
- "Planet of Forgetting" (James H. Schmitz)
- "'Repent, Harlequin!' Said the Ticktockman" (Harlan Ellison)
- "The Decision Makers" (Joseph L. Green)
- "Traveler's Rest" (David I. Masson)
- "Uncollected Works" (Lin Carter)
- "Vanishing Point" (Jonathan Brand)
- "In Our Block" (R. A. Lafferty)
- "Masque of the Red Shift" (Fred Saberhagen)
- "The Captive Djinn" (Christopher Anvil)
- "The Good New Days" (Fritz Leiber)

== Awards ==
"Becalmed in Hell" was nominated for the 1965 Nebula Award for Best Short Story.

"Over the River and Through the Woods" was nominated for the 1965 Nebula Award for Best Short Story.

"Planet of Forgetting" was nominated for the 1965 Nebula Award for Best Novelette

"'Repent, Harlequin!' Said the Ticktockman" won the 1965 Nebula Award for Best Short Story and the 1966 Hugo Award for Best Short Fiction.

"The Decision Makers" was nominated for the 1965 Nebula Award for Best Novelette.

"Uncollected Works" was nominated for the 1965 Nebula Award for Best Short Story.

"Vanishing Point" was nominated for the 1965 Nebula Award for Best Novelette.

"In Our Block" was nominated for the 1965 Nebula Award for Best Short Story.

"Masque of the Red Shift" was nominated for the 1965 Nebula Award for Best Novelette.

"The Good New Days" was nominated for the 1965 Nebula Award for Best Short Story.

== Reception ==
Algis Budrys found the anthology unimpressive, saying that one-third of the stories "will not on inspection seem to be outstanding". He concluded that WBSF66 was "not a bad anthology" and"contains some rewarding moments." but that it reflects "what its editors think science fiction ought to be, or worse, it can be the false face they think will most ingratiate the field with strangers".
