= Galactic Center Saga =

Novel series by Gregory Benford

The Galactic Center Saga is a series of books by author Gregory Benford detailing a galactic war between mechanical and biological life.

- In the Ocean of Night (1977) — 1977 Nebula Award nominee, 1978 Locus Award nominee
- Across the Sea of Suns (1984)
- Great Sky River (1987) — 1988 Nebula Nominee
- Tides of Light (1989) — 1990 Locus Award nominee
- Furious Gulf (1994)
- Sailing Bright Eternity (1996)
- "A Hunger for the Infinite" a novella published in the anthology Far Horizons

== Reception ==
Paul Witcover in Sci Fi Weekly wrote that the series is "one of the most ambitious and enthralling sagas in all of science fiction: The epic tale of a star-spanning civilization of intelligent machines methodically working to exterminate a species of pestiferous vermin that calls itself humanity."

== Adaptation ==
In 2001, film director Jan De Bont announced that a television series based on the six-book saga was "in the works" at Viacom Productions. As of May 2022, however, no such series has been produced.

== See also ==
- Galactic Center
