= The Best Science Fiction of the Year 2 =

1973 anthology edited by American writer Terry Carr

The Best Science Fiction of the Year #2
- Cover of first edition, 1973
- Editor: Terry Carr
- Cover artist: Chris Foss
- Language: English
- Series: The Best Science Fiction of the Year
- Genre: Science fiction
- Publisher: Ballantine Books
- Publication date: 1973
- Publication place: United States
- Media type: Print (paperback)
- Pages: 370
- ISBN: 0-345-03312-4
- Preceded by: The Best Science Fiction of the Year
- Followed by: The Best Science Fiction of the Year 3

The Best Science Fiction of the Year #2 is an anthology of science fiction short stories edited by American writer Terry Carr, the second volume in a series of sixteen. It was first published in paperback by Ballantine Books in July 1973, and reissued in May 1976.

The book collects sixteen novellas, novelettes and short stories by various science fiction authors, with an introduction, notes and concluding essay by Carr. The stories were previously published in 1972 in the magazines The Magazine of Fantasy & Science Fiction, Amazing Science Fiction, and Analog Science Fiction/Science Fact, and the anthologies New Dimensions II, Infinity Four, Orbit 10, Infinity Three, New Writings in SF 20, Clarion II, Again, Dangerous Visions, Nova 2, and Universe 2.

== Contents ==
- "Introduction" (Terry Carr)
- "The Meeting" (Frederik Pohl) and (C. M. Kornbluth)
- "Nobody's Home" (Joanna Russ)
- "Fortune Hunter" (Poul Anderson)
- "The Fifth Head of Cerberus" (Gene Wolfe)
- "Caliban" (Robert Silverberg)
- "Conversational Mode" (Grahame Leman)
- "Their Thousandth Season" (Edward Bryant)
- "Eurema's Dam" (R. A. Lafferty)
- "Zero Gee" (Ben Bova)
- "Sky Blue" (Alexei Panshin) and (Cory Panshin)
- "Miss Omega Raven" (Naomi Mitchison)
- "Patron of the Arts" (William Rotsler)
- "Grasshopper Time" (Gordon Eklund)
- "Hero" (Joe Haldeman)
- "When We Went to See the End of the World" (Robert Silverberg)
- "Painwise" (James Tiptree, Jr.)
- "Honorable Mentions - 1972" (Terry Carr)

== Awards ==
The anthology placed first in the 1974 Locus Poll Award for Best Reprint Anthology/Collection.

"The Meeting" won the 1973 Hugo Award for Best Short Story and placed ninth in the 1973 Locus Poll Award for Best Short Fiction.

"The Fifth Head of Cerberus" was nominated for the 1972 Nebula Award for Best Novella and the 1973 Hugo Award for Best Novella, placed third in the 1973 Locus Poll Award for Best Novella, and placed eleventh in the 1973 Locus Poll Award for Best SF Novel.

"Caliban" placed twelfth in the 1973 Locus Poll Award for Best Short Fiction.

"Eurema's Dam" won the 1973 Hugo Award for Best Short Story and placed 16th in the 1973 Locus Poll Award for Best Short Fiction.

"Patron of the Arts" was nominated for the 1972 Nebula Award for Best Novelette and the 1973 Hugo Award for Best Novelette, and placed second in the 1973 Locus Poll Award for Best Short Fiction.

"Hero" was nominated for the 1973 Hugo Award for Best Novella and placed fourth in the 1973 Locus Poll Award for Best Novella.

"When We Went to See the End of the World " was nominated for the 1972 Nebula Award for Best Short Story and the 1973 Hugo Award for Best Short Story, and placed 14th in the 1973 Locus Poll Award for Best Short Fiction.

"Painwise" was nominated for the 1973 Hugo Award for Best Novelette and placed eighth in the 1973 Locus Poll Award for Best Short Fiction.
