= The Best Science Fiction of the Year =

The Best Science Fiction of the Year edited by Terry Carr, Ballantine Books, 1972, cover art by Chris Foss.

The Best Science Fiction of the Year was a series of annual paperback anthologies edited by Terry Carr. It was published by Ballantine Books from 1972 to 1980, Pocket Books from 1981 to 1983, Baen Books in 1984, and Tor Books from 1985 to 1987. The Tor Books volumes bore the title Terry Carr's Best Science Fiction of the Year from 1985 to 1986, and Terry Carr's Best Science Fiction and Fantasy of the Year in 1987. Most volumes were also issued in hardcover in the United Kingdom by Gollancz, the last three under the variant title Best SF of the Year. The series was a continuation of the earlier anthology series World's Best Science Fiction, edited by Carr with Donald A. Wollheim, published from 1965 to 1971 by Ace Books. (Wollheim, with co-editor Arthur W. Saha, also issued his own separate continuation, The Annual World’s Best SF, from 1972 to 1990.)

Each annual volume reprinted what in the opinion of the editor were the best science fiction short stories appearing in the previous year. The series also aimed to discover and nurture new talent. It featured both occasionally recurring authors, and writers new to the science fiction genre.

== The series ==
1. The Best Science Fiction of the Year (1972)
2. The Best Science Fiction of the Year #2 (1973)
3. The Best Science Fiction of the Year #3 (1974)
4. The Best Science Fiction of the Year #4 (1975)
5. The Best Science Fiction of the Year #5 (1976)
6. The Best Science Fiction of the Year #6 (1977)
7. The Best Science Fiction of the Year #7 (1978)
8. The Best Science Fiction of the Year #8 (1979)
9. The Best Science Fiction of the Year #9 (1980)
10. The Best Science Fiction of the Year #10 (1981)
11. The Best Science Fiction of the Year #11 (1982)
12. The Best Science Fiction of the Year #12 (1983)
13. The Best Science Fiction of the Year #13 (1984)
14. Terry Carr's Best Science Fiction of the Year (1985) = Best SF of the Year #14 (1985)
15. Terry Carr's Best Science Fiction of the Year #15 (1986) = Best SF of the Year #15 (1986)
16. Terry Carr's Best Science Fiction and Fantasy of the Year #16 (1987) = Best SF of the Year 16 (1987)

== See also ==
- The Year's Best Science Fiction
- Year's Best SF
