= Across the Sea of Suns =

1984 novel by Gregory Benford

- Cover of first edition (hardcover)
- Author: Gregory Benford
- Cover artist: Original uncredited; John Dismukes (1994 reprint)
- Language: English
- Series: Galactic Center Saga
- Genre: Hard science fiction
- Published: 1984 (Timescape Books/Simon & Schuster)
- Publication place: United States
- Media type: Print (hardback & paperback)
- Pages: 399
- ISBN: 0-671-44668-1
- OCLC: 9852812
- Dewey Decimal: 813/.54 19
- LC Class: PS3552.E542 A65 1984
- Preceded by: In the Ocean of Night
- Followed by: Great Sky River

Across the Sea of Suns is a 1984 hard science fiction novel by American writer Gregory Benford. It is the second novel in his Galactic Center Saga, and continues to follow the scientist Nigel Walmsley, who encountered an extraterrestrial machine in the previous book, In the Ocean of Night, aboard an expeditionary spacecraft, searching for life. Eventually Nigel discovers evidence of the major conflict in the galaxy.

== Plot summary ==
In 2021, radio astronomy on the Moon reveals the presence of life by a nearby red dwarf, on a tide-locked planet. (Note: The star is apparently Lalande 21185, also known as BD +36 2147. Warner 2004 mass-market paperback ed., p. 15.) To investigate, Earth's governments convert a space colony into Lancer, a Bussard ramjet-powered interstellar ship based on the design of a crashed alien ship discovered in the Mare Marginis.

In 2061, the Lancer arrives and discovers a primitive race of nomads, broadcasting using organs adapted to emit and receive electromagnetic radiation (hence "EM"s). A curious satellite is discovered in orbit, at least a million years old, roughly when a meteor shower destroyed the EMs' civilization.

On Earth, international commerce is brought to a standstill when mysterious spaceships drop sea creatures dubbed Swarmers and Skimmers (for their behaviour: Swarmers swarm ships and head-butt them until they sink, and Skimmers simply jump and skim around like dolphins). They begin multiplying and the Swarmers begin attacking humans and all their works on the seas.

The expedition's first contacts go poorly: The attempt to enter one of the two satellites prompts a massive retaliation that kills most of the crew. Meanwhile, their attempt to contact the EMs in person confuses them; the aliens had expected a reply directly from Earth. The EMs' attempt to communicate with the messenger via radar accidentally cooks him alive. The standby team misinterprets the accident as a deliberate attack and massacres the EMs.

Nigel works with mathematicians and other experts to interpret the EMs' transmission. His analysis reveals that their technologically advanced civilization had attracted the attention of machines, who attacked with orbital bombardments that levelled the EMs' cities and cracked open the crust of the planet, permanently altering the ecosphere. The EMs used genetic engineering to adapt their bodies to use silicon and transistors for a nervous system. As the satellite is programmed to react only to high technology, not inbuilt features of organisms, the EMs are able to broadcast their message to other biological races unmolested.

No sooner has two-way communication been established than new orders come from Earth to move on to Ross 128, where they think the Skimmers and Swarmers may have originated. En route, the crew analyze reports from space probes. Walmsley hypothesizes that a machine-based race is systematically destroying or guarding planets supporting organic life, and is responsible for the anomalies; the Swarmers represent a first strike at Earth, which had eluded the machines' attempts to kill it, since the assigned Watcher (as Nigel calls the satellites) was destroyed by the Mare Marginis wreck. His ideas are regarded as being too speculative; the consensus is that Watchers are simply a form of weaponry left over from the suicide of biological races, and the Swarmer invasion is a grab for a new world.

At Ross 128, a Ganymede-like moon is found with a Watcher in orbit. Initially it is taken as a disproof of Walmsley's idea that Watchers will appear around any depopulated world that had once harboured technologically advanced biological life. The de facto leader Ted, who has always disliked Walmsley, attempts to covertly force Walmsley into hibernation until they return to Earth. Walmsley breaks out part-way through the medical preparations and escapes to the moon. There he discovers a much-reduced sapient civilization that had links to the EMs before the Watcher came. The Watcher prevented the moon's inhabitants from reaching the surface and developing technology, but cannot destroy the civilization as it is protected by ten kilometres of ice.

News comes from Earth (delayed nine years by the speed of light) that the Swarmers have begun land invasions; the tense superpowers each suspect the other, and escalate into a full-scale nuclear war. The machines, who had attempted to engineer just such a conflict, send their flotilla against the weakened Earth. The grim news galvanizes the crew to reactivate the fusion drive and turn the plume on the Watcher. This tactic cripples the Watcher, but its retaliation damages the Lancer’s drive system.

=== New ending ===
At some point after the publication of one or more sequels (beginning with Great Sky River, for the American paperback edition), Benford appended a new ending onto the original ending of the novel. The following section is from the second edition of the book to bridge over to the continuance of the Galactic Core Saga:

The Watcher is eventually blinded by being coated with a life-form native to the moon, which eats metals and other such materials, thus allowing the humans to board the ship. The boarding party discovers a map of the galaxy marked with places significant to the machines, and a fast vessel to take them to those places. Now the leader, Nigel vetoes suggestions that they return to Earth and quoting Adventures of Huckleberry Finn ("Le's all slide out of here one of these nights and go for howling adventures amongst the Injuns over in the territory; and I says all right, that suits me.") energizes everyone for a voyage to the Galactic Center, the most important place of all for the machines. Earth's ocean-borne myriads, now partnered with the Skimmers against the Swarmers, will just have to fend for themselves.

== Reception ==
Dave Langford reviewed Across the Sea of Suns for White Dwarf #58, and stated that "a fat, impressive demonstration that one can do ultra-'hard' SF with every rivet placed just so, and still write well. It helps if like Benford you're a professor of physics..."

== Reviews ==
- Review by Dan Chow (1983) in Locus, #275 December 1983
- Review by Jerry L. Parsons (1984) in SF & Fantasy Review, March 1984
- Review by Frank Catalano (1984) in Amazing Stories, July 1984
- Review by Chris Henderson (1984) in Dragon Magazine, August 1984
- Review by Tom Easton (1984) in Analog Science Fiction/Science Fact, September 1984
- Review by Richard E. Geis (1985) in Far Frontiers
- Review [French] by Pascal J. Thomas (1985) in Fiction, #369
- Review by David Pringle (1985) in Interzone, #13 Autumn 1985
- Review by L. J. Hurst (1986) in Paperback Inferno, #58
