= The Geometry of Narrative =

"The Geometry of Narrative" is a 1983 science fiction short story by American writer Hilbert Schenck. It was first published in Analog Science Fiction.

== Plot summary ==
A literature student proposes a new way to apply geometrical concepts to the analysis of narrative, with unexpected results.

== Reception ==
"The Geometry of Narrative" was shortlisted for the 1983 Nebula Award for Best Short Story and the 1984 Hugo Award for Best Short Story.

Brian Stableford described it as "a modernised Platonic dialogue".
