= Minority Report (2002 collection) =

2002 collection of science fiction stories by Philip K. Dick

- Dust-jacket from the first edition
- Author: Philip K. Dick
- Language: English
- Genre: Science fiction
- Publisher: Gollancz
- Publication date: 2002
- Publication place: United Kingdom
- Media type: Print (paperback)
- Pages: xi, 290
- ISBN: 1-85798-738-1
- OCLC: 52055601

Minority Report is a collection of science fiction stories by American writer Philip K. Dick. It was first published by Gollancz in 2002. Most of the stories had originally appeared in the magazines Fantastic Universe, Astounding, Space Science Fiction, Galaxy Science Fiction, Worlds of Tomorrow, and Fantasy and Science Fiction.

== Contents ==
- untitled interview
- Introduction, by Malcolm Edwards
- "The Minority Report"
- "Imposter"
- "Second Variety"
- "War Game"
- "What the Dead Men Say"
- "Oh, to Be a Blobel!"
- "The Electric Ant"
- "Faith of Our Fathers"
- "We Can Remember It for You Wholesale"
