= A Rose for Armageddon =

Novel by Hilbert Schenck

- Author: Hilbert Schenck
- Language: English
- Publisher: Timescape Books
- Publication date: 1 October 1982
- ISBN: 978-0671443115

A Rose for Armageddon is a science fiction novel by American writer Hilbert Schenck, published in 1982.

== Plot summary ==
It is the story of elderly scientists Elsa Adams and Jake Stinson, who study the history of a small island in New England.

== Reception ==
Greg Costikyan reviewed A Rose for Armageddon in Ares Magazine #14 and commented that "Few writers [...] have the wit or the breadth of imagination to play with ideas on as grandiose a scale as Schenck. Despite his rationality – or, as I think he would maintain, because of it – Schenck remains a romantic."

Dave Langford reviewed the novel for White Dwarf #57, and stated that "the mystical turn of the final 24 pages is a surprise and delight after Schenck's underplayed but escalating evocations of doom. I don't believe a word of it after p 166, but recommend it just the same."

Colin Greenland reviewed A Rose for Armageddon for Imagine magazine, and stated that "The solution of the mystery twists all of space and time into a new and startling pattern."

== Reviews ==
- Review by Faren Miller (1982) in Locus, #260 September 1982
- Review by Tom Easton (1983) in Analog Science Fiction/Science Fact, February 1983
- Review by Brian Stableford (1983) in Foundation, #28 July 1983
- Review by Mary Gentle (1984) in Interzone, #9 Autumn 1984, (1984)
