= Eater (novel) =

2000 novel by Gregory Benford

- Author: Gregory Benford
- Language: English
- Genre: Hard science fiction
- Published: 2000
- Publication place: United States

Eater is a hard science fiction novel by American writer Gregory Benford. It was published in May 2000 by Eos. Heavy on the physics information, Eater describes humankind's encounter with a cosmic intelligence that comes in the form of a small black hole.

== Plot summary ==
In the early 21st century, astronomers detect what appears to be a distant gamma-ray burster, a black hole engulfing another star many light years away. The data are bizarre and troubling, because only 13 hours later, a second burster appears, which, given the great distance between stars, would be impossible. Eventually, the astronomers realize that the black hole, rather than being incredibly far from us, is actually heading towards the Solar System, and moving our way at considerable speed. Stranger still, it seems to be moving under its own will; it is an intelligent being itself. This age-old cosmic being reveals that it had been born seven billion years ago and had become a wandering entity, feeding on asteroids, planets and various space debris, projecting itself forward in space through the process.

Through the billions of years of its existence across the expanse of time and space, this intelligent entity has learned of many ancient civilizations in the universe. The black hole eventually sends a message to the people of Earth: "I desire converse," an apparent desire to communicate with human beings. The black hole is willing to share the knowledge it had gained throughout the ages in return for the chance to "chat" with the humans. But eventually, something about the nature of the life-form is revealed. It prefers to learn about people by having their minds uploaded to it and demands that the best and brightest of Earth be sent to it in this way.

The three astronomer protagonists: Benjamin Knowlton; his cancer-stricken wife, Channing; and the British Astronomer Royal, Kingsley Dart, must save the Earth and all of humanity from annihilation at the hands of this entity that they dub the Eater.
