= The Eye of the Sibyl =

Short story by Philip K. Dick

"The Eye of the Sibyl" is a science fiction short story by American writer Philip K. Dick. It was written sometime around 1975, but not published until 1987 when it was included in volume 5 (subtitled "The Little Black Box") of The Collected Stories of Philip K. Dick, and has been reprinted since in other editions of this book such as the U.S. edition The Eye of the Sibyl and Other Stories .

This is said to have been Dick's first piece of fiction for publication after his "2-3-74" experience that was the basis for his Exegesis, and later the novels VALIS, the posthumously published precursor to VALIS, Radio Free Albemuth, and The Divine Invasion. Eventually rejected by the venue for which it was written, the major points of Dick's 1975 worldview are set forth, in a style reminiscent of his earlier work, and very similar to his treatment of this material in his later books.
