= We Can Remember It for You Wholesale =

1966 short story by Philip K. Dick

- Short story by Philip K. Dick
- Language: English
- Genre: Science fiction

Publication
- Published in: The Magazine of Fantasy & Science Fiction
- Publication type: Magazine
- Publisher: Mystery House
- Publication date: April 1966
- Publication place: United States

"We Can Remember It for You Wholesale" is a science fiction novelette by American writer Philip K. Dick, first published in The Magazine of Fantasy & Science Fiction in April 1966. It features a melding of reality, false memory, and real memory. The story was adapted into the 1990 film Total Recall with Arnold Schwarzenegger as the story's protagonist; that film was remade in 2012 with Colin Farrell as the protagonist.

== Synopsis ==
Douglas Quail works a menial office job in the "not too distant future." His biggest dream has always been to visit Mars but he is constantly dissuaded by his wife. Quail eventually discovers Rekal Incorporated, where he goes to receive memory implants of having traveled to Mars. To the shock of the Rekal technicians, under sedation, Quail somehow regains erased memories of who he really is. Quail's memories reveal that he really is a secret agent who has been to Mars.

The Rekal representative, McClane, refunds half of Quail's money and sends him home. Quail thinks that the operation was a failure because his memories are blurry, and he remembers his trip to the office to get the procedure done. He returns home still believing the memories are fake but discovers a box of fauna smuggled from Mars in his desk. He confronts his wife about whether or not he has actually been to Mars, and she angrily leaves him. Two armed men suddenly enter and reveal that Quail has a telepathic transmitter in his head that allows them to read his thoughts. Through this interaction, Quail suddenly remembers why he had his memories erased: Quail wasn't just a secret agent, he was an assassin who killed a political opponent for Earth's government.

With his memories returned, the armed men try to kill Quail, but Quail, with his abilities awakened as well, fights them off and escapes. Wondering what to do, Quail contacts his former commanders through the telepathic transmitter. Quail suggests going through another mind-wipe, but this time replacing his current awareness of being an assassin with the pleasant memory of an exciting life. His commanders agree, feeling that it is their obligation to help their former agent.

Quail turns himself in and is placed with a psychiatrist to figure out what his own personal desires are. When he was young, Quail used to fantasize that as a child he came across minuscule rodent-like aliens that were going to launch a full invasion of Earth with their superior technology. However, young Quail was so kind to and accepting of the aliens that they decided to hold off on their invasion as long as he was alive. While finding the fantasy narcissistic, his commanders agree to plant the memories at Rekal. To everyone's shock, those memories turn out to be real as well.

== Characters and organizations ==
Douglas Quail
menial worker whose strong desire to visit Mars was brought about by a suppressed memory of having been there
Kirsten Quail
Quail's wife. She is annoyed by Douglas's constant bantering about wanting to go to Mars.
Mr. McClane
a senior doctor at Rekal Incorporated.
Shirley
a receptionist working for Rekal Incorporated.
Rekal Incorporated
company that deals in false memory implantation.
Interplan
secretive government agency responsible for erasing Quail's original memories of Mars.

== Publication history ==
"We Can Remember It for You Wholesale" was first published in the April 1966 issue of The Magazine of Fantasy & Science Fiction. It has been republished in the following collections:

- Nebula Award Stories Number Two (1967)
- World's Best Science Fiction: 1967 (1967)
- The Preserving Machine (1969)
- Alpha 5 (1974)
- The Collected Stories of Philip K. Dick: Volume V (1987)
- The Little Black Box (1990)
- We Can Remember It for You Wholesale (1990)
- The Philip K. Dick Reader (1997)
- Minority Report (2002)
- Selected Stories of Philip K. Dick (2002)
- The Wesleyan Anthology of Science Fiction (2010)

== Film adaptations ==
The plot was loosely adapted into the 1990 film Total Recall, directed by Paul Verhoeven and starring Arnold Schwarzenegger. A remake was directed by Len Wiseman and released on August 3, 2012. While the owners of Carolco had licensed the story from Dick for the 1990 version, the 2012 film was largely based on the original and does not credit Dick as a writer. Both films include the main concepts of Dick's story but contain many alterations.
