= Rautavaara's Case =

1980 short story by Philip K. Dick

"Rautavaara's Case" is a science fiction short story by American writer Philip K. Dick. It was first published in 1980 in Omni magazine and subsequently in the 1985 short story collection I Hope I Shall Arrive Soon. The story was also included on We Can Remember It For You Wholesale, volume five of the Collected Short Stories of Philip K. Dick in 2003.

The story is about Agneta Rautavaara, a young Finnish technician, who dies in an accident while working on a space vessel with two other technicians. However, a rescue team from Proxima Centauri gets there in time to save Rautavaara's brain and impose artificial life support on it. In her damaged brain, Rautavaara goes through a series of experiences that draw on the conceptions of afterlife held by herself on the one hand and the Proxima Centauri natives on the other.

A theme of the story is whether it is ethically right to keep a human on life-support if they exist only as a mind, with their body paralyzed or otherwise destroyed.
