= Darkchild (novel) =

Novel by Sydney J. Van Scyoc

Darkchild is a science fiction novel by American writer Sydney J. Van Scyoc, published in 1982.

== Plot summary ==
It is the story of a clone named Darkchild, programmed to use his potent psionic powers to observe other people.

== Reception ==
Colin Greenland reviewed the novel for Imagine magazine, and stated that "It's a grim and tearful story, and for all its imaginative conviction I found it hard going, Van Sycoc is rather too lavish with her characters' misery."

Dave Langford reviewed Darkchild for White Dwarf #56, and stated that "Darkchild succeeds through evocative writing and 'information feed', that unobstructive trickle of data which [...] keeps satisfying your curiosity and at the same time stimulating it with fresh questions concerning the way things are."

== Reviews ==
- Review by Faren Miller (1982) in Locus, #259 August 1982
- Review by Debbie Notkin (1983) in Rigel Science Fiction, #7 Spring 1983
- Review by Tom Easton (1983) in Analog Science Fiction/Science Fact, June 1983
- Review by Ellen Kushner (1983) in Heavy Metal, July 1983
- Review by Alan Fraser (1984) in Paperback Inferno, #49
