= Hilbert Schenck =

American novelist (1926–2013)

Hilbert van Nydeck Schenck Jr. (February 12, 1926 – December 2, 2013) was an American science fiction writer and engineer. He taught at the University of Rhode Island.

Several of his short fiction works were nominated for Hugos and Nebulas. He also wrote several textbooks on engineering.

== Award nominations ==
=== Hugo Awards ===
- 1980, Best Novella: "The Battle of the Abaco Reefs"
- 1984, Best Novella: "Hurricane Claude"
- 1984, Best Short Story: "The Geometry of Narrative"
- 1985, Best Novelette: "Silicon Muse"

=== Nebula Awards ===
- 1980, Best Novella: "The Battle of the Abaco Reefs"
- 1984, Best Short story: "The Geometry of Narrative"

== Bibliography ==
=== Novels ===
- At the Eye of the Ocean (1981)
- A Rose for Armageddon (1982)
- Chronosequence (1988)

=== Short story collections ===
- Wave Rider (1980)
  - "The Morphology of the Kirkham Wreck" (1978)
  - "Three Days at the End of the World" (1977)
  - "Buoyant Ascent" (1980)
  - "Wave Rider" (1979)
  - "The Battle of the Abaco Reefs" (1979)
- Steam Bird (1988)
  - "Hurricane Claude" (1983)
  - "Steam Bird" (1984)

=== Short stories ===
- "Tomorrow's Weather" (1953)
- "The Theology of Water" (1982)
- "The Geometry of Narrative" (1953)
- "Silicon Muse" (1984)
- "Send Me a Kiss by Wire" (1985)
- "Ring Shot" (1986)
- "A Down East Storm" (1990)
- "A Present for Santa" (1993)
