= Born with the Dead =

Novella by Robert Silverberg

"Born with the Dead" is a science fiction novella by Robert Silverberg. It describes a near-future world in which the recently dead can be "rekindled" to a new life, but one in which their personalities and attitudes are radically changed; although they possess their memories from their previous lives, their former concerns no longer appear important to them. The story parallels that of Eurydice and Orpheus in the underworld.

Originally published in 1974 in The Magazine of Fantasy & Science Fiction, "Born with the Dead" won both the 1975 Nebula Award for Best Novella and the 1975 Locus Award for Best Novella. The story has subsequently been republished many times in collections.

Silverberg described writing it as one of his most difficult challenges.

With Silverberg's permission, Damien Broderick wrote a 30,000 word sequel, "Quicken," which was published with the original as a composite novel, Beyond the Doors of Death and included by editor Gardner Dozois in his The Year's Best Science Fiction: Thirty-First Annual Collection, 2014.
