= Void (fanzine) =

Void was a major science fiction fanzine. It was started in

1955 by Gregory Benford and his identical twin brother James (Jim) Benford, when they were living in Germany;[1] then later co-edited by Gregory Benford, Ted White, Terry Carr, and Peter Graham.[2][3] It is described in one reference work thus: "Void was the fanzine with many heads. Its many editors covered all aspects of fanac — criticism, humor, history and commentary."[4] The Benford brothers edited Void  until 1958,[5] when Jim retired and Ted White became co-editor. Pete Graham and Terry Carr later joined the editorial team. The fanzine was published regularly until 1962, with a final issue appearing in 1969.[6]
