= Sydney J. Van Scyoc =

American science fiction writer (1939–2023)

Sydney J. Van Scyoc (July 27, 1939 – June 17, 2023) was an American science fiction writer. Her first published story was "Shatter the Wall" in Galaxy in 1962. She continued to write short stories throughout the 1960s and in 1971, published her first novel, Saltflower. Other novels followed until 1992, when she abandoned writing to make and sell jewelry. Gordon Van Gelder, editor of The Magazine of Fantasy and Science Fiction published her first story in more than 20 years in the December 2004 issue. He stated in an introduction to the story that: "in June 1992, after years of writing fiction, she became obsessed with jewelry making and spent a decade selling earrings and bracelets in the San Francisco Bay area. Last year she retired from that trade and now spends most of her time gardening and conferring with her cats...and, yes, writing again." Van Gelder would publish one more story in the December 2005 issue of his magazine and at that time stated in the introduction: "Joyce Van Scyoc lives in the San Francisco Bay Area and spends all summer gardening until the October rains drive her inside."

According to book reviewer Dani Zweig, coming of age and human evolution are common themes in Van Scyoc's books. In the novel Assignment Nor'Dyren, the two main characters are young humans off on an adventure visiting an alien world. Tollan Bailey has not been able to fit into the post-industrial work force of Earth, but the world Nor'Dyren provides an environment well suited to his interests. Laarica Johns is the other main human character, struggling to develop a career and escape from her over-protective parents. The theme of evolution is also present in Assignment Nor'Dyren, with questions raised about how human-like species must adapt to an environment that includes advanced technologies such as space travel.

== Books ==
- Saltflower (1971) Avon Books
- Assignment Nor'Dyren (1973) Avon Books; ISBN 0-380-17160-0.
- Starmother (1976) Berkley; ISBN 0-399-11674-5
- Cloudcry (1977) Berkley; ISBN 0-425-03651-0.
- Sunwaifs (1981) Berkley; ISBN 0-425-04645-1.
- Darkchild (1982) Berkley; ISBN 0-425-05644-9
- Bluesong (1983) Berkley; ISBN 0-425-07130-8
- Starsilk (1984) Berkley; ISBN 0-425-07207-X
- Daughters of the Sunstone (Darkchild, Bluesong and Starsilk) (1984) Nelson Doubleday, Inc.; ISBN 0-425-06157-4
- Drowntide (1987) Berkley; ISBN 0-425-09775-7.
- Feather Stroke (1989) Avon Books; ISBN 0-380-75438-X.
- Deepwater Dreams (1991) Avon Books; ISBN 0-380-76003-7.
