= Terry Carr =

American writer and editor (1937–1987)

- Terry Carr c.1972
- Born: Terry Gene Carr; February 19, 1937; Grants Pass, Oregon, U.S.
- Died: April 7, 1987 (aged 50)
- Education: City College of San Francisco; University of California, Berkeley
- Spouses: Miriam Dyches (m. 1959; div. 1961) Carol Stuart (m. 1961–1987)

Terry Gene Carr (February 19, 1937 – April 7, 1987) was an American science fiction fan, author, editor, and writing instructor.

== Background and discovery of fandom ==
Carr was born in Grants Pass, Oregon. He attended the City College of San Francisco and the University of California, Berkeley from 1954 to 1959.

Carr discovered science fiction fandom in 1949, where he became an enthusiastic publisher of fanzines, which later helped open his way into the commercial publishing world. (He was one of the two fans responsible for the hoax fan 'Carl Brandon' after whom the Carl Brandon Society takes its name.) Despite a long career as a science fiction professional, he continued to participate as a fan until his death. He was nominated five times for Hugos for Best Fanzine (1959–1961, 1967–1968), winning in 1959, was nominated three times for Best Fan Writer (1971–1973), winning in 1973, and was Fan Guest of Honor at ConFederation in 1986.

== Professional work ==
Though he published some fiction in the early 1960s, Carr concentrated on editing. He first worked at Ace Books, establishing the Ace Science Fiction Specials series which published, among other novels, Behold the Man and The Warlord of the Air by Michael Moorcock, The Left Hand of Darkness by Ursula K. Le Guin and Rite of Passage by Alexei Panshin.

After conflicts with Ace head Donald A. Wollheim, he worked as a freelancer. He edited an original story anthology series called Universe, and a series of The Best Science Fiction of the Year anthologies that ran from 1972 until his death in 1987. He also edited numerous one-off anthologies over the same time span. He was nominated for the Hugo for Best Editor thirteen times (1973–1975, 1977–1979, 1981–1987), winning twice (1985 and 1987). His win in 1985 was the first time a freelance editor had won.

Terry Carr commissioned a first novel from William Gibson for the second series of Ace Science Fiction Specials, shortly after the Denver WorldCon, 1981. The purpose of the series was to give attention to first-time novelists. Gibson's fellow Ace Specials first-timers were Kim Stanley Robinson, Michael Swanwick, Lucius Shepard, Carter Scholz, and Howard Waldrop. William Gibson mentions Carr in the introduction to the 20th Anniversary Edition of the book: "Having been talked into signing a contract (by the late Terry Carr, without whom there would certainly be no Neuromancer) . . ."

Carr taught at the Clarion Workshop at Michigan State University in 1978, where his students included Richard Kadrey and Pat Murphy.

== Personal life ==
Carr married a fellow science fiction fan, Miriam Dyches, in 1959. They were divorced in 1961. Later that year, Carr married Carol Newmark. He remained married to her until his death. Under her married name of Carol Carr, his widow has also sold science fiction: "You Think You've Got Troubles" (1969), "Inside" (1970), "Some Are Born Cats" (1973, with Terry Carr), "Wally a Deux" (1973), and "Tooth Fairy" (1984).

== Death ==
On April 7, 1987, Carr died of congestive heart failure. A memorial gathering of the science fiction community was held in Tilden Park in Berkeley, California, on May 30. An original anthology of science fiction, Terry's Universe, was published the following year; all proceeds went to his widow. His papers and his large collection of fanzines (71 linear feet and almost 2000 titles) have become part of the Eaton collection of Science Fiction at the University of California, Riverside.

== Published works ==
=== Novels ===
- Warlord of Kor (1963)
- Invasion From 2500 (1964, with Ted White using the joint pseudonym Norman Edwards)
- Cirque (1977)

=== Collections ===
- The Incompleat Terry Carr (1972, 1988)
- The Light at the End of the Universe (1976)
- Fandom Harvest (1986)

=== Anthologies ===
==== World's Best Science Fiction ====
- World's Best Science Fiction: 1965 (1965 with Donald A. Wollheim)
- World's Best Science Fiction: 1966 (1966 with Donald A. Wollheim)
- World's Best Science Fiction: 1967 (1967 with Donald A. Wollheim)
- World's Best Science Fiction: 1968 (1968 with Donald A. Wollheim)
- World's Best Science Fiction: 1969 (1969 with Donald A. Wollheim)
- World's Best Science Fiction: 1970 (1970 with Donald A. Wollheim)
- World's Best Science Fiction: 1971 (1971 with Donald A. Wollheim)

==== The Best Science Fiction of the Year ====
- The Best Science Fiction of the Year (1972)
- The Best Science Fiction of the Year #2 (1973)
- The Best Science Fiction of the Year #3 (1974)
- The Best Science Fiction of the Year #4 (1975)
- The Best Science Fiction of the Year #5 (1976)
- The Best Science Fiction of the Year #6 (1977)
- The Best Science Fiction of the Year #7 (1978)
- The Best Science Fiction of the Year #8 (1979)
- The Best Science Fiction of the Year #9 (1980)
- The Best Science Fiction of the Year #10 (1981)
- The Best Science Fiction of the Year #11 (1982)
- The Best Science Fiction of the Year #12 (1983)
- The Best Science Fiction of the Year #13 (1984)
- Terry Carr's Best Science Fiction of the Year (1985)
- Terry Carr's Best Science Fiction of the Year #15 (1986)
- Terry Carr's Best Science Fiction and Fantasy of the Year #16 (1987)

==== Universe ====
- Universe 1 (1971)
- Universe 2 (1972)
- Universe 3 (1973)
- Universe 4 (1974)
- Universe 5 (1975)
- Universe 6 (1976)
- Universe 7 (1977)
- Universe 8 (1978)
- Universe 9 (1979)
- Universe 10 (1980)
- Universe 11 (1981)
- Universe 12 (1982)
- Universe 13 (1983)
- Universe 14 (1984)
- Universe 15 (1985)
- Universe 16 (1986)
- Universe 17 (1987)

==== Other anthologies ====
- New Worlds of Fantasy (1967)
- New Worlds of Fantasy #2 (1970)
- New Worlds of Fantasy #3 (1971)
- Year's Finest Fantasy (1978)
- Year's Finest Fantasy 2 (July 1979)
- Fantasy Annual III (May 1981)
- Fantasy Annual IV (November 1981)
- Fantasy Annual V (November 1982)
- Science Fiction for People Who Hate Science Fiction (1966)
- The Others (1969)
- On Our Way to the Future (1970)
- This Side of Infinity (1972)
- Into the Unknown (1973)
- An Exaltation of Stars (1973)
- Fellowship of the Stars (1974)
- Worlds Near and Far (1974)
- Creatures from Beyond (1975)
- Planets of Wonder (1976)
- The Ides of Tomorrow (1976)
- The Infinite Arena (1977)
- To Follow a Star: Nine Science Fiction Stories About Christmas (1977)
- Classic Science Fiction: The First Golden Age (1978)
- Beyond Reality (1979)
- Dream's Edge (1980)
- A Treasury of Modern Fantasy (1981) with Martin H. Greenberg
- 100 Great Fantasy Short Short Stories (1984) with Isaac Asimov and Martin H. Greenberg

== Sources ==
- Tuck, Donald H. (1974). The Encyclopedia of Science Fiction and Fantasy. Chicago: Advent. p. 93. ISBN 0-911682-20-1.
- Tuck, Donald H. (1978). The Encyclopedia of Science Fiction and Fantasy. Chicago: Advent. p. 467. ISBN 0-911682-22-8.
- Plaid Works: Electronic OtherRealms #16
