= Gregory Benford =

American science fiction author and astrophysicist (born 1941)

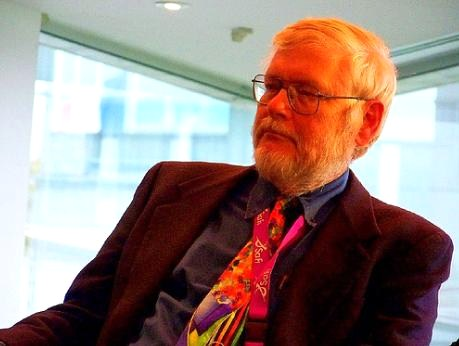
- Born: January 30, 1941 (age 85); Mobile, Alabama, U.S.
- Education: University of Oklahoma (BS); University of California, San Diego (MS), (PhD)
- Occupations: Physicist, writer
- Spouse: Joan Abbe (died 2002) Elisabeth Brown (m. 2006)
- Children: 2
- Writing career
- Genres: Science fiction, hard science fiction
- Notable work: Galactic Center Saga novels

Gregory Benford (born January 30, 1941) is an American science fiction author and astrophysicist who is professor emeritus at the department of physics and astronomy at the University of California, Irvine. He is a contributing editor of Reason magazine.

Benford wrote the Galactic Center Saga science fiction novels, beginning with In the Ocean of Night (1977). The series postulates a galaxy in which sentient organic life is in constant warfare with sentient electromechanical life.

In 1969, he wrote "The Scarred Man", the first story about a computer virus (based on a real computer virus he had spread), published in 1970.

== Biography ==
Benford was born in Mobile, Alabama and grew up in Robertsdale and Fairhope. Graduating Phi Beta Kappa, he received a Bachelor of Science in physics in 1963 from the University of Oklahoma in Norman, Oklahoma, followed by a Master of Science from the University of California, San Diego in 1965, and a doctorate there in 1967. That same year he married Joan Abbe, with whom he had two children. Benford modeled characters in several of his novels after his wife, most prominently the heroine of Artifact. She died in 2002.

Benford has an identical twin brother, James (Jim) Benford, with whom he has collaborated on science fiction stories. Both got their start in science fiction fandom, with Gregory being a co-editor of the science fiction fanzine Void. At one point, Benford said he was an atheist because he could not reconcile the evil in the world with a benevolent God. However, he has returned to the Episcopal Church where he is a communicant at St. Mary's Episcopal Church in Laguna Beach. Benford is also the uncle of Dominic Benford, NASA's Chief Technologist for Astrophysics and Program Scientist for the Nancy Grace Roman Space Telescope.

He has been a long-time resident of Laguna Beach, California.

== Writing career ==
Gregory Benford's first professional sale was the story "Stand-In" in the Magazine of Fantasy and Science Fiction (June 1965), which won second prize in a short story contest based on a poem by Doris Pitkin Buck. In 1969, he began writing a science column for Amazing Stories.

Benford tends to write hard science fiction which incorporates the research he is doing as a practical scientist. He has worked on collaborations with authors William Rotsler, David Brin and Gordon Eklund. His time-travel novel Timescape (1980) won both the Nebula Award and the John W. Campbell Memorial Award and was co-authored with his sister-in-law, Hilary Foister Benford. This scientific procedural novel eventually lent its title to a line of science fiction published by Pocket Books. In the late 1990s, he wrote Foundation's Fear, one of an authorized sequel trilogy to Isaac Asimov's Foundation series. Other novels published in that period include several near-future science thrillers: Cosm (1998), The Martian Race (1999) and Eater (2000).

Benford has served as an editor of numerous alternate history anthologies, as well as collections of Hugo Award winners.

He has been nominated for four Hugo Awards (for two short stories and two novellas) and 13 Nebula Awards (in all categories). In addition to Timescape, he won the Nebula for the novelette "If the Stars Are Gods" (with Eklund).

Benford was a guest of honour at Aussiecon Three, the 1999 Worldcon. He remains a regular contributor to science fiction fanzines, for example Apparatchik (defunct as of 1997).

In 2016 Benford was the recipient of the Los Angeles Science Fantasy Society Forry Award Lifetime Achievement Award in the Field of Science Fiction.

== Contributions to science and speculative science ==
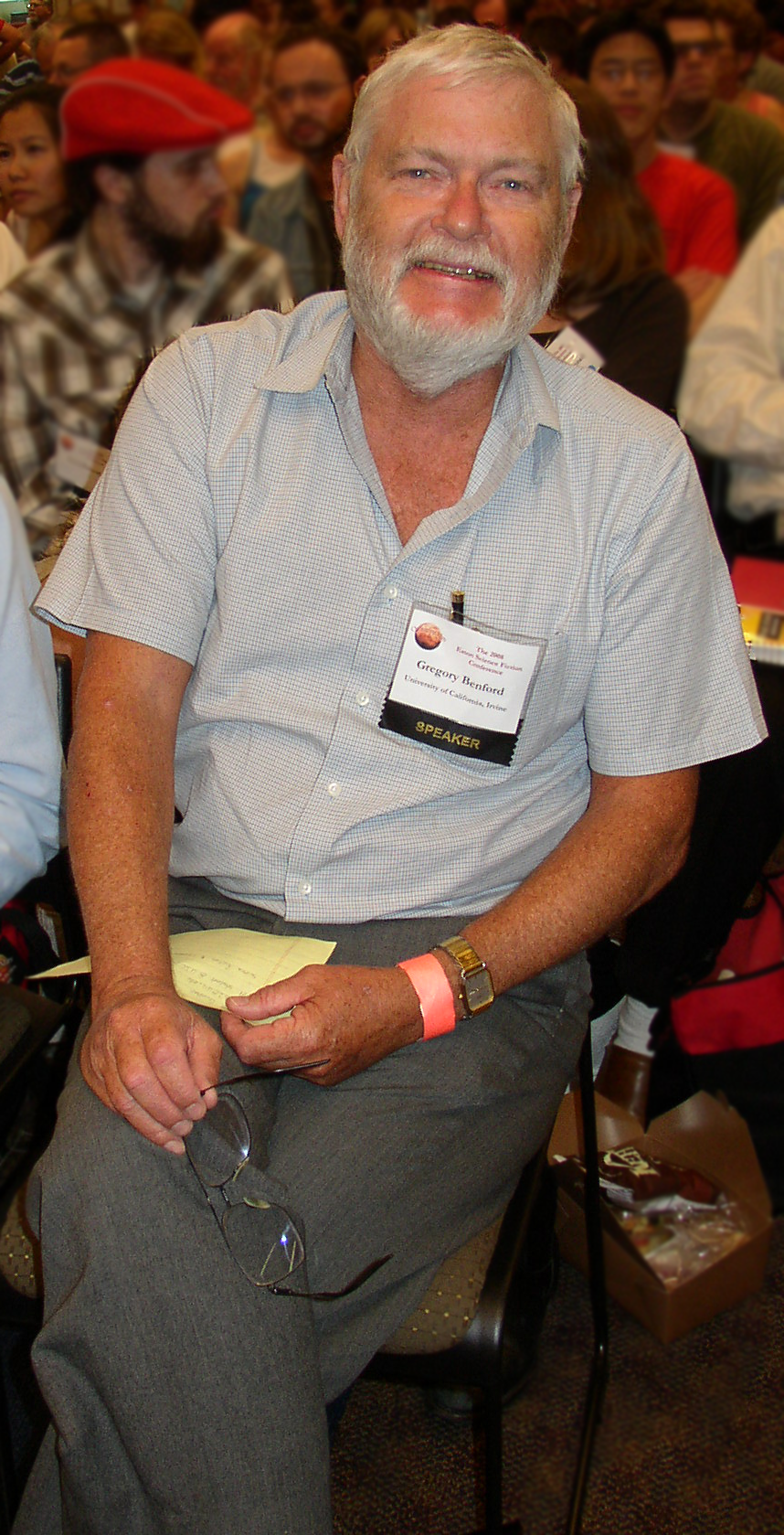
Benford in 2008

Gregory Benford is professor emeritus of physics at the University of California, Irvine. With more than 200 scientific publications, his research encompassed theory and experiments in the fields of astrophysics and plasma physics. His research has been supported by NSF, NASA, AFOSR, DOE and other agencies. He is an ongoing advisor to NASA, DARPA (Defense Advanced Research Projects Agency) and the CIA.

Benford's work in physics at the University of California focused on theoretical and experimental plasma physics, including studies of extremely strong turbulence, particularly in astrophysical contexts, and studies of magnetic structures from the Galactic Center to large-scale galactic jets. Working in collaboration with, among others, science fiction writers Cramer, Forward, and Landis, Benford worked on a theoretical study of the physics of wormholes, which pointed out that wormholes, if formed in the early universe, could still exist in the present day if they were wrapped in a negative-mass cosmic string. Such wormholes could potentially be detected by gravitational lensing.

In 2004, Benford proposed that the harmful effects of global warming could be reduced by the construction of a rotating Fresnel lens 1,000 kilometres across, floating in space at the Lagrangian point L1. According to Benford, this lens would diffuse the light from the Sun and reduce the solar energy reaching the Earth by approximately 0.5% to 1%. He estimated that this would cost around US$10 billion. His plan has been commented on in a variety of forums. A similar space sunshade was proposed in 1989 by J. T. Early, and again in 1997 by Edward Teller, Lowell Wood, and Roderick Hyde. In 2006, Benford pointed out one possible danger in this approach: if this lens were built and global warming were avoided, there would be less incentive to reduce greenhouse gases, and humans might continue to produce too much carbon dioxide until it caused some other environmental catastrophe, such as a chemical change in ocean water that could be disastrous to ocean life.

Benford serves on the board of directors and the steering committee of the Mars Society.

He has advocated human cryopreservation, for example by signing an open letter to support research into cryonics, being a member of Alcor, and by being an advisor to a UK cryonics and cryopreservation advocacy group.

Gregory Benford retired from the University of California in 2006 in order to found and develop Genescient Corporation. Genescient is a new generation biotechnology company that claims to combine evolutionary genomics with massive selective screening to analyze and exploit the genetics of model animal and human whole genomes.

== Scientific awards and recognition ==
- Phi Beta Kappa
- Woodrow Wilson Fellow
- Fellow of the American Physical Society
- Visiting Fellow
  - Cambridge University
  - University of Turin
  - University of Bologna.
- 1995 Lord Prize for contributions to science
- 2006 Professor Emeritus at the University of California, Irvine

== Benford's law of controversy ==
Benford's law of controversy is an adage from the 1980 novel Timescape:

Passion is inversely proportional to the amount of real information available.

The adage was quoted in an international drug policy article in a peer-reviewed social science journal.

== Selected bibliography ==
=== Galactic Center Saga ===
- In the Ocean of Night (1977)
- Across the Sea of Suns (1984)
- Great Sky River (1987)
- Tides of Light (1989)
- Furious Gulf (1994)
- Sailing Bright Eternity (1996)
- "A Hunger for the Infinite" a novella published in the 1999 anthology Far Horizons
