= Charles N. Brown =

American literary editor and publisher (1937–2009)

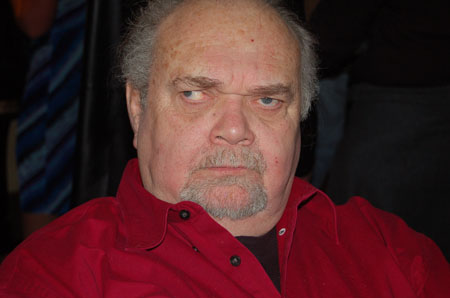
- Born: Charles Nikki Brown; June 24, 1937; Brooklyn, New York, U.S.
- Died: July 12, 2009 (aged 72); New York, U.S.
- Occupations: Editor, writer
- Writing career
- Period: c. 1968–2009
- Genres: Science fiction, fantasy
- Notable awards: Hugo Award

Charles Nikki Brown (June 24, 1937 – July 12, 2009) was an American publishing editor, the co-founder and editor of Locus, the long-running news and reviews magazine covering the genres of science fiction and fantasy literature. Brown was born on June 24, 1937, in Brooklyn, New York. He attended City College until 1956, when he joined the military at age 18; Brown served in the United States Navy for three years. Following his discharge from navy service, he went to work as a nuclear engineer but later on changed careers and entered the publishing field; Brown became a full-time science fiction editor with Locus in 1975.

== Career ==
Along with Ed Meskys and Dave Vanderwerf, Charles N. Brown founded Locus in 1968 as a news fanzine to promote a bid to host the 1971 World Science Fiction Convention in Boston. Originally intended to run only until the site-selection vote was taken at St. Louiscon, the 1969 Worldcon in St. Louis, Missouri, Brown decided to continue publishing Locus as a general science fiction and fantasy news fanzine. It quickly began to fill the void left when the decades-old news fanzine Science Fiction Times (formerly Fantasy Times, founded 1941) ceased publication in 1970 during the same time period. Locus gradually evolved into the field's professional trade journal and remains so today.

In 1970, it was first nominated in the category of Hugo Award for Best Fanzine. The following year at the 29th Worldcon, the first Noreascon that Locus was founded to promote and support, Brown's news fanzine won its first of a record 29 Hugo Awards (as of 2008).

== Death ==
Brown died peacefully in his sleep on his way home from Readercon at the age of 72. He previously had been announced as one of the guests of honor at Renovation, the 69th World Science Fiction Convention in Reno, Nevada. In accordance with established Worldcon tradition, he was retained as a guest of honor in memory of his longtime contributions to the science fiction field.
