= Pangborn =

Pangborn may refer to:

== People ==
- Clyde Pangborn (1895–1958), American aviator
- Dominic Pangborn (born 1952), Korean-American artist
- Edgar Pangborn (1909–1976), American author
- Franklin Pangborn (1889–1958), American character actor
- Georgia Wood Pangborn (1872–1955), American writer
- Mary C. Pangborn (1907–2003), American writer
- Rose Marie Pangborn (1932–1990), American scientist
- Tom Pangborn (1870–1926), English footballer

== Other uses ==
- Pangborn Hall (University of Notre Dame)
- Pangborn Memorial Airport, Douglas County, Washington, U.S.
- Alan Pangborn, in Stephen King's novel Needful Things and other works

== See also ==
- Pangborn-Herndon Memorial Site, East Wenatchee, Washington
- Pangbourne, Berkshire, England
- Pangburn, Arkansas, U.S.
