= Universe 10 =

1980 anthology of short stories edited by Terry Carr

- Cover of first edition
- Editor: Terry Carr
- Cover artist: Lawrence Ratzkin
- Language: English
- Series: Universe
- Genre: Science fiction
- Publisher: Doubleday
- Publication date: 1980
- Publication place: United States
- Media type: Print (hardcover)
- Pages: 182
- ISBN: 0-385-15477-1
- Preceded by: Universe 9
- Followed by: Universe 11

Universe 10 is an American anthology of original science fiction short stories edited by Terry Carr, the tenth volume in the seventeen-volume Universe anthology series. It was first published in hardcover by Doubleday in September 1980, with a Science Fiction Book Club edition following from the same publisher in October of the same year, and a paperback edition from Zebra Books in November 1982.

The book collects ten novellas, novelettes and short stories by various science fiction authors.

== Contents ==
- "Saving Face" (Michael Bishop)
- "A Source of Innocent Merriment" (James Tiptree, Jr.)
- "And All the Skies Are Full of Fish" (R. A. Lafferty)
- "Bête et Noir" (Lee Killough)
- "The Ugly Chickens" (Howard Waldrop)
- "SUPERL" (Charles E. Elliott)
- "Report of the Special Committee on the Quality of Life" (Eric G. Iverson)
- "The Confession of Hamo" (Mary C. Pangborn)
- "The Johann Sebastian Bach Memorial Barbecue and Nervous Breakdown" (Carter Scholz)
- "First Person Plural" (F. M. Busby)

== Awards ==
The anthology placed sixth in the 1981 Locus Poll Award for Best Anthology.

"Saving Face" placed eighth in the 1981 Locus Poll Award for Best Novelette.

"The Ugly Chickens" won the 1981 Nebula Award for Best Novelette and World Fantasy Award for Best Short Fiction, was nominated for the 1981 Hugo Award for Best Novelette and Balrog Award for Short Fiction, and placed fifth in the 1981 Locus Poll Award for Best Novelette.

"The Confession of Hamo" placed 19th in the 1981 Locus Poll Award for Best Short Story.
