= Universe 4 =

1974 anthology edited by Terry Carr

- Cover of first edition
- Editor: Terry Carr
- Cover artist: Bob Silverman
- Language: English
- Series: Universe
- Genre: Science fiction
- Publisher: Random House
- Publication date: 1974
- Publication place: United States
- Media type: Print (hardcover)
- Pages: 241
- ISBN: 0-394-48182-8
- Preceded by: Universe 3
- Followed by: Universe 5

Universe 4 is an anthology of original science fiction short stories edited by Terry Carr, the fourth volume in the seventeen-volume Universe anthology series. It was first published in hardcover by Random House in March 1974, with a Science Fiction Book Club edition following from the same publisher in July of the same year, a paperback edition from Popular Library in 1975, and a British hardcover edition from Dennis Dobson in 1977.

The book collects eight novelettes and short stories by various science fiction authors.

== Contents ==
- "Assault on a City" (Jack Vance)
- "A Sea of Faces (story)" (Robert Silverberg)
- "And Read the Flesh Between the Lines" (R. A. Lafferty)
- "My Sweet Lady Jo" (Howard Waldrop)
- "Stungun Slim" (Ron Goulart)
- "Desert Places" (Pamela Sargent)
- "If the Stars Are Gods" (Gordon Eklund and Gregory Benford)
- "When the Vertical World Becomes Horizontal" (Alexei Panshin)

== Awards ==
The anthology placed first in the 1975 Locus Poll Award for Best Original Anthology.

"Assault on a City" was a finalist for the 1975 Hugo Award for Best Novella and placed fourth in the 1975 Locus Poll Award for Best Novella.

"If the Stars Are Gods" won the 1975 Nebula Award for Best Novelette and placed eighth in the 1975 Locus Poll Award for Best Novelette.
