= Universe 3 (Silverberg anthology) =

1994 anthology edited by Robert Silverberg and Karen Haber

- Cover of first edition
- Editors: Robert Silverberg and Karen Haber
- Cover artist: Michael David Ward
- Language: English
- Series: Universe
- Genre: Science fiction
- Publisher: Bantam Books
- Publication date: 1994
- Publication place: United States
- Media type: Print (paperback)
- Pages: xii, 419
- ISBN: 0-553-56580-X
- Preceded by: Universe 2

Not to be confused with Universe 3 (Carr anthology).

Universe 3 is an anthology of original science fiction short stories edited by Robert Silverberg and Karen Haber, the third and last volume in a series of three, continuing an earlier series of the same name edited by Terry Carr. It was first published in paperback by Bantam Books in April 1994.

The book collects fifteen novellas, novelettes and short stories by various science fiction authors, together with an introduction by Silverberg.

== Contents ==
- "Introduction" (Robert Silverberg)
- "The Cure" (Joe Haldeman)
- "Composition with Barbarian and Animal" (Alex Jeffers)
- "Transcript of 'Yandal'" (Terry Boren)
- "Dirtyside Down" (Wil McCarthy)
- "Let Me Count the Ways" (Larry Tritten)
- "Moths to the Blue Flame" (E. Michael Blake)
- "Black Memes" (Jamil Nasir)
- "Neezies" (Mary A. Turzillo)
- "The Enemies of Nickel City" (Nicholas A. DiChario)
- "The Only Thing You Learn" (Barry N. Malzberg)
- "The Pigeonhole Principle" (David Ira Cleary)
- "Going West" (Phillip C. Jennings)
- "McGregor" (Paul Di Filippo)
- "The Apples of Venus" (Mark Rich)
- "The Madonna of Futurity" (Brian W. Aldiss)

== Awards ==
The anthology placed eighth in the 1995 Locus Poll Award for Best Anthology.

"The Madonna of Futurity" was nominated for the 1995 Hugo Award for Best Novella and placed sixteenth in the 1995 Locus Poll Award for Best Novella.
