= Universe 8 =

1978 anthology edited by Terry Carr

- Cover of first edition
- Editor: Terry Carr
- Cover artist: James Starrett
- Language: English
- Series: Universe
- Genre: Science fiction
- Publisher: Doubleday
- Publication date: 1978
- Publication place: United States
- Media type: Print (hardcover)
- Pages: 185
- ISBN: 0-385-12479-1
- Preceded by: Universe 7
- Followed by: Universe 9

Universe 8 is an anthology of original science fiction short stories edited by Terry Carr, the eighth volume in the seventeen-volume Universe anthology series. It was first published in hardcover by Doubleday in May 1978, with a paperback edition from Popular Library in July 1979, and a British hardcover edition from Dennis Dobson in July 1979.

The book collects eight novellas, novelettes and short stories by various science fiction authors.

== Contents ==
- "Old Folks at Home" (Michael Bishop)
- "David and Lindy" (Cynthia Felice)
- "Vermeer's Window" (Gordon Eklund)
- "Scattershot" (Greg Bear)
- "The Ecologically Correct House" (Charles Ott)
- "Hunting" (Michael Cassutt)
- "Nooncoming" (Gregory Benford)
- "Selenium Ghosts of the Eighteen Seventies" (R. A. Lafferty)

== Awards ==
The anthology placed third in the 1979 Locus Poll Award for Best Anthology.

"Old Folks at Home" placed fourth in the 1979 Locus Poll Award for Best Novella.

"Selenium Ghosts of the Eighteen Seventies" placed fifteenth in the 1979 Locus Poll Award for Best Novelette.
