= Universe 6 =

1976 anthology edited by Terry Carr

- Cover of first edition
- Editor: Terry Carr
- Cover artist: Richard Mantel
- Language: English
- Series: Universe
- Genre: Science fiction
- Publisher: Doubleday
- Publication date: 1976
- Publication place: United States
- Media type: Print (hardcover)
- Pages: 184
- ISBN: 0-385-11413-3
- Preceded by: Universe 5
- Followed by: Universe 7

Universe 6 is an anthology of original science fiction short stories edited by Terry Carr, the sixth volume in the seventeen-volume Universe anthology series. It was first published in hardcover by Doubleday in April 1976, with a paperback edition following from Popular Library in August 1977, and a British hardcover edition from Dennis Dobson in 1978.

The book collects seven novelettes and short stories by various science fiction authors.

== Contents ==
- "Journey to the Heartland" (Brian W. Aldiss)
- "What Did You Do Last Year?" (Gregory Benford and Gordon Eklund)
- "Custer's Last Jump" (Steven Utley and Howard Waldrop)
- "The Wine Has Been Left Open Too Long and the Memory Has Gone Flat" (Harlan Ellison)
- "Under the Generator" (John Shirley)
- "Stars and Darkness" (Glenn Chang)
- "Shifting Parameters in Disappearance and Memory" (Charlie Haas)

== Awards ==
The anthology placed fourth in the 1977 Locus Poll Award for Best Anthology.

"Custer's Last Jump" was nominated for the 1977 Nebula Award for Best Novelette, and placed seventh in the 1977 Locus Poll Award for Best Novelette.
