= Universe 11 =

1981 anthology of short stories edited by Terry Carr

- Cover of first edition
- Editor: Terry Carr
- Cover artist: Roger Zimmerman
- Language: English
- Series: Universe
- Genre: Science fiction
- Publisher: Doubleday
- Publication date: 1981
- Publication place: United States
- Media type: Print (hardcover)
- Pages: 192
- ISBN: 0-385-17226-5
- Preceded by: Universe 10
- Followed by: Universe 12

Universe 11 is an anthology of original science fiction short stories edited by Terry Carr, the eleventh volume in the seventeen-volume Universe anthology series. It was first published in hardcover by Doubleday in June 1981, with a paperback edition from Zebra Books in January 1983.

The book collects nine novelettes and short stories by various science fiction authors.

== Contents ==
- "The Quickening" (Michael Bishop)
- "The Snake Who Had Read Chomsky" (Josephine Saxton)
- "Shadows on the Cave Wall" (Nancy Kress)
- "The Gernsback Continuum" (William Gibson)
- "Venice Drowned" (Kim Stanley Robinson)
- "In Reticulum" (Carter Scholz)
- "Jean Sandwich, the Sponsor, and I" (Ian Watson)
- "The Start of the End of the World" (Carol Emshwiller)
- "Mummer Kiss" (Michael Swanwick)

== Awards ==
The anthology placed second in the 1982 Locus Award for Best Anthology.

"The Quickening" won the 1982 Nebula Award for Best Novelette, was nominated for the 1982 Hugo Award for Best Novelette, and placed tenth in the 1982 Locus Poll Award for Best Novelette.

"Shadows on the Cave Wall" placed twenty-fifth in the 1982 Locus Poll Award for Best Novelette.

"The Gernsback Continuum" placed twenty-fourth in the 1982 Locus Poll Award for Best Short Story.

"Venice Drowned" was nominated for the 1982 Nebula Award for Best Short Story and placed seventeenth in the 1982 Locus Poll Award for Best Short Story.

"Mummer Kiss" won the 1982 SF Chronicle Award for Best Novelette, was nominated for the 1982 Nebula Award for Best Novelette, and placed thirteenth in the 1982 Locus Poll Award for Best Novelette.
