= Universe 1 (Silverberg anthology) =

Science fiction shortcuts

- Cover of first edition
- Editors: Robert Silverberg and Karen Haber
- Cover artist: Richard Kriegler
- Language: English
- Series: Universe
- Genre: Science fiction
- Publisher: Doubleday Foundation
- Publication date: 1990
- Publication place: United States
- Media type: Print (hardcover)
- Pages: xiii, 449
- ISBN: 0-385-24812-1
- Preceded by: Universe 17
- Followed by: Universe 2

Universe 1 is an anthology of original science fiction short stories edited by American writers Robert Silverberg and Karen Haber, the first volume in a series of three, continuing an earlier series of the same name edited by Terry Carr. It was first published in hardcover and trade paperback by Doubleday Foundation in June 1990. A standard paperback edition was issued by Bantam Spectra in April 1991.

The book collects twenty novelettes and short stories by various science fiction authors, together with an introduction by Silverberg.

== Contents ==
- "Introduction" (Robert Silverberg)
- "The Translator" (Kim Stanley Robinson)
- "The City of Ultimate Freedom" (Geoffrey A. Landis)
- "The Shobies' Story" (Ursula K. Le Guin)
- "One Night in Television City" (Paul Di Filippo)
- "Playback" (Barry N. Malzberg)
- "Moon Blood" (M. J. Engh)
- "And of the Earth, a Womb" (John M. Landsberg)
- "Alimentary Tract" (Scott Baker)
- "The Songs the Anemone Sing" (Grania Davis)
- "Alien Used Cars" (Richard R. Smith)
- "O Time Your Pyramids" (Gregor Hartmann)
- "The Shores of Bohemia" (Bruce Sterling)
- "The Propagation of Light in a Vacuum" (James Patrick Kelly)
- "Whalesong" (Stoney Compton)
- "River of the Dying" (Augustine Funnell)
- "The Book of St. Farrin" (Jamil Nasir)
- "Bumpie (TM)" (Francis Valéry)
- "Love is a Drug" (Leah Alpert)
- "1099 A. G. F" (K. Hernandez-Brun)
- "Daniel's Labyrinth" (Damian Kilby)

== Awards ==
The anthology placed fourth in the 1991 Locus Poll Award for Best Anthology.

"The Shobies' Story" was nominated for the 1991 Nebula Award for Best Novelette and placed third in the 1991 Locus Poll Award for Best Novelette.

"The Shores of Bohemia" placed eleventh in the 1991 Locus Poll Award for Best Novelette.
