= Universe 12 =

1982 science fiction anthology

- Cover of first edition
- Editor: Terry Carr
- Cover artist: Roger Zimmerman
- Language: English
- Series: Universe
- Genre: Science fiction
- Publisher: Doubleday
- Publication date: 1982
- Publication place: United States
- Media type: Print (hardcover)
- Pages: 181
- ISBN: 0-385-17923-5
- Preceded by: Universe 11
- Followed by: Universe 13

Universe 12 is an anthology of original science fiction short stories edited by Terry Carr, the twelfth volume in the seventeen-volume Universe anthology series. It was first published in hardcover by Doubleday in June 1982, with a paperback edition from Zebra Books in December 1983. The first British edition was issued in hardcover by Robert Hale in 1983.

The book collects nine novelettes and short stories by various science fiction authors, together with an introduction by the editor.

== Contents ==
- "Introduction" (Terry Carr)
- "A Pursuit of Miracles" (George Turner)
- "Exploring Fossil Canyon" (Kim Stanley Robinson)
- "God's Hooks!" (Howard Waldrop)
- "Talp Hunt" (Nancy Kress)
- "When the Fathers Go" (Bruce McAllister)
- "Thieving Bear Planet" (R. A. Lafferty)
- "The Sorcerer's Apprentice" (Mary C. Pangborn)
- "In Memory of" (James Patrick Kelly)
- "Helen, Whose Face Launched Twenty-Eight Conestoga Hovercraft" (Leigh Kennedy)

== Awards ==
- The anthology placed fourth in the 1983 Locus Poll Award for Best Anthology.
- "A Pursuit of Miracles" was nominated for the 1991 Ditmar Award for Best Australian Long Fiction.
- "God's Hooks!" was nominated for the 1983 Nebula Award for Best Short Story and placed fourth in the 1983 Locus Poll Award for Best Short Story.
- "Helen, Whose Face Launched Twenty-Eight Conestoga Hovercraft" placed twenty-second in the 1983 Locus Poll Award for Best Novelette.
