= Universe 9 =

Science fiction anthology

- Cover of first edition
- Editor: Terry Carr
- Cover artist: Roger Zimmerman
- Language: English
- Series: Universe
- Genre: Science fiction
- Publisher: Doubleday
- Publication date: 1979
- Publication place: United States
- Media type: Print (hardcover)
- Pages: 182
- ISBN: 0-385-13649-8
- Preceded by: Universe 8
- Followed by: Universe 10

Universe 9 is an anthology of original science fiction short stories edited by Terry Carr, the ninth volume in the seventeen-volume Universe anthology series. It was first published in hardcover by Doubleday in May 1979, with a paperback edition from Fawcett Popular Library in April 1980, and a British hardcover edition from Dennis Dobson in May 1980.

The book collects nine novelettes and short stories by various science fiction authors. A brief introduction precedes each story.

== Contents ==
- "Frost Animals" (Bob Shaw)
- "Nuclear Fission" (Paul David Novitski)
- "Time Shards" (Gregory Benford)
- "The Captain and the Kid" (Marta Randall)
- "The Back Road" (Mary C. Pangborn)
- "Will the Chill" (John Shirley)
- "Chicken of the Tree" (Juleen Brantingham)
- "The White Horse Child" (Greg Bear)
- "Options" (John Varley)

== Awards ==
The anthology placed first in the 1980 Locus Award for Best Anthology.

"Options" was nominated for the 1980 Nebula and Hugo awards, and placed second in the 1980 Locus Poll Award, all for Best Novelette.
