= Universe 14 =

1984 anthology of short stories edited by Terry Carr

- Cover of first edition
- Editor: Terry Carr
- Cover artist: Peter R. Kruzan
- Language: English
- Series: Universe
- Genre: Science fiction
- Publisher: Doubleday
- Publication date: 1984
- Publication place: United States
- Media type: Print (hardcover)
- Pages: 182
- ISBN: 0-385-19134-0
- Preceded by: Universe 13
- Followed by: Universe 15

Universe 14 is an anthology of original science fiction short stories edited by Terry Carr, the fourteenth volume in the seventeen-volume Universe anthology series. It was first published in hardcover by Doubleday in June 1984, with a paperback edition from Tor Books in May 1986.

The book collects ten novelettes and short stories by various science fiction authors.

== Contents ==
- "The Lucky Strike" (Kim Stanley Robinson)
- "Gate of Horn, Gate of Ivory" (Robert Silverberg)
- "Passing as a Flower in the City of the Dead" (Sharon N. Farber)
- "O" (Damon Knight)
- "Art in the War Zone" (Pat Murphy)
- "Interlocking Pieces" (Molly Gloss)
- "The Menagerie of Babel" (Carter Scholz)
- "Deadtime" (Joel Richards)
- "Me/Days" (Gregory Benford)
- "Black Coral" (Lucius Shepard)

== Awards ==
The anthology placed second in the 1985 Locus Poll Award for Best Anthology.

"The Lucky Strike" was nominated for the 1985 SF Chronicle Award, Hugo Award, and Nebula Award, and placed fourth in the 1985 Locus Poll Award, in each instance for Best Novelette.

"Black Coral" placed tenth in the 1985 Locus Poll Award for Best Novelette.
