= Universe 2 (Silverberg anthology) =

1992 science fiction short story collection

- Cover of first edition
- Editors: Robert Silverberg and Karen Haber
- Cover artist: Jean-François Podevin
- Language: English
- Series: Universe
- Genre: Science fiction
- Publisher: Bantam Books
- Publication date: 1992
- Publication place: United States
- Media type: Print (hardcover)
- Pages: xv, 397
- ISBN: 0-553-08038-5
- Preceded by: Universe 1
- Followed by: Universe 3

Universe 2 is an anthology of original science fiction short stories edited by Robert Silverberg and Karen Haber, the second volume in a series of three, continuing an earlier series of the same name edited by Terry Carr. It was first published in hardcover Bantam Books and trade paperback by Bantam Spectra in March 1992.

The book collects twenty-two novelettes and short stories by various science fiction authors, together with an introduction by Silverberg.

== Contents ==
- "Introduction" (Robert Silverberg)
- "Life on the Artificial Heart" (Mark W. Tiedemann)
- "Automatic Death" (Cary James)
- "Waterworld, or All the Way Down" (John K. Gibbons)
- "Her Toes Were Beautiful on the Hilltops: Three Enigmas" (Brian W. Aldiss)
  - "Another Way Than Death"
  - "That Particular Green of Obsequies"
  - "The Ancestral Home of Thought"
- "The Cool Equations" (Deborah Wessell)
- "The Fire the Fire" (Alex Jeffers)
- "The Sum of All Potentials" (John M. Landsberg)
- "Most Politely, Most Politely" (Barry N. Malzberg)
- "Souls in the Great Machine" (Sean McMullen)
- "Lost in Transmission" (Tony Daniel)
- "Job Security" (Joe W. Haldeman)
- "The Passing of the Eclipse" (Donna Farley)
- "Forty at the Kiosk" (Nicholas A. DiChario)
- "By the Mirror of My Youth" (Kathe Koja)
- "Memories of Muriel" (Paula May)
- "Waiting for the Rain" (Dirk Strasser)
- "Program's Progress" (Jonathan Lethem)
- "The Shining Place" (Jamil Nasir)
- "Triad" (Lisa Mason)
- "(from) The Bridge" (Alex Jeffers)
- "Burning Bush" (Carolyn Gilman)
- "Metal Teeth" (Lou Fisher)

== Reception ==
Kirkus Reviews rates the anthology "[a]bout average overall, with new ideas few and far between and a stale writers'-workshop air hanging over much of the proceedings." Singled out as "[s]ome of the more intriguing entries" are "a murder mystery set aboard a Mars shuttle (Cary James); an alien contact/transcendence tale (Carolyn Gilman); absorbing xenology from Paula May; three more peculiar yet stimulating enigmas, courtesy of the redoubtable Brian W. Aldiss; and a witty parody of Tom Godwin's famous story, "The Cold Equations" (Deborah Wessel)."

== Awards ==
The anthology placed fourth in the 1993 Locus Poll Award for Best Anthology.
