= Universe 15 =

Anthology of science fiction short stories

- Cover of first edition
- Author: edited by Terry Carr
- Cover artist: Peter R. Kruzan
- Language: English
- Series: Universe
- Genre: Science fiction
- Publisher: Doubleday
- Publication date: 1985
- Publication place: United States
- Media type: Print (hardcover)
- Pages: 179 pp.
- ISBN: 0-385-19890-6
- Preceded by: Universe 14
- Followed by: Universe 16

Universe 15 is an anthology of original science fiction short stories edited by Terry Carr, the fifteenth volume in the seventeen-volume Universe anthology series. It was first published in hardcover by Doubleday in August 1985, with a paperback edition from Tor Books in December 1987.

The book collects ten novelettes and short stories by various science fiction authors.

== Contents ==
- "Mercurial" (Kim Stanley Robinson)
- "Paladin of the Lost Hour" (Harlan Ellison)
- "Giraffe Tuesday" (Juleen Brantingham)
- "Evergreen" (Arthur Jean Cox)
- "Mengele" (Lucius Shepard)
- "Originals" (Pamela Sargent)
- "Johann Sebastian Brahms" (Barry N. Malzberg)
- "Encounter on the Ladder" (Mona A. Clee)
- "Tidal Effects" (Jack McDevitt)
- "The Slovo Stove" (Avram Davidson)

== Awards ==
The anthology placed fifth in the 1986 Locus Poll Award for Best Anthology.

"Mercurial" placed thirteenth in the 1986 Locus Poll Award for Best Novelette.

"Paladin of the Lost Hour" won the 1986 Hugo Award, placed first in the Locus Poll Award, and was nominated for the SF Chronicle and Nebula Awards, in each instance for Best Novelette.

"Mengele" placed sixth in the 1986 Locus Poll Award for Best Short Story.

"The Slovo Stove" was nominated for the 1986 World Fantasy Award for Best Short Fiction and placed seventeenth in the 1986 Locus Poll Award for Best Novelette.
