= Universe 13 =

Anthology of science fiction short stories

- Cover of first edition
- Editor: Terry Carr
- Cover artist: Peter R. Kruzan
- Language: English
- Series: Universe
- Genre: Science fiction
- Publisher: Doubleday
- Publication date: 1983
- Publication place: United States
- Media type: Print (hardcover)
- Pages: 181
- ISBN: 0-385-18288-0
- Preceded by: Universe 12
- Followed by: Universe 14

Universe 13 is an anthology of original science fiction short stories edited by Terry Carr, the thirteenth volume in the seventeen-volume Universe anthology series. It was first published in hardcover by Doubleday in June 1983, with a paperback edition from Tor Books in March 1985. The first British edition was issued in hardcover by Robert Hale in March 1986.

The book collects seven novellas, novelettes and short stories by various science fiction authors.

== Contents ==
- "Her Habiline Husband" (Michael Bishop)
- "The Width of the World" (Ian Watson)
- "Stone Eggs" (Kim Stanley Robinson)
- "The Widow and the Body Sitter" (Bill Bickel)
- "The Taylorsville Reconstruction" (Lucius Shepard)
- "A Way Back" (Leanne Frahm)
- "Cicada Queen" (Bruce Sterling)

== Awards ==
The anthology placed third in the 1984 Locus Poll Award for Best Anthology.

"Her Habiline Husband" won the 1984 SF Chronicle Award for Best Novella placed first in the 1984 Locus Poll Award for Best Novella, and was nominated for the 1984 Nebula Award for Best Novella.

"Stone Eggs" placed fourteenth in the 1984 Locus Poll Award for Best Short Story.

"Cicada Queen" was nominated for the 1984 Nebula Award for Best Novelette and placed sixteenth in the 1984 Locus Poll Award for Best Novelette.
