= Universe 17 =

Anthology of original science fiction short stories

- Cover of first edition
- Editor: Terry Carr
- Cover artist: Peter R. Kruzan
- Language: English
- Series: Universe
- Genre: Science fiction
- Publisher: Doubleday
- Publication date: 1987
- Publication place: United States
- Media type: Print (hardcover)
- Pages: 180
- ISBN: 0-385-23853-3
- Preceded by: Universe 16
- Followed by: Universe 1

Universe 17 is an anthology of original science fiction short stories edited by Terry Carr, the last volume in the seventeen-volume Universe anthology series (though the series was rebooted a few years later). It was first published in hardcover by Doubleday in June 1987.

The book collects six novelettes and short stories by various science fiction authors.

== Contents ==
- "Second Going" (James Tiptree, Jr.)
- "Mencken Stuff" (Joel Richards)
- "Lapidary Nights" (Marta Randall)
- "The Man Who Watched the Glaciers Run" (Cherie Wilkerson)
- "Pliny's Commentaries" (Ned Huston)
- "In the Tower" (Jack McDevitt)

== Awards ==
The anthology placed fourth in the 1988 Locus Poll Award for Best Anthology.

"Second Going" placed twenty-third in the 1988 Locus Poll Award for Best Novelette.

"Lapidary Nights" placed twenty-fourth in the 1988 Locus Poll Award for Best Short Story.
