= Universe 5 =

1974 anthology edited by Terry Carr

- Cover of first edition
- Editor: Terry Carr
- Cover artist: Jon Lopez
- Language: English
- Series: Universe
- Genre: Science fiction
- Publisher: Random House
- Publication date: 1974
- Publication place: United States
- Media type: Print (hardcover)
- Pages: 209
- ISBN: 0-394-48562-9
- Preceded by: Universe 4
- Followed by: Universe 6

Universe 5 is an anthology of original science fiction short stories edited by Terry Carr, the fifth volume in the seventeen-volume Universe anthology series. It was first published in hardcover by Random House in November 1974, with a Science Fiction Book Club edition following from the same publisher in April 1975, a paperback edition from Popular Library in March 1976, and a British hardcover edition from Dennis Dobson in September 1978.

The book collects twelve novelettes and short stories by various science fiction authors.

== Contents ==
- "If This Is Winnetka, You Must Be Judy" (F. M. Busby)
- "Schrödinger's Cat" (Ursula K. Le Guin)
- "How It Felt" (Geo. Alec Effinger)
- "The Night Is Cold, the Stars Are Far Away" (Mildred Downey Broxon)
- "Mysterious Doings in the Metropolitan Museum" (Fritz Leiber)
- "M Is for the Many" (J. J. Russ)
- "The Night Wind" (Edgar Pangborn)
- "Survival Problems" (Kris Neville)
- "Passion Play" (J. Michael Reaves)
- "The Rubber Bend" (Gene Wolfe)
- "But As a Soldier, For His Country" (Stephen Goldin)
- "The Ramparts" (Hilary Bailey)

== Awards ==
The anthology placed seventh in the 1975 Locus Poll Award for Best Original Anthology.

"Mysterious Doings in the Metropolitan Museum" placed fourteenth in the 1975 Locus Poll Award for Best Short Story.
