= Isabel Leighton =

American writer and actress (1899–1995)

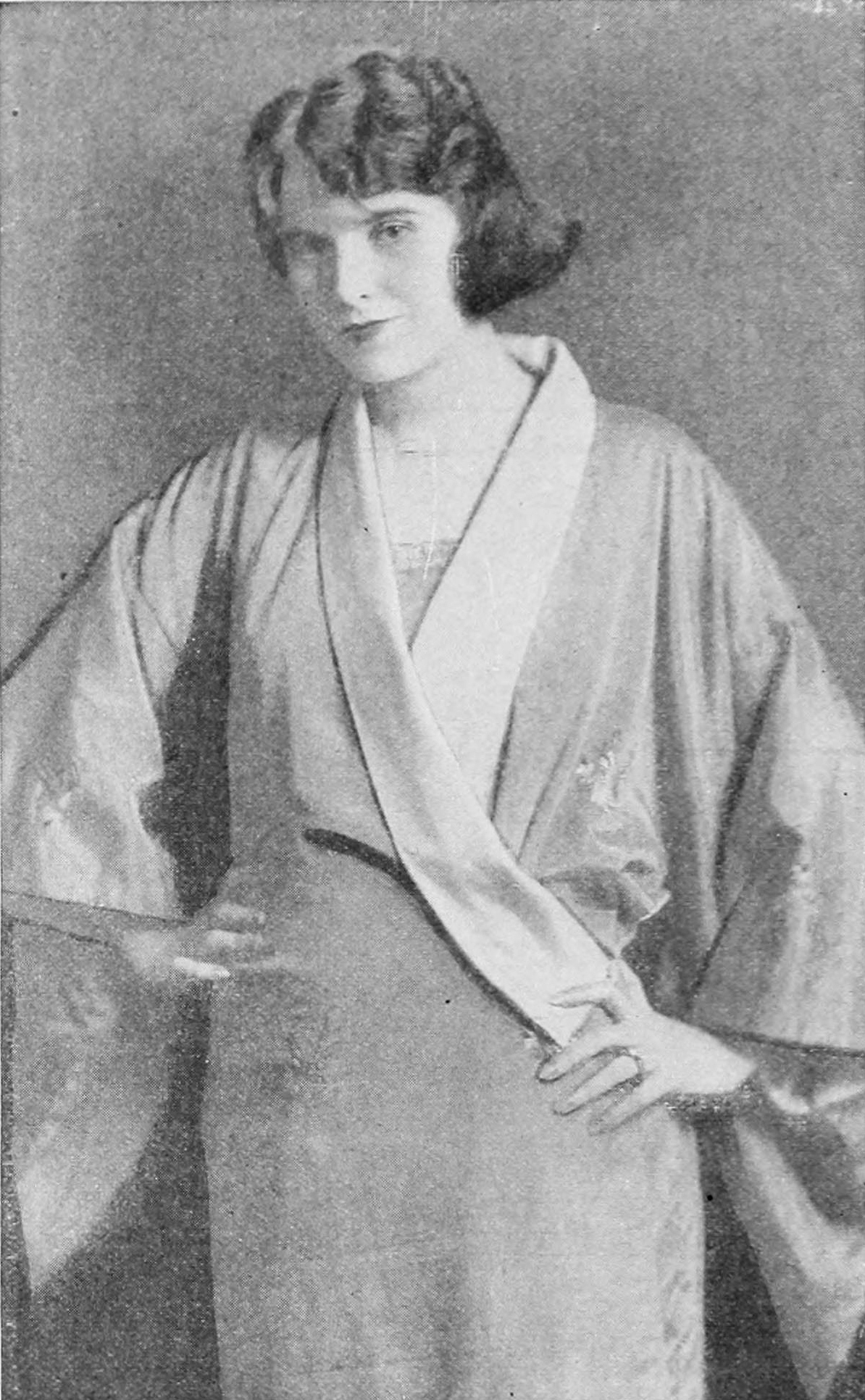
- Leighton in 1921
- Born: Isabella Kahn; July 17, 1899; New York City, U.S.
- Died: April 22, 1995 (aged 95); New York City, U.S.
- Occupations: Actress, writer
- Spouses: Herbert B. Lederer (died 1933) Frederic A. Willis (m. 1935, divorced) Arthur H. Bunker (died 1964)

Isabel Leighton Bunker (July 17, 1899 – April 22, 1995) was an American writer and actress. She was the writer of six Broadway plays, and had an extensive journalism career throughout the 1930s and 40s.

== Early life ==
Leighton was born as Isabella Kahn on July 17, 1899, in New York, New York, to Clara (née Rothschild) and David Kahn and was raised in high society. (Note: Some sources give her birth date as July 17, 1901, while her passport applications and birth record reflect that it was in 1899.) She graduated from Horace Mann School and then attended the Columbia School of Journalism, making her debut in 1917, before leaving school to marry.

== Career ==
=== As actress ===
Leighton's career began in the 1920s, when she appeared in several Broadway productions.

In 1920, she performed in Deburau. In 1922, she starred in Why Men Leave Home. In the next year, she starred in Anathema and What's Your Wife Doing?

In 1924, she starred in the John Henry Mears-produced play Sweet Seventeen at the Lyceum Theater. In the same year, she starred in The Haunted House. In 1925, she starred in The Dagger.

=== As scriptwriter ===
Leighton's first play was Mercenary Mary, which was written in 1925. It was an adaptation of the play What's Your Wife Doing?, which she had acted in two years earlier, and was performed in New York and Chicago. In the same year, she adapted The Sapphire Ring from Hungarian for the stage.

In 1927, she cowrote the operetta Katja with Frederick Lonsdale and Harry Graham. It was adapted from a German original and performed in Chicago's Garrick Theater. The next year, she adapted the play Polly With a Past into a musical comedy called Polly. It was performed on Broadway in 1929.

In 1939, Leighton wrote the story for the film Fight for Your Lady alongside Jean Negulesco. In 1941, she collaborated with Bertram Bloch to write the play Spring Again.

=== As journalist and author ===
During the 1930s and 40s, Leighton wrote for several magazines, including The Smart Set. She wrote for the North American Newspaper Alliance, for whom she interviewed Carol II of Romania in 1931.

In 1933, she published My Boy Franklin with Gabrielle Forbush, a collection of interviews with Sara Roosevelt about her son Franklin D. Roosevelt. Segments of the interviews were published in Good Housekeeping in February of that year. In the same year, she worked with Margaret Livingston Whiteman to write Whiteman's Burden, a look at her husband Paul Whiteman's difficulties with losing weight.

During the Second World War, she served as a naval correspondent. In 1944, she published Where Away: A Modern Odyssey with George Sessions Perry, which told the story of the USS Marblehead.

Leighton edited a collection of essays on life during the Interwar period titled The Aspirin Age: 1919-41. It featured essays from John Lardner and Howard Fast among others.

In 1945, she conducted an exclusive interview with Soong Mei-ling, the wife of Chiang Kai-shek.

=== Mental health activism ===
In the 1950s, Leighton served as moderator on the television show How Did They Get That Way?, which dealt with mental health issues.

She served on the boards of the World Federation for Mental Health, Menninger Foundation, and the National Committee for Mental Hygiene.

=== Political activism ===
In 1933, Leighton served as head of the women's committee of the National Recovery Administration campaign in New York City. She was appointed vice-chairman of the independent citizen's committee for Democratic New York mayoral candidate Joseph V. McKee, and vice-chairman for the women's division of his campaign.

== Personal life ==
Aged 17, Isabella married Herbert B. Lederer, a customer's man (registered representative) at Edward B. Smith & Co. brokerage firm. A dozen years into this marriage, she told an interviewer that American men seek out youth to their detriment, and that an older woman has more to offer, not least in constructive companionship. Herbert Lederer hanged himself in October 1933 at their 1045 Park Avenue apartment.

On February 15, 1935, at Norwalk, Connecticut, Leighton married Frederic A. Willis, assistant to William S. Paley, the president of Columbia Broadcasting System. Her second husband was a grandson of British Army officer Frederick Willis and a distant cousin of Winston Churchill through the Jerome family. His ex-wife, Helen Thornton Willis, committed suicide in her Park Avenue apartment in May 1938. Another ex-wife, Helen Hoadley Willis, married lawyer Lydig Hoyt (who had also married a 17 year old actress, Julia Hoyt)). Leighton and Willis were divorced by 1957.

Leighton was later married to Arthur H. Bunker, an American businessman and the brother of diplomat Ellsworth Bunker. His ex-wife, Frances Wilkinson, married Italian ambassador Augusto Rosso ("Mussolini's man") in January 1937. Bunker's daughter Daphne was found strangled on June 4, 1962, in her Topeka apartment. She had been a patient at the Menninger Clinic in the city and was briefly married to the writer Evan H. Rhodes. Bunker died of leukemia in 1964.

By 1964, she was living in the River House apartment building. In October 1964, she hosted a party for Rhodes and his co-author Merle Miller on the publication of their book Only You, Dick Daring (subtitled OR, HOW TO WRITE ONE TELEVISION SCRIPT AND MAKE $50,000,000, A TRUE-LIFE ADVENTURE). Guests included her brother-in-law Ellsworth Bunker, Joshua Logan and his wife Nedda Harrigan, and Hugh John Casey. In May 1968, she hosted a cocktail party for Gloria Vanderbilt on the opening of a new art exhibition.

Following a farewell dinner for Rudolf Bing at the Metropolitan Opera House on October 31, 1971, Leighton and two others were attacked by armed robbers outside River House, having thousands of dollars' worth of jewelry stolen.

Leighton died (aged 95) from a stroke at her Manhattan home on April 22, 1995.

== Legacy ==
Leighton's papers are kept within the Beinecke Rare Book & Manuscript Library at the Yale University Library and contain materials on her acting, writing, and mental health work. It includes scripts for The Sapphire Ring, Cadge, and Mercenary Mary, as well as correspondence from John Kenneth Galbraith, Henry Kissinger, and Archibald MacLeish.

=== Yale professorship ===
With Arthur Bunker having graduated from Yale University's Sheffield Scientific School in 1916, Leighton left a bequest following her death to create a new chair in hematology called the Arthur H. and Isabel Bunker Associate Professor in Medicine. Hematology covers the study of blood cancers such as the leukemia from which her husband died. The list of chairs and their appointed years is as follows:

- Nancy Berliner (1997)
- Madhav Dhodapkar (2008)
- Markus Müschen (2020)
- Stephanie Halene (2021)

== Filmography ==
Title	Year of production	Media	Notes
Deburau	1920	Stage work	
Why Men Leave Home	1922	Stage work	
Anathema	1923	Stage work	
What's Your Wife Doing?	1923	Stage work	
Sweet Seventeen	1924	Stage work	Performed at the Lyceum Theater.
The Haunted House	1924	Stage work	

== Publications ==
=== Books ===
Title	Year of first publication	First edition publisher	Notes
My Boy Franklin	1933	New York: Ray Long & Richard R. Smith	
Whiteman's Burden	1933	New York: Viking Press	Cowritten with Margaret Livingston Whiteman.
Where Away: A Modern Odyssey	1944		Cowritten with George Sessions Perry.
The Aspirin Age: 1919-41	1949	New York: Simon and Schuster	Editor.

=== Scripts ===
Title	Year of release	Media	Notes
The Sapphire Ring	1925	Stage work	
Mercenary Mary	1925	Stage work	
Katja	1927	Operetta	Cowritten with Frederick Lonsdale and Harry Graham.
Polly	1928	Stage work	
Fight for Your Lady	1937	Film	Story cowritten with Jean Negulesco.
Spring Again	1941	Stage work	Cowritten with Bertram Bloch.
