= Universe (anthology series) =

Series of science fiction anthologies

Universe 1 edited by Terry Carr, Ace Books, 1971...

Universe was a series of seventeen annual science fiction anthologies edited by Terry Carr, later revived as a series of three biennial anthologies edited by Robert Silverberg and Karen Haber. It was initially published in paperback by Ace Books (1971–1972), with subsequent volumes published in hardcover by Random House (1973–1975), Doubleday (1976–1987 and 1990), and Bantam Books (1992), and paperback by Popular Library, Zebra Books, Tor, and Bantam Spectra, successively. The last two volumes of the original series were issued in hardcover only, and the last volume of the revival in paperback only. British hardcover editions were published by Dennis Dobson (1971–1979) and Robert Hale (1982–1983).

The first two books are illustrated by Alicia Austin. Cover artists for the rest of the series include Davis Meltzer, Dean Ellis, Bob Silverman, Jon Lopez, Richard Mantel, Roger Zimmerman, James Starrett, Lawrence Ratzkin, Peter R. Kruzan, Richard Kriegler, Jean-François Podevin, and Michael David Ward.

Each annual volume consisted of original science fiction stories commissioned for the series, a number of which went on to win awards and become genre classics. During its period of publication it was an important venue for original short fiction in the field. Carr usually reprinted at least one selection from Universe in his Best Science Fiction of the Year anthology for the year following the one in which it had appeared in Universe.

== Books ==
- Universe 1 (1971)
- Universe 2 (1972)
- Universe 3 (1973)
- Universe 4 (1974)
- Universe 5 (1974)
- Universe 6 (1976)
- Universe 7 (1977)
- Universe 8 (1978)
- Universe 9 (1979)
- Universe 10 (1980)
- Universe 11 (1981)
- Universe 12 (1982)
- Universe 13 (1983)
- Universe 14 (1984)
- Universe 15 (1985)
- Universe 16 (1986)
- Universe 17 (1987)
- Universe 1 (1990)
- Universe 2 (1992)
- Universe 3 (1994)
