= Universe 2 =

Universe 2 may refer to:

- Universe 2 (Carr anthology), a 1972 anthology of science fiction short stories edited by Terry Carr
- Universe 2 (Silverberg anthology), a 1992 anthology of science fiction short stories edited by Robert Silverberg and Karen Haber
