= Universe 1 =

Universe 1 may refer to:

- Universe 1 (Carr anthology), a 1971 anthology of science fiction short stories edited by Terry Carr
- Universe 1 (Silverberg anthology), a 1990 anthology of science fiction short stories edited by Robert Silverberg and Karen Haber
