= Universe 7 =

1977 anthology edited by Terry Carr

- Cover of first edition
- Editor: Terry Carr
- Cover artist: Roger Zimmerman
- Language: English
- Series: Universe
- Genre: Science fiction
- Publisher: Doubleday
- Publication date: 1977
- Publication place: United States
- Media type: Print (hardcover)
- Pages: 184
- ISBN: 0-385-11414-1
- Preceded by: Universe 6
- Followed by: Universe 8

Universe 7 is an anthology of original science fiction short stories edited by Terry Carr, the seventh volume in the seventeen-volume Universe anthology series. It was first published in hardcover by Doubleday in January 1977, with a Science Fiction Book Club edition following from the same publisher in March of the same year, a paperback edition from Popular Library in August 1978, and a British hardcover edition from Dennis Dobson in August 1979.

The book collects eight novellas, novelettes and short stories by various science fiction authors.

== Contents ==
- "A Rite of Spring" (Fritz Leiber)
- "My Lady of the Psychiatric Sorrows" (Brian W. Aldiss)
- "Probability Storm" (Julian Reid)
- "People Reviews" (Rob Chilson)
- "Ibid." (George Alec Effinger)
- "The Marvelous Brass Chessplaying Automaton" (Gene Wolfe)
- "Brain Fever Season" (R. A. Lafferty)
- "The Ninth Symphony of Ludwig van Beethoven and Other Lost Songs" (Carter Scholz)

== Awards ==
"A Rite of Spring" was nominated for the 1978 Nebula Award for Best Novelette, and placed fourth in the 1978 Locus Poll Award for Best Short Fiction.

"The Ninth Symphony of Ludwig van Beethoven and Other Lost Songs" was a finalist for the 1978 Hugo Award for Best Novelette, nominated for the 1978 Nebula Award for Best Novelette, and placed eleventh in the 1978 Locus Poll Award for Best Short Fiction.
