= Fancies and Goodnights =

1951 book by John Henry Collier

- First edition cover
- Author: John Collier (fiction writer)
- Cover artist: Margot Tomes
- Language: English
- Genre: Speculative fiction • crime
- Publisher: Doubleday Books
- Publication date: 1951
- Publication place: United States
- Media type: Print (hardback & paperback)
- Pages: 364
- OCLC: 1310633

Fancies and Goodnights is a collection of fantasies and murder stories by John Collier first published by Doubleday Books in hardcover in 1951. A paperback edition followed from Bantam Books in 1953, and it has been repeatedly reprinted over more than five decades, most recently in the New York Review Books Classics line with an introduction by Ray Bradbury. A truncated British edition, omitting roughly one-quarter of the stories, was published under the title Of Demons and Darkness.

The collection is viewed as a classic of its genre. It won the International Fantasy Award for fiction and an Edgar Award for "outstanding contribution to the mystery short story." It compiles most of the stories from Collier's prior collections as well as seventeen previously uncollected stories, several original to the volume. Collier reportedly rewrote many of his early stories prior to book publication.

== Contents ==
- "Bottle Party" (Presenting Moonshine 1939)
- "De Mortuis" (The New Yorker 1942)
- "Evening Primrose" (Presenting Moonshine 1941)
- "Witch's Money" (The New Yorker 1939)
- "Are You Too Late or Was I Too Early?" (The New Yorker 1951)
- "Fallen Star" (original)
- "The Touch of Nutmeg Makes It" (The New Yorker 1941)
- "Three Bears Cottage" (original)
- "Pictures in the Fire" (original)
- "Wet Saturday" (The New Yorker 1938)
- "Squirrels Have Bright Eyes" (Presenting Moonshine 1941)
- "Halfway to Hell" (The Devil and All 1934)
- "The Lady on the Grey" (The New Yorker 1951)
- "Incident on a Lake" (The New Yorker 1941)
- "Over Insurance" (original)
- "Old Acquaintance" (Presenting Moonshine 1941)
- "The Frog Prince" (Presenting Moonshine 1941)
- "Season of Mists" (original)
- "Great Possibilities" (original)
- "Without Benefit of Galsworthy" (The New Yorker 1939)
- "The Devil, George, and Rosie" (The Devil and All 1934)
- "Ah the University" (The New Yorker 1939)
- "Back for Christmas" (The New Yorker 1939)
- "Another American Tragedy" (The New Yorker 1940)
- "Collaboration" (Presenting Moonshine 1941)
- "Midnight Blue" (The New Yorker 1938)
- "Gavin O'Leary" (chapbook, 1945)
- "If Youth Knew, If Age Could" (Presenting Moonshine 1941)
- "Thus I Refute Beelzy" (Atlantic Monthly 1940)
- "Special Delivery" (Presenting Moonshine 1941)
- "Rope Enough" (The New Yorker 1939)
- "Little Memento" (The New Yorker 1938)
- "Green Thoughts" (Harper's Magazine 1931)
- "Romance Lingers Adventure Lives" (original)
- "Bird of Prey" (Presenting Moonshine 1941)
- "Variation on a Theme" (chapbook 1935)
- "Night! Youth! Paris! and the Moon!" (The New Yorker 1938)
- "The Steel Cat" (Lilliput 1941)
- "Sleeping Beauty" (Harper’s Bazaar (UK edition) 1938)
- "Interpretation of a Dream" (The New Yorker 1951)
- "Mary" (Harper’s Bazaar 1939)
- "Hell Hath No Fury" (The Devil and All 1934)
- "In the Cards" (original)
- "The Invisible Dove Dancer of Strathpheen Island" (Presenting Moonshine 1941)
- "The Right Side" (The Devil and All 1934)
- "Spring Fever" (original)
- "Youth from Vienna" (original)
- "Possession of Angela Bradshaw" (The Devil and All 1934)
- "Cancel All I Said" (original)
- "The Chaser" (The New Yorker 1940)

== Reception ==
Anthony Boucher reviewed Fancies and Goodnights favorably for The New York Times, saying "the very best short stories of murder of this or almost any other year appear as a minority in a volume chiefly devoted to superlative supernatural fantasy." Time also reviewed the collection positively, declaring that "Though Author Collier sometimes tries to point a subtle moral in his tales, he is not so much a moralist as an entertainer. In his own little department of the bizarre, he is as good as they come." P. Schuyler Miller praised Collier as "one of the great individual talents in the modern literature of fantasy and the macabre."

Everett F. Bleiler characterized Collier as "One of the modern masters of the short story . . . [a] fine stylist, remarkable wit and ironist, obviously influenced by 18th century models," but noted that Collier's "extensive" rewriting and revision of his earlier stories "tend to tone down the language, with some loss of exuberance and zest."
