= If the Stars are Gods =

1977 novelette by Gordon Eklund and Gregory Benford

- Cover of the first edition
- Authors: Gregory Benford; Gordon Eklund
- Language: English
- Genre: Science fiction
- Publication date: 1977
- Publication place: United States
- Media type: Print

If the Stars are Gods is a science fiction book by American writers Gregory Benford and Gordon Eklund, published in 1977. It is an expansion of the Nebula Award-winning novelette, first published in Universe 4 (1974).

== Plot summary ==
If the Stars are Gods is a collection of stories about space explorer Bradley Reynolds, involving standalone two stories of Mars exploration and alien encounters, and interconnected sections about life systems on Jupiter.

== Reception ==
C. Ben Ostrander reviewed If the Stars are Gods in The Space Gamer No. 12. Ostrander said:

This book is for those who like their s-f sprinkled with logical, rational people, heavy on the theory with beginning, middle, and end. You can find all this and more. Serious fiction-recommended.

Lynn Willis reviewed If the Stars are Gods for Different Worlds magazine and stated that "Important monsters in role-playing games should be well-motivated if referees want a change of pace from hack'n'slash adventures. Twice in this book, in the Moon and Titan stories, new motives are considered; that is twice more than most books attempt."

== Reviews ==
- Review by Douglas Barbour (1977) in Vector 81
- Review by Richard Lupoff (1977) in Algol #29, Summer-Fall 1977
- Review by Brian Stableford (1978) in Foundation #14, September 1978
