= Georgia Wood Pangborn =

American novelist

Georgia Wood Pangborn (1872–1955) was an American writer of novels and short stories. She is known as a writer of horror and the macabre. She was the mother of Edgar Pangborn and Mary Pangborn.

== Life ==
Georgia Wood was born in Malone, New York, in 1872. She graduated from Smith College and married Harry Levi Pangborn in 1894. Pangborn lived for a time on Wall Street in Manhattan, New York, and was a member of the New York literary establishment. Her work was published in Scribner's Magazine, Harper's Monthly, and Colliers, among others. She died in Poughkeepsie, New York in 1955.

== Selected works ==
=== Short stories ===
- "The Gray Collie" (1903)
- "Cara" (1914)
- "The Rescue" (1912)
- "The Substitute" (1914)
- "The Intruder" (1907)

=== Collected works ===
- The Wind at Midnight (1999)
