= The Ninth Symphony of Ludwig van Beethoven and Other Lost Songs =

1977 science fiction short story by Carter Scholz

- Short story by Carter Scholz
- Language: English
- Genre(s): Science fiction

Publication
- Published in: Universe 7
- Publication type: Anthology
- Media type: Print
- Publication date: 1977

"The Ninth Symphony of Ludwig van Beethoven and Other Lost Songs" is a 1977 science fiction short story by Carter Scholz. It was first published in Universe 7.

== Synopsis ==
Time travelling musicologists enter the mind of Ludwig van Beethoven so as to observe the creation of his ninth symphony, but their presence changes things in unexpected ways, and the symphony is lost.

== Reception ==
"The Ninth Symphony of Ludwig van Beethoven and Other Lost Songs" was a finalist for the 1977 Nebula Award for Best Novelette and the 1978 Hugo Award for Best Novelette.
