= Fight for Your Lady =

1937 film by Benjamin Stoloff

- Theatrical release poster
- Directed by: Benjamin Stoloff
- Screenplay by: Ernest Pagano; Harry Segall; Harold Daniel Kusel
- Story by: Jean Negulesco; Isabel Leighton
- Produced by: Albert Lewis
- Starring: John Boles; Jack Oakie; Ida Lupino; Margot Grahame; Gordon Jones; Erik Rhodes; Billy Gilbert; Paul Guilfoyle
- Cinematography: Jack MacKenzie
- Edited by: George Crone
- Music by: Frank Tours
- Production company: RKO Pictures
- Distributed by: RKO Pictures
- Release date: November 5, 1937
- Running time: 66 minutes
- Country: United States
- Language: English

Fight for Your Lady is a 1937 American comedy film directed by Benjamin Stoloff and written by Ernest Pagano, Harry Segall and Harold Daniel Kusel. The film stars John Boles, Jack Oakie, Ida Lupino, Margot Grahame, Gordon Jones, Erik Rhodes, Billy Gilbert and Paul Guilfoyle. The film was released on November 5, 1937, by RKO Pictures.

== Plot ==
"Honest" Ham Hamilton needs money. A wrestling promoter in London, he places a wager and tells his champion Mike Scanlon to lose on purpose, but Mike wins anyway to impress Marcia Trent, an actress who has bet on him to win.

Hamilton ingratiates himself with Marcia and her betrothed, singer Robert Densmore, then sees Robert become suicidally depressed after Marcia leaves him for Mike. On a night In Budapest, a drunken Robert is persuaded by equally inebriated reporter Jim Trask make a play for a nightclub singer, Marietta, and incur the wrath of her jealous beau, Spadissimo. He will be challenged to a duel and that will grant Robert's wish to die.

Trouble ensues when Marietta becomes genuinely attracted to Robert and lies that his mother desperately needs him. Spadissimo takes pity until Marcia informs him Robert has no mother. The duel is on until Hamilton throws himself at the swordsman's mercy on Robert's behalf, disguised as his mother.

== Cast ==
- John Boles as Robert Densmore
- Jack Oakie as Honest Hamilton
- Ida Lupino as Marietta
- Margot Grahame as Marcia Trent
- Gordon Jones as Mike Scanlon
- Erik Rhodes as Anton Spadissimo
- Billy Gilbert as Boris
- Paul Guilfoyle as Paris Tribune Reporter Jim Trask
- Georges Renavent as Joris
- Charles Judels as Felix Janos
- Maude Eburne as Nadya
- Charles Coleman as Densmore's Butler
- Leona Roberts as Cleaning Woman
- Forrester Harvey as Referee
