= John Collier (fiction writer) =

British writer (1901–1980)

- John Collier, c. 1970s
- Born: John Henry Noyes Collier; 3 May 1901; London, England
- Died: 6 April 1980 (aged 78); Los Angeles, California, U.S.
- Occupations: Author; screenwriter

John Henry Noyes Collier (3 May 1901 – 6 April 1980) was a British-American author and screenwriter. He was best known for his short stories, many of which appeared in The New Yorker from the 1930s to the 1950s, often featuring macabre, fantastic or sardonic themes and twist endings. Many were collected in The John Collier Reader (Knopf, 1972); earlier collections include a 1951 volume, Fancies and Goodnights, which won the International Fantasy Award and remains in print. Individual stories are frequently anthologized in fantasy collections. He became an American citizen in December 1941.

John Collier's writing has been praised by authors such as Anthony Burgess, Ray Bradbury, Roald Dahl, Neil Gaiman, Michael Chabon, Harlan Ellison, Wyndham Lewis, and Paul Theroux. He appears to have given few interviews in his life; those include conversations with biographer Betty Richardson, Tom Milne, and Max Wilk.

== Life ==
Born in London in 1901, John Collier was the son of John George and Emily Mary Noyes Collier. He had one sister, Kathleen Mars Collier. His father, John George Collier, was one of seventeen children, and could not afford formal education; he worked as a clerk. Nor could John George afford schooling for his son beyond prep school; John Collier and Kathleen were educated at home. He was privately educated by his uncle Vincent Collier, a novelist. Biographer Betty Richardson wrote:

He began reading Hans Christian Andersen fairy tales at three; these began a lifelong interest in myth and legend that was further stimulated when, in his teens, he discovered James Frazer's The Golden Bough (1890–1915). An uncle, Vincent Collier, himself a minor novelist, introduced the boy to 17th and 18th century literature. Collier particularly admired Jonathan Swift, and an 18th-century satirist's view of life became his own. From his first work to his version of Paradise Lost, Collier saw humans, flawed but with potential, everywhere contaminated by narrow creeds, institutions, coteries, vanities, and careers.

When, at the age of 18 or 19, Collier was asked by his father what he had chosen as a vocation, his reply was, "I want to be a poet." His father indulged him; over the course of the next ten years Collier lived on an allowance of two pounds a week plus whatever he could pick up by writing book reviews and acting as a cultural correspondent for a Japanese newspaper. During this time, being not overly burdened by any financial responsibilities, he developed a penchant for games of chance, conversation in cafes and visits to picture galleries. He never attended university.

He was married to silent film actress Shirley Palmer in 1936; they were divorced. His second marriage in 1945 was to New York actress Beth Kay (Margaret Elizabeth Eke). They divorced a decade later. His third wife was Harriet Hess Collier, who survived him; they had one son, John G. S. Collier, born in Nice, France, on 18 May 1958.

== Career ==
=== Poetry ===
He began writing poetry at the age of nineteen, and was first published in 1920.

For ten years Collier attempted to reconcile intensely visual experience opened to him by the Sitwells and the modern painters with the more austere preoccupations of those classical authors who were fashionable in the 1920s. He felt that his poetry was unsuccessful, however; he was not able to make his two selves (whom he oddly described as the "archaic, uncouth, and even barbarous" Olsen and the "hysterically self-conscious dandy" Valentine) speak with one voice.

Being an admirer of James Joyce, Collier found a solution in Joyce's Ulysses. "On going for my next lesson to Ulysses, that city of modern prose," he wrote, "I was struck by the great number of magnificent passages in which words are used as they are used in poetry, and in which the emotion which is originally aesthetic, and the emotion which has its origin in intellect, are fused in higher proportions of extreme forms than I had believed was possible." The few poems he wrote during this time were afterward published in a volume under the title Gemini.

=== Fiction ===
While he had written some short stories during the period in which he was trying to find success as a poet, his career did not take shape until the publication of His Monkey Wife in 1930. It enjoyed a certain small popularity and critical approval that helped to sell his short stories. Biographer Richardson explained the literary context for the book:

His Monkey Wife is the last among light early-twentieth-century fantasies that include G. K. Chesterton's The Man Who Was Thursday (1908), Max Beerbohm's Zuleika Dobson (1911), and Virginia Woolf's Orlando (1928). Collier's book, however, appeared immediately after the economic crash and the start of the Great Depression in 1929, when the tone of the literary and intellectual world darkened. While his novel was well received, it did not achieve the fame of the earlier fantasies. ... Much in this novel echoes, without Swift's bitterness, the contrast between Gulliver and the rational Houyhnhnms in Gulliver's Travels (1726). Collier's style, however, is playful; he borrows heavily from Joseph Conrad, parodies the style of Thomas De Quincey ... and otherwise sustains the light and artificial tone by literary borrowings throughout.

As a private joke, Collier wrote a decidedly cool four-page review of His Monkey Wife, describing it as an attempt "to combine the qualities of the thriller with those of what might be called the decorative novel," and concluding with the following appraisal of the talents of its author: "From the classical standpoint his consciousness is too crammed for harmony, too neurasthenic for proportion, and his humor is too hysterical, too greedy, and too crude." Author Peter Straub has done the same with fake, negative reviews, in admiration of Collier.

His second novel, Tom's A-Cold: A Tale (1933) depicted a barbaric and dystopian future England; it is mentioned in Joshua Glenn's essay "The 10 Best Apocalypse Novels of Pre-Golden Age SF (1904-33)." Richardson calls it "part of a tradition of apocalyptic literature that began in the 1870s" including The War of the Worlds: "Usually, this literature shows an England destroyed by alien forces, but in Collier's novel, set in Hampshire in 1995, England has been destroyed by its own vices—greed, laziness, and an overwhelming bureaucracy crippled by its own committees and red tape."

His final novel, Defy the Foul Fiend; or, The Misadventures of a Heart, another title taken from the same speech in King Lear as Tom's A-Cold, was published in 1934. He received the Edgar Award in 1952 for the short story collection Fancies and Goodnights, which also won the International Fantasy Award in 1952.

=== Writing style ===
David Langford described Collier as "best known for his highly polished, often bitterly flippant magazine stories... [His] best stories are touched with poetry and real wit, sometimes reminiscent of Saki's. There are moments of outrageous Grand Guignol; the occasional sexual naughtiness is far beyond Thorne Smith in sophistication." Langford praises Collier's "smiling misanthropy". Similarly, Christopher Fowler wrote in The Independent, "His simple, sharp style brought his tales colourfully to life" and described Collier's fiction as "sardonic". John Clute wrote, "He was known mainly for his sophisticated though sometimes rather precious short stories, generally featuring acerbic snap endings; many of these stories have strong elements of fantasy..." E. F. Bleiler also admired Collier's writing, describing Collier as ""One of the modern masters of the short story and certainly the preeminent writer of short fantasies", and stating that The Devil and All was "one of the great fantasy collections".

== Other media ==
In the succeeding years, Collier traveled between England, France and Hollywood. He continued to write short stories, but as time went on, he would turn his attention more and more towards writing screenplays.

Max Wilk, who interviewed Collier for his book Schmucks with Underwoods, tells how, during the 1930s, Collier left the home he owned in England, Wilcote Manor, and traveled to France, where he lived briefly at Antibes and Cassis. The story of how Collier wound up going to Hollywood has been mistold sometimes, but Collier told Wilk that in Cassis,

"I saw a fishing boat I rather liked, and I wanted to buy it. They wanted 7000 francs. And I wondered where on earth I could find that much money. And would you believe, right then, some little girl came riding up on a bicycle to hand me a telegram....[sic] It was my London agent wanting to know, would I go to Hollywood to work for eight weeks, at $500 per week?... And I went out to California, and they were waiting for me. Delightful experience. A picture called Sylvia Scarlett, at RKO. George Cukor was the director. I'd scarcely seen a motion picture in my life; I didn't know a thing about screenwriting. In point of fact, it was something of a mistake. Hugh Walpole had told George I'd be right for the job. George thought Hugh was talking about Evelyn Waugh."

The film Sylvia Scarlett starred Katharine Hepburn, Cary Grant, Brian Aherne, and Edmund Gwenn; it was the comic story of a widower, his daughter Sylvia who disguises herself as a boy, and a con man; Collier's collaborators on the script were Gladys Unger and Mortimer Offner. Wilk writes that the film was considered bizarre at the time, but decades later, it enjoys a cult following.

Collier landed in Hollywood on May 16, 1935, but, he told Wilk, after Sylvia Scarlett he returned to England. There, he spent a year working on Elephant Boy for director Zoltan Korda.

"Korda took me into a projection room, and we sat there watching hours of film that had been shot in Burma...[sic] without the advantage of any script! Just a director with his crew, shooting film of elephants. So we saw elephants coming this way, elephants going that way, charging, retreating...[sic] Endless elephants! And there were some shots of a little boy, about three feet tall, a charming little creature. That would be Sabu.... Korda and I saw all this huge amount of film, and after about three hours of it, he began to utter hideous cries! What could he possibly do with all this goddamned film?"

Collier suggested a way to make the footage cohere into a story and to make "a star out of that little boy, Sabu." After these two unorthodox starts to screenwriting, Collier was on his way to a new writing career.

=== Screenplays ===
Collier returned to Hollywood, where he wrote prolifically for film and television. He contributed notably to the screenplays of The African Queen along with James Agee and John Huston, The War Lord, I Am a Camera (adapted from The Berlin Stories and remade later as Cabaret), Her Cardboard Lover, Deception and Roseanna McCoy.

== Awards ==
- Poetry award granted by the Paris literary magazine This Quarter for his poetry collection Gemini.
- International Fantasy Award for Fiction (1952) for Fancies and Goodnights (1951).
- Edgar Award for Best Short Story (1952) for Fancies and Goodnights (1951).

== Death ==
On 6 April 1980, four weeks before his 79th birthday, Collier died of a stroke in the Los Angeles neighborhood of Pacific Palisades. Near the end of his life, he wrote, "I sometimes marvel that a third-rate writer like me has been able to palm himself off as a second-rate writer."

== Collections of Collier's papers ==
- The Harry Ransom Humanities Research Center at the University of Texas at Austin's papers "represent his transition from a poet to writer of novels, short stories, and screenplays. The bulk of the papers are manuscripts covering several genres, although a substantial amount of correspondence is also included."
- University of Iowa Libraries, Special Collections
- Colliers' son, John G. S. Collier

== Bibliography ==
=== Novels ===
- His Monkey Wife: or Married to a Chimp (1930; currently in print, ISBN 0-9664913-3-5)
- No Traveller Returns (a chapbook, 1931)
- Tom's A-Cold: A Tale (1933) (published in the U.S. as Full Circle)
- Defy the Foul Fiend; or, The Misadventures of a Heart (1934)

=== Short fiction ===
==== Selected short stories ====
- "Another American Tragedy" – A man mutilates himself in order to murder an aged rich relative and impersonate him, to change the will in his own favor—only to discover he isn't the only one who wants the old man dead.
- "Back for Christmas" – A man plots a foolproof way to murder his wife, but the murder is exposed because of an unexpected gift she left for him to find. Originally published in The New Yorker (7 October 1939). (Grams erroneously cites a later publication, the 13 December 1939 issue of The Tattler [sic, for The Tatler].) This story has been dramatised many times: once for Alfred Hitchcock Presents, three times for the Suspense radio series (Peter Lorre portrayed the main character in the first broadcast in 1943; the 1948 and 1956 broadcasts both starred Herbert Marshall), as well as once for an episode of Tales of the Unexpected.
- "Bottle Party" – A jinn (genie) tricks a man into taking his place in the bottle.
- "Cancel All I Said" – A couple's young daughter takes a screen test. The couple's lives are torn apart by the studio head's spoken offer to make the child a star.
- "The Chaser" – A young man buying a genuine love potion cannot understand why the seller sells love potions for a dollar, but also offers a colorless, tasteless, undetectable poison at a much, much higher price.
- "Evening Primrose" – Probably his most famous; about people who live in a department store, hiding during the day and coming out at night. Betty Richardson wrote that the store is "the Valhalla, of course, of a consumer society ... populated by acquisitive people who pose as mannequins by daylight; by night, they emerge to grab what they want": "Happy to sacrifice all human emotions—love, pity, integrity—for the sake of consumer goods, these denizens have their own pecking order and police. The primary duty of the latter is to suppress any rebellion against this materialistic society." The story was read by Vincent Price and recorded on an LP record by Caedmon Audio in 1980. The story also served as the inspiration for the 1984 music video "Prime Time" by the British progressive rock band The Alan Parsons Project.
- "Interpretation of a Dream" – A man experiences disturbing and serial dreams of falling from the thirty-ninth story of the skyscraper in which he works, passing one story every night. In his dreams, he looks through the window and makes detailed and veridical observations of the real-life inhabitants as he passes.
- "Over Insurance" – A loving couple puts nine-tenths of their money into life insurance and becomes so impoverished as a result that each spouse decides to poison the other, unaware that the other has made the same decision.
- "Special Delivery" – A man falls in love with a department-store mannequin. This was later adapted for an episode of the 1960s TV series Journey to the Unknown, retitled "Eve", which starred Dennis Waterman and Carol Lynley.
- "The Steel Cat" – An inventor uses his pet mouse to demonstrate his better mousetrap to an insensitive prospect who insists on seeing the mouse actually die.
- "Three Bears Cottage" – A man tries unsuccessfully to poison his wife with a mushroom as retaliation for serving him a smaller egg than the one she served herself.
- "Thus I Refute Beelzy" – An odiously rational father is confounded by the imagination of his small son.
- "The Touch of Nutmeg Makes It" – A man tried for murder and acquitted for lack of motive tells his story to sympathetic friends.
- "Wet Saturday" – Stuck indoors on a rainy Saturday, a family must deal with a problem. The problem turns out to be murder, and how to frame an innocent visitor for the crime. Dramatised in the Suspense radio series broadcast on 24 June 1942 and 16 December 1943 featuring Charles Laughton, and as an episode of Alfred Hitchcock Presents broadcast on 30 September 1956. The episode was actually directed by Hitchcock himself. It was also later adapted for Roald Dahl's Tales of the Unexpected.
- "Youth from Vienna" – A couple, whose careers (tennis player and actress) depend on youth, are forced to deal with a gift of a single dose of rejuvenating medicine that cannot be divided or shared. This story was the basis for The Fountain of Youth, a 1956 TV pilot for a proposed anthology series, produced by Desilu and written, directed, and hosted by Orson Welles.

==== Collections ====
- Green Thoughts (1932)
- The Devil and All (1934)
- Variations on a Theme (1934)
- Presenting Moonshine (1941)
- The Touch of Nutmeg, and More Unlikely Stories (1943)
- Fancies and Goodnights (1951; New York Review Books paperback reprint [2003] currently in print, ISBN 1-59017-051-2) (Note: The first edition contains fifty stories, as do some paperback editions, including the Bantam paperback and the New York Review Books paperback edition. Note that Pictures in the Fire and The John Collier Reader contain a few stories not in any edition of Fancies and Goodnights. Also, a story appears in both The Devil and All and The Touch of Nutmeg, but is in no later collection.)
- Pictures in the Fire (1958)
- The John Collier Reader (1972) (includes His Monkey Wife in its entirety, chapters 8 and 9 of Defy the Foul Fiend, and selected stories)
- The Best of John Collier (1975) (paperback containing all the short items from The John Collier Reader, but without His Monkey Wife, which was issued as a separate volume)

=== Poetry ===
==== Collections ====
- Gemini (1931)

=== Screenplays ===
- Sylvia Scarlett (1935)
- Elephant Boy (1937)
- Her Cardboard Lover (1942)
- Deception (1946)
- Roseanna McCoy (1949)
- The African Queen (1951) (uncredited)
- The Story of Three Loves (1953) (Collier wrote two of three segments: "The Jealous Lover" and "Equilibrium")
- I Am a Camera (1955)
- The War Lord (1965)
- Paradise Lost: Screenplay for Cinema of the Mind (1973) (Note: An adaptation from John Milton that was never produced as a film. Collier changed the format slightly to make it more readable in book form.)

=== Teleplays ===
- "The Man in the Royal Suite" – Adapted by Collier from a novel by Edgar Wallace for The Four Just Men, 27 April 1960 (Season 1, Episode 27).
- "I Spy" – Adapted by Collier from the play by John Mortimer (of Rumpole of the Bailey fame) for Alfred Hitchcock Presents, 5 December 1961 (Season 7, Episode 9), starring Kay Walsh and Eric Barker.
- "Maria" – Written for Alfred Hitchcock Presents, 24 October 1961 (Season 7, Episode 3), starring Norman Lloyd and Nita Talbot.
- "The Magic Shop" – Adapted by Collier and James Parish from the 1903 story by H. G. Wells of the same title, written for The Alfred Hitchcock Hour, 10 January 1964 (Season 2, Episode 13), starring Leslie Nielsen and Peggy McCay.

== Adaptations ==
Collier's short story "Evening Primrose" was the basis of a 1966 television musical by Stephen Sondheim, and it was also adapted for the radio series Escape and by BBC Radio. Several of his stories, including "Back for Christmas", "Wet Saturday" and "De Mortuis", were adapted for the television series Alfred Hitchcock Presents. The short story "Green Thoughts" may have inspired The Little Shop of Horrors.

- "De Mortuis" – Adapted by Fred Coe for Lights Out, 1 September 1946 (Season 1, Episode 3), starring John Loder.
- "Mary, Mary Quite Contrary" – Adapted by James Lee for Lights Out, 27 March 1950 (Season 2, Episode 29), starring George Englund and Gaye Jordan.
- "Duet for Two Actors" – Adapted for The Billy Rose Show, 20 February 1951 (Season 1, Episode 21), starring Frank Albertson and Cyril Ritchard.
- "De Mortuis" – Adapted for Suspense, 12 June 1951 (Season 3, Episode 42), starring Olive Deering and Walter Slezak.
- "Bird of Prey" – Adapted by Nelson S. Bond as "Birds of Prey" for Gruen Guild Theater, 19 June 1952 (Season 2, Episode 7), starring Bill Baldwin, William Challee and Billy Curtis.
- "De Mortuis" – Adapted for Star Tonight as "Concerning Death", 17 February 1955 (Season 1, Episode 3), starring Edward Andrews and Jo Van Fleet.
- "Back for Christmas" – Adapted by Francis M. Cockrell for Alfred Hitchcock Presents, 4 March 1956 (Season 1, Episode 23), starring John Williams and Isobel Elsom.
- "Wet Saturday" – Adapted by Marian B. Cockrell for Alfred Hitchcock Presents, 30 September 1956 (Season 2, Episode 1), starring Cedric Hardwicke and John Williams.
- "De Mortuis" – Adapted by Francis M. Cockrell for Alfred Hitchcock Presents, 14 October 1956 (Season 2, Episode 3), starring Robert Emhardt, Cara Williams, and Henry Jones.
- "None Are So Blind" – Adapted by James P. Cavanagh for Alfred Hitchcock Presents, 28 October 1956 (Season 2, Episode 5), starring Hurd Hatfield and Mildred Dunnock.
- "Youth from Vienna" – Adapted, directed, and hosted by Orson Welles as "The Fountain of Youth," a 1956 television pilot for a proposed anthology series, broadcast on 16 September 1958 as an episode of Colgate Theatre (Season 1, Episode 5).
- "Anniversary Gift" – Adapted by Harold Swanton for Alfred Hitchcock Presents, 1 November 1959 (Season 5, Episode 6), starring Harry Morgan and Barbara Baxley.
- "The Chaser" – Adapted by Robert Presnell Jr. for The Twilight Zone, 13 May 1960 (Season 1, Episode 31), starring John McIntire, Patricia Barry and George Grizzard.
- "The Small Elephants" – Adapted by Russell Beggs for G.E. True Theater, 12 March 1961 (Season 9, Episode 21), starring Ronald Reagan as Host, Jonathan Harris, Barbara Nichols, Cliff Robertson, and George Sanders.
- "Evening Primrose" – Adapted by James Goldman as a 1966 television movie directed by Paul Bogart, starring Anthony Perkins, Dorothy Stickney and Larry Gates, with songs by Stephen Sondheim.
- 'Special Delivery" – Adapted by Michael Ashe and Paul Wheeler as "Eve" for Journey to the Unknown, 26 September 1968 (Season 1, Episode 01), starring Carol Lynley, Dennis Waterman and Michael Gough.
- "Evening Primrose" – Adapted by Jon Bing and Tor Åge Bringsværd as Nattmagasinet, a 1970 Norwegian television film.
- "Sleeping Beauty" – Adapted by James B. Harris as Some Call It Loving, a 1973 feature film starring Zalman King, Carol White, Tisa Farrow and Richard Pryor.
- "Back for Christmas" – Adapted by Denis Cannan for Tales of the Unexpected, 31 May 1980 (Season 2, Episode 14), starring Roald Dahl (Introducer), Richard Johnson, Siân Phillips and Avril Elgar.
- "De Mortuis" – Adapted by Robin Chapman as "Never Speak Ill of the Dead" for Tales of the Unexpected, 24 May 1981 (Season 4, Episode 8), starring Colin Blakely, Warren Clarke and Keith Drinkel.
- "Youth from Vienna" – Adapted by Ross Thomas for Tales of the Unexpected, 2 July 1983 (Season 6, Episode 13).
- "Wet Saturday" – Adapted by Collier for Tales of the Unexpected, 7 July 1984 (Season 7, Episode 8).
- "Bird of Prey" – Adapted by Ross Thomas for Tales of the Unexpected, 4 August 1984 (Season 7, Episode 10).
- "In the Cards" – Adapted by Ross Thomas for Tales of the Unexpected, 14 July 1985 (Season 8, Episode 2), starring Susan Strasberg, Max Gail, Elaine Giftos, and Kenneth Tigar.
- "Anniversary Gift" – Adapted by Rob Hedden for Alfred Hitchcock Presents, 28 February 1987 (Season 2, Episode 6), starring Pamela Sue Martin and Peter Dvorsky.
- "In the Cards" – Adapted by Andy Wolk as "Dead Right" for Tales from the Crypt, 21 April 1990 (Season 2, Episode 1), starring Demi Moore and Jeffrey Tambor.
