= The Quickening (short story) =

1981 short story by Michael Bishop

"The Quickening" is a science fiction short story by Michael Bishop. It was first published in 1981, in the anthology Universe 11.

== Synopsis ==
All humans have instantaneously been displaced to random locations throughout the world, and civilization has been destroyed. The story follows Lawson (a man from Lynchburg, Virginia who awoke in Seville, Spain) throughout the first years of the development of a new society.

== Reception ==
"The Quickening" won the Nebula Award for Best Novelette of 1981.

Paul Di Filippo considered the story "worthy of a Borges or Barthelme."
