= A Mirror for Observers =

1954 novel by Edgar Pangborn

- Dust-jacket from the first edition
- Author: Edgar Pangborn
- Cover artist: Daniel Schwartz
- Language: English
- Genre: Science fiction
- Publisher: Doubleday
- Publication date: 1954
- Publication place: United States
- Media type: Print (hardback)
- Pages: 222 pp
- Award: International Fantasy Award
- OCLC: 71336578

A Mirror for Observers is a science fiction novel by American writer Edgar Pangborn, winner of the International Fantasy Award in 1955. The plot concerns a philosophical conflict between settlers from Mars who attempt to influence human development.

== Publication history ==
The novel was originally published in hardcover by Doubleday in 1954, with a British hardcover following from Frederick Muller Ltd in 1955. The first American paperback was issued by Dell in 1958, the first British paperback by Penguin Books in 1966. Avon Books published a trade paperback edition in 1975. After paperback reissues from several publishers in the 1970s and 1980s, Old Earth Books released a hardcover edition in 2004, and Gollancz included the novel in its SF Gateway line in 2011. Mirror has been translated into French, German, Italian, and Dutch.

== Plot summary ==
A Mirror for Observers recounts the story of Angelo Pontevecchio, a child prodigy and "potential ethical innovator" caught between two contesting factions of Martians, Observers and Abdicators. The Martians, living secretly on Earth after evacuating their dying home world, have been trying to guide the development of human civilization for thousands of years. The novel is told from the point of view of Elmis, Angelo's designated Martian guardian, who must shield him from the malignant Abdicators.

== Reception ==
Boucher and McComas praised the novel, saying "The warmth, depth and perception of a true novelist have given wholly new life to the shopworn [premise]; and the fallible humanity of Pangborn's Martian Observers (from whose viewpoint the story is told) removes this from the paranoid Superman category and makes it a distinguished and moving novel of people [and] their common problems of free will". Groff Conklin declared A Mirror for Observers a "beautiful and moving book, saying that "Despite the bigness of the theme, the story is told in little details which make the tragedy all the more impressive." He noted, however, that the book was "more like a preliminary sketch of a much larger-scope novel than it actually is". P. Schuyler Miller described the story as "that oldest of gags, the 'aliens among us' gambit, done as it's never been done before and is unlikely to be done again".

New Worlds reviewer Leslie Flood complimented the British edition as "a book which has given me as much pleasure to read as any other in the past", citing "the tender commiseration for humanity and the understanding objectivity of Elmis himself".

John Clute found the novel successful, saying that "Pangborn's gracious literacy usually overcomes a tendency towards a cloying sententiousness. Gardner Dozois described it as "somewhat dated now, but still powerful". Jo Walton termed Mirror "deservedly a classic", saying "It’s the mood that I remember and that brings me back to it, the Martians and the humans, the tensions, the sense of time".
