= Davy (novel) =

1964 novel by Edgar Pangborn

Cover of the first edition, published by St. Martin's Press.

Davy is a post-apocalyptic science fiction novel by American writer Edgar Pangborn, nominated for the 1965 Hugo Award. It is set in the Northeastern United States some centuries after an atomic war ended high-technology civilization, with some scenes on an unnamed Atlantic island.

The novel is a bildungsroman, following its title character, Davy (who grew up a ward of the state and thus has no last name) as he grows to manhood in a pseudo-medieval society dominated by a Church that actively suppresses technology, banning "anything that may contain atoms."

Davy begins as an indentured servant in an inn, but escapes, and most of the novel is concerned with his adventures. The book is written as though Davy himself were writing his memoirs, with footnotes by people who knew him. Eventually he becomes involved with a group of liberal, freethinking people forming around a reforming young ruler (a hereditary "President") who tries to defy the dominant "Holy Murkan Church" - to be eventually overthrown by the reactionaries, the dissidents fleeing into the ocean and setting up a community on an island (apparently in the Azores).

The novel's post-apocalyptic setting was also used in the novel The Company of Glory (1975) (set several centuries earlier). The fall of old technological culture and the rise of the religion of "Abraham" is narrated in the 1954 story "The Music Master of Babylon". Numerous other short stories are set in that world. including those collected in Still I Persist in Wondering (1978)

== Reception ==
Algis Budrys gave Davy a mixed review in Galaxy Science Fiction, saying that while he enjoyed the novel and respected Pangborn, the book "achieves its marvelous effects by talking tough while following faithfully along a line of beloved cliches ... of the self-confident Establishment tickling itself". Budrys concluded that although Pangborn "had done a rare and wonderful thing in making his protagonist "a believable, impressive, vivid and memorable character", the novel became innocuous, "totally acceptable entertainment around characters and events which would actually have made the audience run in panic ... just the perfect cheap thrill".
