= Universe 16 =

1986 anthology of short stories edited by Terry Carr

- Cover of first edition
- Editor: Terry Carr
- Cover artist: Peter R. Kruzan
- Language: English
- Series: Universe
- Genre: Science fiction
- Publisher: Doubleday
- Publication date: 1986
- Publication place: United States
- Media type: Print (hardcover)
- Pages: 181
- ISBN: 0-385-23389-2
- Preceded by: Universe 15
- Followed by: Universe 17

Universe 16 is an anthology of original science fiction short stories edited by Terry Carr, the sixteenth volume in the seventeen-volume Universe anthology series. It was first published in hardcover by Doubleday in November 1986.

The book collects nine novelettes and short stories by various science fiction authors.

== Contents ==
- "Hotel Mind Slaves" (Ronald Anthony Cross)
- "At the Flood" (Rick Shelley)
- "The Idea Trap" (George Zebrowski)
- "What Genius" (Gary Konas)
- "Was That House Here Yesterday?" (Robert Thurston)
- "The Legend of the Seven Who Found the True Egg of Lightning" (Ian Watson)
- "Treading in the Afterglow" (Robert Reed)
- "Dress Rehearsal" (Martha Soukup)
- "Voyage South from Thousand Willows" (Lucius Shepard)

== Awards ==
The anthology placed sixth in the 1987 Locus Poll Award for Best Anthology.

"Hotel Mind Slaves" placed thirteenth in the 1987 Locus Poll Award for Best Novella.

"The Idea Trap" placed nineteenth in the 1987 Locus Poll Award for Best Short Story.

"Voyage South from Thousand Willows" placed eleventh in the 1987 Locus Poll Award for Best Short Story.
