= International Fantasy Award =

Former literary award

The International Fantasy Award was an annual literary award for the best science fiction or fantasy book and, in 1951-1953, the best non-fiction book of interest to science fiction and fantasy readers. The IFA was given by an international panel of prominent fans and professionals in 1951-1955 and then again in 1957.

== Winners ==
- 1951
  - Fiction: Earth Abides by George R. Stewart
  - Non-fiction: The Conquest of Space by Willy Ley & Chesley Bonestell
- 1952
  - Fiction: Fancies and Goodnights by John Collier
  - Non-fiction: The Exploration of Space by Arthur C. Clarke
- 1953
  - Fiction: City by Clifford D. Simak
  - Non-fiction: Lands Beyond by L. Sprague de Camp & Willy Ley
- 1954
  - Fiction: More Than Human by Theodore Sturgeon
- 1955
  - Fiction: A Mirror for Observers by Edgar Pangborn
- 1957
  - Fiction: The Lord of the Rings by J. R. R. Tolkien
