= Her Cardboard Lover =

1942 film by George Cukor

- Movie poster
- Directed by: George Cukor
- Screenplay by: Jacques Deval; John Collier; Anthony Veiller; William H. Wright
- Based on: Dans sa cadeur naïve 1926 play by Jacques Deval; Her Cardboard Lover 1927 play by Valerie Wyngate P. G. Wodehouse
- Produced by: J. Walter Ruben
- Starring: Norma Shearer; Robert Taylor; George Sanders
- Cinematography: Robert H. Planck; Harry Stradling
- Edited by: Robert J. Kern
- Music by: Franz Waxman
- Production company: Metro-Goldwyn-Mayer
- Distributed by: Loew's Inc.
- Release date: July 16, 1942
- Running time: 93 minutes
- Country: United States
- Language: English
- Budget: $979,000
- Box office: $973,000

Her Cardboard Lover is a 1942 American comedy film directed by George Cukor, starring Norma Shearer (in her final screen role), Robert Taylor, and George Sanders. The screenplay by Jacques Deval, John Collier, Anthony Veiller, and William H. Wright is based on the English translation of Deval's 1926 play Dans sa candeur naïve by Valerie Wyngate and P.G. Wodehouse.

The film is the third screen adaptation of the play, following The Cardboard Lover in 1928 and The Passionate Plumber in 1932.

== Plot ==
Songwriter Terry Trindale is attracted to Consuelo Croyden, a woman he sees nightly at a Palm Beach casino. He finally works up the courage to approach her and express his feelings, but she rebuffs his advances. When he later accrues a $3,200 gambling debt to her, Consuelo agrees to hire him as her secretary to work off what he owes her. One of Terry's duties is to assume the role of her fiancé in order to discourage the insistent attention of Tony Barling, to whom Consuelo once was engaged, and to keep her from succumbing to her former beau's charms.

Tony refuses to believe she loves someone else, and, when he recognizes Terry from the casino, his suspicions are aroused, despite Terry's outward displays of affection for Consuelo. Tony convinces her to join him on a friend's yacht, but Terry reminds her of his responsibility, and keeps her from going.

Four weeks later, Consuelo finds herself still saddled with Terry, who has refused to accompany his songwriting partner Chappie Champagne to New York City to promote their latest tune. Consuelo insists she no longer has any interest in Tony, and offers to cancel the rest of Terry's debt so he can join Chappie. Terry departs, and moments later, Consuelo receives a call from Tony and invites him to the house. Instead, it is Terry, who had disguised his voice, who arrives, and he berates Consuelo for her lack of self-control. Complications arise when Tony actually does arrive on the scene and finds Terry, wearing Consuelo's satin pajamas, in bed. When Terry refuses to admit the truth about the nature of his relationship with Consuelo, an angered Tony departs for his hotel, Consuelo follows, and Terry is not far behind. The two men engage in a brawl, and eventually are arrested.

During their hearing on charges of disturbing the peace and assaulting a police officer, Chappie arrives with money from the sale of their song to pay for Terry's fine. Tony proposes to Consuelo, but she realizes she is in love with Terry, who is arrested for grand larceny when he arrives at the airport with Chappie. The bogus charge, brought by Consuelo in order to stop Terry from leaving, is dropped, and the two embrace.

== Cast ==
- Norma Shearer as Consuelo Croyden
- Robert Taylor as Terry Trindale
- George Sanders as Tony Barling
- Frank McHugh as Chappie Champagne
- Elizabeth Patterson as Eva
- Chill Wills as Judge

== Production ==
The Broadway production of Her Cardboard Lover had been staged in 1927 by Gilbert Miller, with Jeanne Eagels and Leslie Howard in the leading roles. Although it ran for only 152 performances, the film rights were purchased by MGM for Marion Davies, and a silent film adaptation called The Cardboard Lover was released in 1928. A 1928 London tour of the play starred Tallulah Bankhead, with Leslie Howard reprising the role, running for 173 performances. In 1932, the play reached the screen in two versions: The Passionate Plumber, directed by Edward Sedgwick; and Le plombier amoureux, directed by Claude Autant-Lara, both starring Buster Keaton. In December 1934, MGM production chief Irving Thalberg announced his plan to adapt the play for a musical starring Maurice Chevalier and Grace Moore, but the project never came to fruition. Joan Crawford and Hedy Lamarr were offered the role eventually accepted by Norma Shearer, who selected The Cardboard Lover over Now, Voyager and Mrs. Miniver. The eventual commercial failure of George Cukor's remake prompted her to retire from the screen, although, at the time, she claimed she merely was taking an extended vacation.

The song "I Dare You" was written by Burton Lane and Ralph Freed.

Lobby card

== Box office ==
According to MGM records, the film made $637,000 at the US and Canadian box office, and $336,000 elsewhere, causing the studio take a loss of $348,000.

== Critical reception ==
Bosley Crowther of The New York Times observed: "Her Cardboard Lover may have been a charming bit of nonsense fifteen years ago, when Leslie Howard and Jeanne Eagels played it on the Empire Theatre's stage, [but] the years have not been kind to it, and neither have the present revivalists. For the screenplay by four weary writers is just a lot of witless talk, and the performance, under George Cukor's direction, is close to ridiculous. Miss Shearer either overacts deliberately, but without any comic finesse, or she has been looking at the pictures of fancy models in the high-tone fashion magazines. Mr. Taylor, who had finally gotten somewhere as an actor, is back where he began — back as a piece of well-dressed furniture compelled to make the most inane remarks." He later named it one of the year's ten worst films.

TV Guide rated the film 2½ out of four stars, and commented: "An ancient and overused farcical comedy, this story is handled with as much aplomb as can be expected from Shearer, Taylor, and Sanders; and even with Cukor as director, it still falls apart quickly. ... [Shearer] herself picked this moldering story out of the MGM vaults for reasons only [she] would know. It was a sad swan song to an otherwise illustrious career."
