= Karen Haber =

American novelist (born 1955)

- Haber at World Fantasy Convention 2026
- Born: January 7, 1955 (age 71)
- Occupations: Author; editor; art critic; historian
- Spouse: Robert Silverberg (1987–present)
- Writing career
- Genres: Science fiction; non-fiction
- Website: karenhaber.com

Karen Haber (born January 7, 1955) is an American science fiction and non-fiction author and editor, as well as an art critic and historian.

She is the author of nine novels including Star Trek Voyager: Bless the Beasts, and co-author of Science of the X-Men. Other publications include Exploring the Matrix: Visions of the Cyber Present, a collection of essays by science fiction writers and artists, and Transitions with Todd Lockwood, a retrospective of Lockwood's work.

In 2001, she edited a Hugo-nominated essay collection celebrating J. R. R. Tolkien, Meditations on Middle-Earth. With her husband, Robert Silverberg, she co-edited Science Fiction: The Best of 2001 and 2002 and the Fantasy: The Best of 2001 and 2002 for ibooks. She also later co-edited the continuation with Jonathan Strahan.

Her short fiction has appeared in Asimov's Science Fiction magazine, The Magazine of Fantasy and Science Fiction, and several anthologies. She reviews art books for Locus magazine and profiles artists for various publications including Realms of Fantasy.

== Publications ==
=== Short stories ===
- Madre De Dios (1988)
- Batman in Nighttown (1989) (with Robert Silverberg)
- A Plague of Strangers (1989)
- Inside Out (1992)
- Red Angels (1993)
- The Shores of Morning (1993, in The Further Adventures of Wonder Woman)
- My Husband Became a Zombie and it Saved Our Marriage (1994)
- On the Tip of a Cat's Tongue (1994)
- Doing the Angry Centipede (1995)
- First Contact, Sort of (1995) (with Carol Carr)
- The King Who Would Fly (1995)
- A Round of Cards with the General (1995)
- The Spell Between Worlds (1995)
- The Vampire of the Opera (1995)
- A Bone Dry Place (1996)
- Cézanne Was a Capricorn (1997)
- The Glyptodon's Quadrille (1997)
- Dog Is My Copilot (1998)
- A Killing Light (1999) (with Robert Silverberg)
- The Federal Spy And Miz Julia (2000)

=== Novels ===
- Thieves' Carnival (1990)
- Bless the Beasts (Star Trek: Voyager series, 1996)
- Crossing Infinity (2005)

=== Series ===
==== Fire in Winter ====
1. The Mutant Season (1989) (with Robert Silverberg)
2. The Mutant Prime (1990)
3. Mutant Star (1992)
4. Mutant Legacy (1992)

==== War Minstrels ====
1. Woman without a Shadow (1995)
2. The War Minstrels (1995)
3. Sister Blood (1996)

=== Non-fiction ===
- Science of the X-Men (2000) (with Link Yaco)
- The Art of Todd Lockwood: Transitions (2003)
- Kong Unbound (2005)

=== Edited books ===
- Universe 1 (1990) (with Robert Silverberg)
- Universe 2 (1992) (with Robert Silverberg)
- Universe 3 (1994) (with Robert Silverberg)
- Meditations on Middle-earth, essay collection celebrating J.R.R. Tolkien (Earthlight, 2001)
- Fantasy: The Best of 2001 (2002) (with Robert Silverberg)
- Scientific American's Secrets of the Periodic Table (2002)
- Science Fiction: The Best of 2003 (2003) (with Jonathan Strahan)
- Fantasy: The Best of 2002 (2003) (with Robert Silverberg)
- Exploring the Matrix: Visions of the Cyber Present, a collection of essays by leading sf authors (St. Martin's Press, 2003)
- Fantasy: The Best of 2004 (2005) (with Jonathan Strahan)
- Science Fiction: The Best of 2004 (2005) (with Jonathan Strahan)
- Science Fiction: The Best of 2005 (2006)
- Fantasy: The Best of 2005 (2006) (with Jonathan Strahan)

== Awards ==
Meditations on Middle Earth was nominated for the Hugo Award for Best Related Book in 2002.
