= Richard R. Smith =

- Born: United States
- Occupations: Management consultant, author and academic

Academic background
- Education: B.S. Industrial Management/Engineering; M.S. Organizational Behavior; Ph.D. General Management
- Alma mater: Purdue University; Pennsylvania State University; Singapore Management University

Academic work
- Institutions: Johns Hopkins University
- Website: www.profricksmith.com

Richard "Rick" Smith is an American management consultant, author, speaker, and academic. He serves as a professor of Practice at Johns Hopkins University (JHU), Executive Advisor to the Dean of the Johns Hopkins Carey Business School, and Founding Faculty Director of the Human Capital Development Lab.

Smith's research interests revolve around human capital as a strategic resource for competitive advantage with a focus on strategic management and leadership. He has authored publications, including Human Capital and Global Business Strategy, Rethinking the Business Models of Business Schools: A Critical Review and Change Agenda for the Future, and Strategic Human Capital Development in Asia: Building Ecosystems for Business Growth.

His work on cross-border leadership received media attention in Asia, featuring appearances on CNBC's Squawk Box and Talk Asia.

== Early life and education ==
Smith earned a B.S. in Industrial Management/Engineering from Purdue University, followed by an M.S. in Organizational Behavior from Pennsylvania State University. He graduated with a Ph.D. in General Management from Singapore Management University.

== Career ==
From 1984 to 1989, Smith held different positions at Jostens, an education products company. He then joined Accenture, where he served in various roles as a Partner in Resources Industries and Director in the Business Process Outsourcing business. He later assumed a regional role of managing director, Asia-Pacific, where he led country-based teams focused on the development of a pan-Asian growth model from 2009 to 2012.

Moving to Hong Kong, Smith served as Senior Vice President of Global Consulting Services at Manpower/Right Management from 2005 to 2007, followed by a brief start-up experience as CEO and managing director at SSI, Asia Pacific. During this time, he served as Director of the Young Entrepreneurs Development Council from 2007 to 2008 and was appointed to serve on the Singapore Government's Executive Task Force for Talent Development. Furthermore, his contributions extended to directorial positions at the International Consortium for Executive Development Research and the Singapore Civil Service College. He also served as Director of the Singapore Sports Council and participated in academic governance and education initiatives as an AAPBS Member and a representative for the FOME Alliance.

Smith began his academic career as an adjunct professor in the EMBA Program at Villanova University in 2001. He continued as Adjunct Faculty at Singapore Management University (SMU). At SMU, he held various roles, including Senior Lecturer in Strategic Management from 2012 to 2017 and Academic Director for both the Master of Human Capital and MS in Management programs from 2013 to 2018, before becoming Associate Dean for General Management Programs. His tenure extended to serving as a professor of Strategic Management and Deputy Dean of Programs from 2017 to 2020 and holding appointments such as Academic Fellow at the Singapore Academy of Continuing Education. Transitioning to JHU, he served as Vice Dean for Education and Partnerships until 2023, concurrently holding a Research Fellowship at the Indian School of Business since 2019. Since 2020, he has been serving as Professor of Practice, Executive Advisor to the Dean, and Faculty Director of the Human Capital Development Lab at JHU.

== Media ==
Smith has been featured in media publications and interviews, discussing topics such as decreasing remote work opportunities for highly skilled workers and exploring human capital in Asia on Channel News Asia, along with delving into the concept of the four-day workweek with Gray Television Network. His insights on HR's evolving role in the C-suite and remote work challenges for young employees were published in HR Daily Newsletter and The Hill.

== Research ==
Smith's research focuses on strategic management, human capital, management education, cross-border leadership, and talent management to enhance organizational performance through effective human capital management. He co-authored the book Human Capital and Global Business Strategy with Howard Thomas and Fermin Diez offering insights on blending theory with case studies to enhance business performance by leveraging human capital. Along with Kai Peters and Howard Thomas, he wrote Rethinking the Business Models of Business Schools: A Critical Review and Change Agenda for the Future, highlighting traditional education models and their modern challenges. In Strategic Human Capital Development in Asia: Building Ecosystems for Business Growth, he delved into country-specific contexts, providing insights into the drivers, challenges, and opportunities across the region.

In a large-scale study conducted in India, alongside Walter G. Tymon and Stephen A. Stumpf, Smith found that managerial support influences employee retention and career success. Their paper on HR programs in India highlighted the correlation between organizational practices, employee satisfaction, and intention to leave. In another study examining the impact of intrinsic rewards on employee satisfaction, they surveyed 585 employees and 31 team leaders across seven companies finding a positive correlation with intention to stay. Additionally, in collaboration with Benjamin Gan and Thomas Menkhoff, he examined web technology-based teaching methods at an Asian university, discussing the opportunities and challenges of integrating technology into higher education.

Smith explored the evolving significance of the Chief Human Resource Officer (CHRO) role within organizations, examining how CHROs leverage human capital for strategic advantage. He studied trust's role in fostering open performance-related feedback and discussions, acknowledging the challenge of maintaining trust in management as organizations expand. His research on "Quiet Quitting" explored its dual interpretations and implications for both employee engagement and employer strategies where he noted that the concept resonates particularly during the pandemic, as it prompts individuals to reflect on their priorities and the fragile nature of humanity. Furthermore, in his research with the Great Place to Work Institute on the post-pandemic workplace, he highlighted the inequalities, innovation challenges, and potential shifts in work schedules and locations, considering factors like trust, collaboration, and the global war for talent.

== Publications ==
=== Selected books ===
- Thomas, Howard; Smith, Richard R.; Diez, Fermin (2013). Human Capital and Global Business Strategy. Cambridge University Press. ISBN 978-1-107-03315-3.
- Peters, Kai; Smith, Richard R.; Thomas, Howard (2018). Rethinking the Business Models of Business Schools. doi:10.1108/9781787548749. ISBN 978-1-78754-875-6.
- Smith, Richard R. (2022). Strategic Human Capital Development in Asia. doi:10.4324/9781003184607. ISBN 978-1-003-18460-7.

=== Selected articles ===
- Tymon Jr, W. G., Stumpf, S. A., & Smith, R. R. (2011). Manager support predicts turnover of professionals in India. Career Development International, 16(3), 293–312.
- Doh, J. P., Smith, R. R., Stumpf, S. A., & Tymon Jr, W. G. (2011). Pride and professionals: retaining talent in emerging economies. Journal of business strategy, 32(5), 35–42.
- Stumpf, S. A., Tymon, W. G., Favorito, N., & Smith, R. R. (2013). Employees and change initiatives: intrinsic rewards and feeling valued. Journal of Business Strategy, 34(2), 21–29.
- Gan, B., Menkhoff, T., & Smith, R. (2015). Enhancing students’ learning process through interactive digital media: New opportunities for collaborative learning. Computers in Human Behavior, 51, 652–663.
- Smith, R. R., & Wong, A. (2017). Skyscanner: Globalising a business model. Asian Management Insights, 4(1), 48–52.
- Smith, R. R. (2019). Building trust for a positive employee experience. People Matters, 1–3.
- Smith, R., & Tan, S.C. (2019). Managing Across Borders in Asia. Asian Management Insights, Emerald, Vol 6-1, 32–37.
- Goh, K., Smith, R., Tan, C., & Dhevarajulu, D. (2020). Healthcare Innovation from the Inside-Out. Asian Management Insights, Emerald, Vol 7-2, 52–58.
