= Alex Jeffers =

American novelist and short story writer

- Occupations: Novelist; short story writer
- Relatives: Robinson Jeffers (grandfather)
- Writing career
- Notable awards: Lambda Literary Award (2014)

Alex Jeffers is an American novelist and short story writer. He is the grandson of Robinson Jeffers. His work has appeared in The Pioneer, the North American Review, Blithe House Quarterly, and Fantasy and Science Fiction. He also contributed to and served as an editor for the gay-oriented science fiction magazine Icarus, as well as overseeing the BrazenHead imprint of Lethe Press.

Jeffers's novel The Padishah's Son and the Fox received the 2014 Lambda Literary Award for Gay Erotica, while Deprivation; or, Benedetto Furioso: An Oneiromancy was also nominated in the Science Fiction category. Jeffers had previously been nominated for a Gaylactic Spectrum Award in 2010.

== Bibliography ==
- Safe as Houses (1995)
- Do You Remember Tulum? (2009)
- The New People (2011)
- The Abode of Bliss: Ten Stories for Adam (2011)
- You Will Meet a Stranger Far from Home: Wonder Stories (2012)
- Deprivation; or, Benedetto Furioso: An Oneiromancy (2013)
- The Padishah's Son and the Fox (2013)
- That Door is a Mischief (2014)
