= Edgar Pangborn =

American writer (1909–1976)

Edgar Pangborn (February 25, 1909 – February 1, 1976) was an American writer of mystery, historical, and science fiction.

== Biography ==
Edgar Pangborn was born in New York City on February 25, 1909, to Harry Levi Pangborn, an attorney and dictionary editor, and Georgia Wood Pangborn, a noted writer of supernatural fiction. Along with his older sister Mary, Edgar was homeschooled until 1919 and then educated at Brooklyn Friends School. He began music studies at Harvard University in 1924, when he was still only 15 years old, and left in 1926 without graduating. After that he studied at the New England Conservatory of Music, but did not graduate from that school, either. On leaving he publicly abandoned music, shifting his creative focus to writing. His first novel, A-100: A Mystery Story, was published under the pseudonym "Bruce Harrison" in 1930.

Over the next 20 years he wrote numerous stories for the pulp detective and mystery magazines. He also spent three years (1939–1942) farming in rural Maine, and three years (1942–1945) doing his World War II military service in the Pacific with the U.S. Army Medical Corps.

It was not until the early 1950s that Edgar "suddenly appeared" within the science fiction and mystery fields, publishing a string of high-quality, high-profile stories under his own name in prominent magazines like Galaxy Science Fiction, The Magazine of Fantasy & Science Fiction, and Ellery Queen's Mystery Magazine. His work helped to firmly establish a new "humanist" school of science fiction, and inspired a subsequent generation of writers, including Peter S. Beagle and Ursula K. Le Guin, who has credited Pangborn and Theodore Sturgeon with convincing her that it was possible to write worthwhile, humanly emotional stories within science fiction and fantasy.

In the 1960s Pangborn also began painting semi-professionally in oils, and exhibited portraits, nudes, and landscape paintings at local and regional art shows.

He continued to write until his death in Bearsville, New York on February 1, 1976, twenty-four days away from his 67th birthday.

In 2003, he was named winner of that year's Cordwainer Smith Rediscovery Award. In 2018, he was named a "Ghost of Honor" at WorldCon 76 in San Jose, California.

== Writing ==
Pangborn came from a writing family. His mother, Georgia Wood Pangborn, was a noted writer of ghost stories that appeared regularly in such popular mainstream periodicals as Scribner's Magazine, Harper's Monthly, Woman's Home Companion, and others. His father, Harry Levi Pangborn, worked as an editor of Webster's Dictionary. Words and literature were a part of the Pangborn household from the very beginning. As children, Edgar and his sister Mary carried on the tradition by writing an extensive series of fanciful, handwritten storybooks, often collaborating on these with each other and also their mother.

For the first 20 years of his writing career, which started when he was 21, Pangborn wrote what he referred to as "literary hackwork" for the pulp magazines. His serious work began in 1951, with the publication of his first science fiction story, "Angel's Egg", in Galaxy Science Fiction. The story of a race of tiny winged beings who come to Earth to help mankind, as told by a kindly biologist, it has been translated into six languages and reprinted more than twenty times. By 1954, Pangborn was well known and his second science fiction novel, A Mirror for Observers won the International Fantasy Award. This book is told from the point of view of a "Salvayan" (Martian) observer on Earth, who struggles with another Martian over the fate of a gifted young man. Galaxy reviewer Groff Conklin described Mirror as a "beautiful and moving book ... told in little details which make the tragedy all the more impressive."

From there Pangborn continued writing in science fiction and in other genres as well, including the historical novel Wilderness of Spring and the contemporary courtroom drama The Trial of Callista Blake. In 1954 Pangborn wrote "The Music Master of Babylon", a story set in the ruins of post-apocalypse New York and clearly related to Stephen Vincent Benét's 1937 "By the Waters of Babylon", already considered a classic.

Pangborn's best-known book, the Hugo-nominated Davy of 1964, is set in a much later part-time of that post-apocalyptic future. It is a picaresque bildungsroman set in a repressive theocratic society which developed out of the ruins of the destroyed old world. This post-apocalyptic world eventually became the backdrop for most of Pangborn's short fiction and his last novel, The Company of Glory (though not the Hugo-nominated "Longtooth", nor the 1971 Nebula finalist "Mount Charity").

Because of his educational background and early interests, Pangborn's works often deal with musical themes. Music plays a prominent role both in Davy and A Mirror For Observers, and the protagonist of "The Music Master of Babylon" is a pianist living alone in a ruined New York. Pangborn's works are also known for being humane and poignant in a way that nevertheless allows for some dark themes and raunchy humor.

In his introduction to Pangborn's posthumous story collection Still I Persist In Wondering, Spider Robinson observed: "[Pangborn] said again and again in his books that love is not a condition or an event or even a state of mind—that love is a country, which we are sometimes privileged to visit."

== Music ==
Pangborn never discussed his early musical training in detail with anyone in the science fiction, fantasy, or mystery fields. It was known that he studied the piano and violin, but that was all. In 2003, however, a large stack of handwritten music manuscripts were discovered in the attic of the Bearsville house in which he died. These manuscripts included original string quartets, sonatas, nocturnes, and other orchestral forms written by Pangborn during his music conservatory days.

== Bibliography ==
=== Tales of a Darkening World: The Davy series ===
- Davy (St. Martins's Press 1964); revised and expanded from the following linked novelettes:
  - "The Golden Horn" (F&SF, February 1962)
  - "A War of No Consequence" (F&SF, March 1962)
- The Judgment of Eve (Simon & Schuster 1966)
- "The World Is a Sphere" (novelette; published in Universe 3, ed. Terry Carr, Random House 1973)
- "The Freshman Angle" (novelette; in Ten Tomorrows, ed. Roger Elwood, Fawcett 1973
- The Company of Glory (novel; originally serialized in Galaxy, August 1974; slightly revised version published by Pyramid, January 1975)
- "Mam Sola's House" (novelette; in Continuum #4, ed. Roger Elwood, Berkley Putnam 1975)
- Still I Persist in Wondering (Dell, November 1978); a collection of linked stories:
  - "The Children's Crusade" (novelette; in Continuum #1, ed. Roger Elwood, Putnams 1974)
  - "Harper Conan and Singer David" (novelette; in Tomorrow Today, ed. George Zebrowski, Unity 1975)
  - "The Legend of Hombas" (novelette; in Continuum #2, ed. Roger Elwood, Putnams 1974)
  - "Tiger Boy" (novelette; in Universe 2, ed. Terry Carr, Ace 1972)
  - "The Witches of Nupal" (novelette; in Continuum #3, ed. Roger Elwood, Putnams 1974)
  - "My Brother Leopold" (novelette; in An Exaltation of Stars, ed. Terry Carr, Simon & Schuster 1973)
  - "The Night Wind" (novelette; in Universe 5, ed. Terry Carr, Random House 1974)

=== Other science fiction novels ===
- West of the Sun (Doubleday 1953)
- A Mirror for Observers (Doubleday 1954; winner of the International Fantasy Award for Best Fiction of 1954)

=== Mystery novels ===
- A-100: A Mystery Story (E. P. Dutton, 1930; as by "Bruce Harrison")
- The Trial of Callista Blake (St. Martin's Press, October 1961)

=== Historical novels ===
- Wilderness of Spring (Rinehart 1958)

=== Other collections ===
- Good Neighbors and Other Strangers (Macmillan 1972)
  - "The Good Neighbors" (short story; Galaxy, June 1960)
  - "A Better Mousehole" (short story; Galaxy, October 1965)
  - "Longtooth" (novelette; F&SF, January 1970)
  - "Maxwell's Monkey" (short story; Galaxy, October 1964)
  - "The Ponsonby Case" (short story; Ellery Queen Mystery Magazine, December 1959; also known as "The Naked Man in the Elephant House")
  - "Pick-up for Olympus" (vignette; in The Supernatural Reader, ed. Groff & Lucy Conklin, Lippincott 1953)
  - "Darius" (short story; Ellery Queen Mystery Magazine, July 1953; also known as "Mrrrar!")
  - "Wogglebeast" (short story; F&SF, January 1965)
  - "Angel's Egg" (novelette; Galaxy, June 1951)
  - "The Wrens in Grampa's Whiskers" (short story; F&SF, April 1960)
