= Jamil Nasir =

American novelist

Jamil Nasir is an American science fiction and fantasy author born in Chicago.

He has won a Grand Prix de l'Imaginaire for foreign novel and received a special citation from the Philip K. Dick Award.

== Novels ==
- Quasar (1995)
- The Higher Space (1996)
- Tower of Dreams (1999)
- Distance Haze (2000)
- The Houses of Time (2007)
- Tunnel Out of Death (2013)
