= Gordon Eklund =

American science fiction author

Gordon Eklund (born July 24, 1945, Seattle, Washington) is an American science fiction author whose works include the "Lord Tedric" series and two of the earliest original novels based on the 1960s Star Trek TV series. He has written under the pen name Wendell Stewart, and in one instance under the name of the late E. E. "Doc" Smith.

== Career ==
Eklund's first published SF short story, "Dear Aunt Annie", ran in the April 1970 issue of Fantastic magazine and was nominated for a Nebula Award. Eklund won the Nebula for Best Novelette for the 1974 short story "If the Stars Are Gods", co-written with Gregory Benford. The two expanded the story into a full-length novel of the same title, published in 1977.

Eklund's Star Trek novel The Starless World was the first Star Trek story about a Dyson sphere.

In his teens, Eklund was a member of a Seattle SF fan club, The Nameless Ones, and in 1977, Eklund was a guest of honor at the 1977 SF convention Bubonicon 9, in Albuquerque, New Mexico. The Cushing Memorial Library of Texas A&M University has a "Gordon Eklund Collection" housing the typed manuscript of the story "The Stuff of Time".

Eklund has retired from a long career with the U.S. Postal Service, and is considering writing full-time again. He's a member of the Fantasy Amateur Press Association and the Spectator Amateur Press Society.

== Awards ==
- 1971 Nebula (nomination) - Novelette "Dear Aunt Annie"
- 1975 Nebula - Novelette winner (1975) "If the Stars Are Gods" (with Gregory Benford)

== Quotes ==
Ted White, The WSFA Journal, September 2003: "Eklund is a major SF writer of long-standing (he was first professionally published in 1970), but he was a fan of some note for the decade that preceded his professional debut. In recent years he's combined the two to write fanfiction. 'Fanfiction' is defined here as 'fiction about fans'; this is its original definition and it still flourishes. ... Most of Gordon's previous pieces of fanfiction (all published in fanzines over the past 10 or more years) have been short and ironic."

== Bibliography ==
=== Novels ===
- The Eclipse of Dawn (1971)
- A Trace of Dreams (1972)
- Beyond the Resurrection (1973)
- Inheritors of the Earth (1974) (with Poul Anderson)
- All Times Possible (1974)
- Serving in Time also known as Laser Books No. 6: Serving in Time (Laser Books, 1975, ISBN 0-373-72006-8)
- Falling Toward Forever also known as Laser Books No. 10. Falling Toward Forever (Laser Books, 1975, ISBN 0-373-72010-6)
- Dance of the Apocalypse also known as Laser Books No. 46. Dance of the Apocalypse (Laser Books, 1976, ISBN 0-373-72046-7)
- The Grayspace Beast (1976)
- If the Stars Are Gods (1977) (with Gregory Benford)
- Twilight River (1979)
- The Garden of Winter (1980)
- Find the Changeling (1980) (with Gregory Benford)
- A Thunder on Neptune (1989)

=== Lord Tedric series ===
Series conceived by E. E. "Doc" Smith

- Lord Tedric (Baronet hardcover, June 1978, ISBN 0-89437-021-9; Ace Books paperback, November 1978, ISBN 0-441-49255-X)
- Space Pirates also known as Lord Tedric No. 2: Space Pirates (Ace Books, March 1980, ISBN 0-441-77760-0)
- Black Knight of the Iron Sphere also known as Lord Tedric III: Black Knight of the Iron Sphere (Ace Books, June 1981, ISBN 0-441-49256-8)
- Alien Realms (Star Books, November 1980, ISBN 0-352-30770-6) as E. E. "Doc" Smith

=== Star Trek ===
- The Starless World also known as Star Trek Adventures 3: The Starless World (Bantam Books, November 1978, ISBN 0-553-24675-5)
- Devil World also known as Star Trek Adventures 8: Devil World (Bantam Books, November 1979, ISBN 0-553-24677-1)

=== Anthologies with Eklund stories ===
- Universe 1 (1971)
- Universe 2 (1972)
- The Best Science Fiction of the Year 2 (1973)
- Chains of the Sea (1973)
- Universe 3 (1973)
- Universe 4 (1974)
- The Best Science Fiction of the Year 4 (1975)
- Nebula Award Stories 10 (1975)
- Universe 6 (1976)
- Universe 8 (1978)
- The Best Science Fiction of the Year 8 (1979)
- Beyond Reality (1979)
- Binary Star, No. 2 (Dell Publishing, 1979, ISBN 0-440-11090-4)
- First Contact (1987)
- The Science Fiction Century (1996)

=== Short stories include ===
- "Dear Aunt Annie" (Fantastic, April 1970)
- "West Wind, Falling" (1971) (with Gregory Benford)
- "Gemini Cavendish" (Amazing Stories, March 1971)
- "To End All Wars" (Amazing Stories, November 1971)
- "Grasshopper Time" (The Magazine of Fantasy & Science Fiction, March 1972)
- "Stalking the Sun" (1972)
- "Free City Blues" (1973)
- "The Shrine of Sebastian" (Chains of the Sea, 1973)
- "The Ascending Aye" (Amazing Stories, January 1973)
- "The Beasts in the Jungle" (The Magazine of Fantasy & Science Fiction, November 1973)
- "Moby, Too" (Amazing Stories, December 1973)
- "If the Stars Are Gods" (1974) (with Gregory Benford)
- "Tattered Stars, Tarnished Bars" (1974)
- "What Did You Do Last Year?" (1976) (with Gregory Benford)
- "Hellas Is Florida" (with Gregory Benford) (The Magazine of Fantasy & Science Fiction Jan. 1977)
- "Vermeer's Window" (1978)
- "Objects Unidentified" (Flying)" (1997)
- "The Cross Road Blues" (The Magazine of Fantasy & Science Fiction, February 1999)
- "Sense of Wonder" (Astonishing Trapdoor Stories #22; fanzine published mid-2003)
- "I Said I Was Sorry Didnt I" (The Magazine of Fantasy & Science Fiction, Mar./Apr. 2014)
