= Carter Scholz =

American novelist

- Born: September 22, 1953 (age 72); New York, U.S.
- Occupations: Writer, author
- Writing career
- Language: English
- Genre: Science fiction

Carter Scholz (born New York, 22 September 1953) is an American speculative fiction author and composer of music. He lives in California.

== Biography ==
Scholz grew up in Tenafly, New Jersey and graduated from Tenafly High School in 1971. He also attended Rhode Island School of Design.

He has published several works of short fiction (collected in The Amount to Carry, 2003) and two novels (Palimpsests 1984, with Glenn Harcourt; Radiance: A Novel 2002). He has been nominated for the Hugo and a Nebula Award for Best Novelette for his story "The Ninth Symphony of Ludwig van Beethoven and Other Lost Songs" (1977). He also co-wrote The Twilight Zone episode "A Small Talent for War" (1985) and was the co-author, along with Jonathan Lethem, of the short story collection Kafka Americana (1999).
