= Mary C. Pangborn =

American science fiction writer

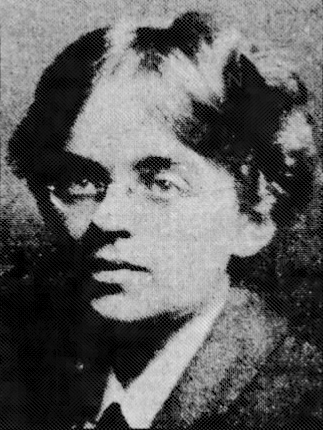
- In the Springfield Daily Republican, March 21, 1927
- Born: August 13, 1907; Brooklyn, New York, US
- Died: February 20, 2003 (aged 95)
- Education: Smith College, Yale University
- Occupation(s): Scientist, writer
- Relatives: Edgar Pangborn (brother)

Mary C. Pangborn (August 13, 1907 – February 20, 2003) was an American scientist and writer of science fiction.

== Youth ==
Born in Brooklyn, Pangborn attended the Friends School. Science fiction author Edgar Pangborn was her younger brother.

She graduated from high school at age 14, and entered Smith College a year later.

== Scientific work ==
At Smith, Pangborn received the Frances A. Hause prize for excellence in chemistry and was elected to Phi Beta Kappa. She graduated with a PhD from Yale in 1931. In 1942, she discovered the biologically important lipid cardiolipin.

== Fiction ==
Pangborn published at least one poem and, later in life, a number of pieces of short fiction in noted anthologies and in The Magazine of Fantasy & Science Fiction.

Her only novel, Friar Bacon's Head, remained unpublished as of her death.
