= Locus Award for Best Novelette =

Literary award for Science Fiction

The Locus Award for Best Novelette, first presented in 1975, is one of a series of Locus Awards given annually by Locus magazine. Awards presented in a given year are for works published in the previous calendar year.

== Winners ==
Award winners
Year	Novelette	Author	Publisher	Ref.
1975	Adrift Just Off the Islets of Langerhans: Latitude 38° 54' N, Longitude 77° 00' 13'' W	Harlan Ellison		
1976	The New Atlantis	Ursula K. Le Guin		
1977	The Bicentennial Man	Isaac Asimov		
1978	— (No award given)	—	—	
1979	The Barbie Murders	John Varley		
1980	Sandkings	George R. R. Martin		
1981	The Brave Little Toaster	Thomas M. Disch		
1982	Guardians	George R. R. Martin		
1983	Djinn, No Chaser	Harlan Ellison		
1984	The Monkey Treatment	George R. R. Martin		
1985	Bloodchild	Octavia Butler		
1986	Paladin of the Lost Hour	Harlan Ellison		
1987	Thor Meets Captain America	David Brin		
1988	Rachel in Love	Pat Murphy		
1989		Harlan Ellison		
1990	Dogwalker	Orson Scott Card		
1991	Entropy's Bed at Midnight	Dan Simmons		
1992	All Dracula's Children	Dan Simmons		
1993	Danny Goes to Mars	Pamela Sargent		
1994	Death in Bangkok	Dan Simmons		
1995	The Martian Child	David Gerrold		
1996	When the Old Gods Die	Mike Resnick		
1997	Mountain Ways	Ursula K. Le Guin		
1998	Newsletter	Connie Willis		
1999	The Planck Dive	Greg Egan		
1999	Taklamakan	Bruce Sterling		
2000	Huddle	Stephen Baxter		
2000	Border Guards	Greg Egan		
2001	The Birthday of the World	Ursula K. Le Guin		
2002	Hell Is the Absence of God	Ted Chiang		
2003	The Wild Girls	Ursula K. Le Guin		
2004	A Study in Emerald	Neil Gaiman		
2005	The Faery Handbag	Kelly Link		
2005	Reports of Certain Events in London	China Miéville		
2006	I, Robot	Cory Doctorow		
2007	When Sysadmins Ruled the Earth	Cory Doctorow		
2008	The Witch's Headstone	Neil Gaiman		
2009	Pump Six	Paolo Bacigalupi		
2010	By Moonlight	Peter S. Beagle		
2011	The Truth Is a Cave in the Black Mountains	Neil Gaiman		
2012	White Lines on a Green Field	Catherynne M. Valente		
2013	The Girl-Thing Who Went Out for Sushi	Pat Cadigan		
2014	The Sleeper and the Spindle	Neil Gaiman		
2015	Tough Times All Over	Joe Abercrombie		
2016	Black Dog	Neil Gaiman		
2017	You'll Surely Drown Here If You Stay	Alyssa Wong		
2018	The Hermit of Houston	Samuel R. Delany		
2019	The Only Harmless Great Thing	Brooke Bolander		
2020	Omphalos	Ted Chiang		
2021	The Pill	Meg Elison	Big Girl Plus..., PM Press	
2022	That Story Isn't the Story	John Wiswell	Uncanny (#43) (Nov/Dec 2021)	
2023	If You Find Yourself Speaking to God, Address God with the Informal You	John Chu	Uncanny (#47) (Jul/Aug 2022)	
2024	The Rainbow Bank	Uchechukwu Nwaka	GigaNotoSaurus (Aug 2023)	
2025	By Salt, By Sea, By Light of Stars	Premee Mohamed	Strange Horizons (June 2024)	
2026	We Begin Where Infinity Ends	Somto Ihezue	Clarkesworld 2/25	
