= Ace Science Fiction Specials =

Series of books published by Ace Books

- Author: Various
- Country: United States
- Language: English
- Genre: Science fiction, fantasy
- Publisher: Ace Books
- Published: 1968–1990
- Media type: Print (paperback)
- No. of books: 3 series (approx. 60+ titles)

Ace Science Fiction Specials is a series of science fiction and fantasy paperback lines published by Ace Books between 1968 and 1990. The series was issued in three runs, with editor Terry Carr overseeing the first (1968–1971) and third (1984–1990) series.

Four of the six novels were nominated for 1970 Nebula Awards.

== Series publications ==
The date given is the year of publication by Ace; some are first editions and some are reprints. Also given is the Ace serial number. The serial number given is that of the first printing in the Ace Special series (except for the reissue of Rite of Passage). Books with a previous first edition are noted as "reissue" below. The order listed for series one is the original order of publication. Ace reissued many of these books outside of the Ace Special line with different covers and prices, and sometimes different paginations.

=== Series 1 ===
- Clifford D. Simak - Why Call Them Back from Heaven? (1968, reissue from 1967, H-42, 60c)
- James H. Schmitz - The Witches of Karres (1968, reissue from 1966, A-13, 75c)
- R. A. Lafferty - Past Master (1968, H-54, 60c)
- Gertrude Friedberg - The Revolving Boy (1968, reissue from 1966, H-58, 60c)
- Wilson Tucker - The Lincoln Hunters (1968, reissue from 1958, H-62, 60c)
- Alexei Panshin - Rite of Passage (1968, A-16, 75c) Nebula Award winner
- Joanna Russ - Picnic on Paradise (1968, H-72, 60c)
- Bob Shaw - The Two-Timers (1968, H-79, 60c)
- D. G. Compton - Synthajoy (1968, reissue from UK same year, H-86, 60c)
- Piers Anthony and Robert E. Margroff - The Ring (1968, A-19, 75c)
- James Blish and Norman L. Knight - A Torrent of Faces (1968, reissue from 1967, A-29, 75c)
- James H. Schmitz - The Demon Breed (1968, H-105, 60c)
- Roger Zelazny - Isle of the Dead (1969, 37465, 60c)
- John Brunner - The Jagged Orbit (1969, 38120, 95c)
- Ursula K. Le Guin - The Left Hand of Darkness (1969, 47800, 95c) Hugo Award and Nebula Award winner; first edition of this title
- Philip K. Dick - The Preserving Machine (1969, 67800, 95c) collection
- Avram Davidson - The Island Under the Earth (1969, 37425, 75c)
- John T. Sladek - Mechasm (1969, reissue from 1968, originally The Reproductive System, 71435, 75c)
- D. G. Compton - The Silent Multitude (1969, 76385, reissue from 1967, 75c)
- Bob Shaw - The Palace of Eternity (1969, 65050, 75c)
- Keith Roberts - Pavane (1969, reissue from 1968, 65430, 95c)
- Michael Moorcock - The Black Corridor (1969, reissue from UK earlier in 1969, 06530, 75c)
- Alexei Panshin - Rite of Passage (1969, reissue from 1968, A-16, with "Nebula Award: Best SF Novel of the Year" on cover, 72781, 75c)
- R. A. Lafferty - Fourth Mansions (1969, 24590, 75c)
- D. G. Compton - The Steel Crocodile (1970, 78575, 75c)
- Joanna Russ - And Chaos Died (1970, 02268, 75c)
- Avram Davidson - The Phoenix and the Mirror (1970, reissue from 1969, 66100, 75c)
- Ron Goulart - After Things Fell Apart (1970, 00950, 75c)
- Wilson Tucker - The Year of the Quiet Sun (1970, 94200, 75c) (Retroactive Campbell Award in 1976)
- R. A. Lafferty - Nine Hundred Grandmothers (1970, 58050, 95c) collection
- Ursula K. Le Guin - A Wizard of Earthsea (1970, reissue from 1968, 90075, 75c)
- D. G. Compton - Chronocules (1970, 10480, 75c)
- Bob Shaw - One Million Tomorrows (1970, 62938, 75c)
- Clifford D. Simak - Why Call Them Back from Heaven? (1970, reissue from 1968, 88601, 75c)
- John Brunner - The Traveler in Black (1971, 82210 75c)
- Suzette Haden Elgin - Furthest (1971, 25950, 75c)
- Bruce McAllister - Humanity Prime (1971, 34900, 95c)
- Michael Moorcock - The Warlord of the Air (1971, reissue from UK earlier in 1971, 87060, 75c)
- Gerard F. Conway - The Midnight Dancers (1971, 52975, 75c)
- Gordon Eklund - The Eclipse of Dawn (1971, 18630, 75c)

Carr had purchased eight more books for the line, which Ace later published after the series was terminated. The Aldiss volume had been delayed due to issues over Canadian publishing rights, and eventually appeared with the Carr-commissioned Dillon cover.

- Brian W. Aldiss - Barefoot in the Head
- D. G. Compton - The Missionaries
- Gordon Eklund - A Trace of Dreams
- Fritz Leiber - You're All Alone
- Barry N. Malzberg - The Falling Astronauts
- Tom Purdom - The Barons of Behavior
- Bob Shaw - Other Days, Other Eyes
- Theodore Sturgeon - The Worlds of Theodore Sturgeon

=== Series 2 ===
This series was not edited by Terry Carr.

- Mary Staton - From the Legend of Biel (1975, 25460)
- D. D. Chapman and Deloris Lehman Tarzan - Red Tide (1975, 71160)
- Marion Zimmer Bradley - Endless Voyage (1975, 20660)
- Stanislaw Lem - The Invincible (1975, 37170)
- Felix C. Gotschalk - Growing Up in Tier 3000 (1975, 30420)
- Walt Richmond and Leigh Richmond - Challenge the Hellmaker (1976, 10150)
- Thomas Burnett Swann - Lady of the Bees (1976, 46850)
- Thomas Burnett Swann - The Tournament of Thorns (1976, 81900)
- William Barton - A Plague of All Cowards (1976, 66780)
- Chelsea Quinn Yarbro - Time of the Fourth Horseman (1976, 81189)
- Bob Shaw - Orbitsville (1977, 63780)

=== Series 3 ===
Terry Carr returned on a freelance basis to edit this series, all of them first novels.

- Kim Stanley Robinson - The Wild Shore (1984, 88870)
- Carter Scholz and Glenn Harcourt - Palimpsests (1984, 65065)
- Lucius Shepard - Green Eyes (1984, 30274)
- Howard Waldrop - Them Bones (1984, 80557)
- William Gibson - Neuromancer (1984, 56956) Nebula Award and Hugo Award winner
- Michael Swanwick - In the Drift (1985, 35869)
- Jack McDevitt - The Hercules Text (1986, 37367)
- Loren J. MacGregor - The Net (1987, 56941)
- Richard Kadrey - Metrophage (1988, 52813)
- Ted Reynolds - The Tides of God (1989, 80894)
- Claudia O'Keefe - Black Snow Days (1990, 06689)
- Gregory Feeley - The Oxygen Barons (1990, 64571)
