= Spear carrier =

Person of little significance

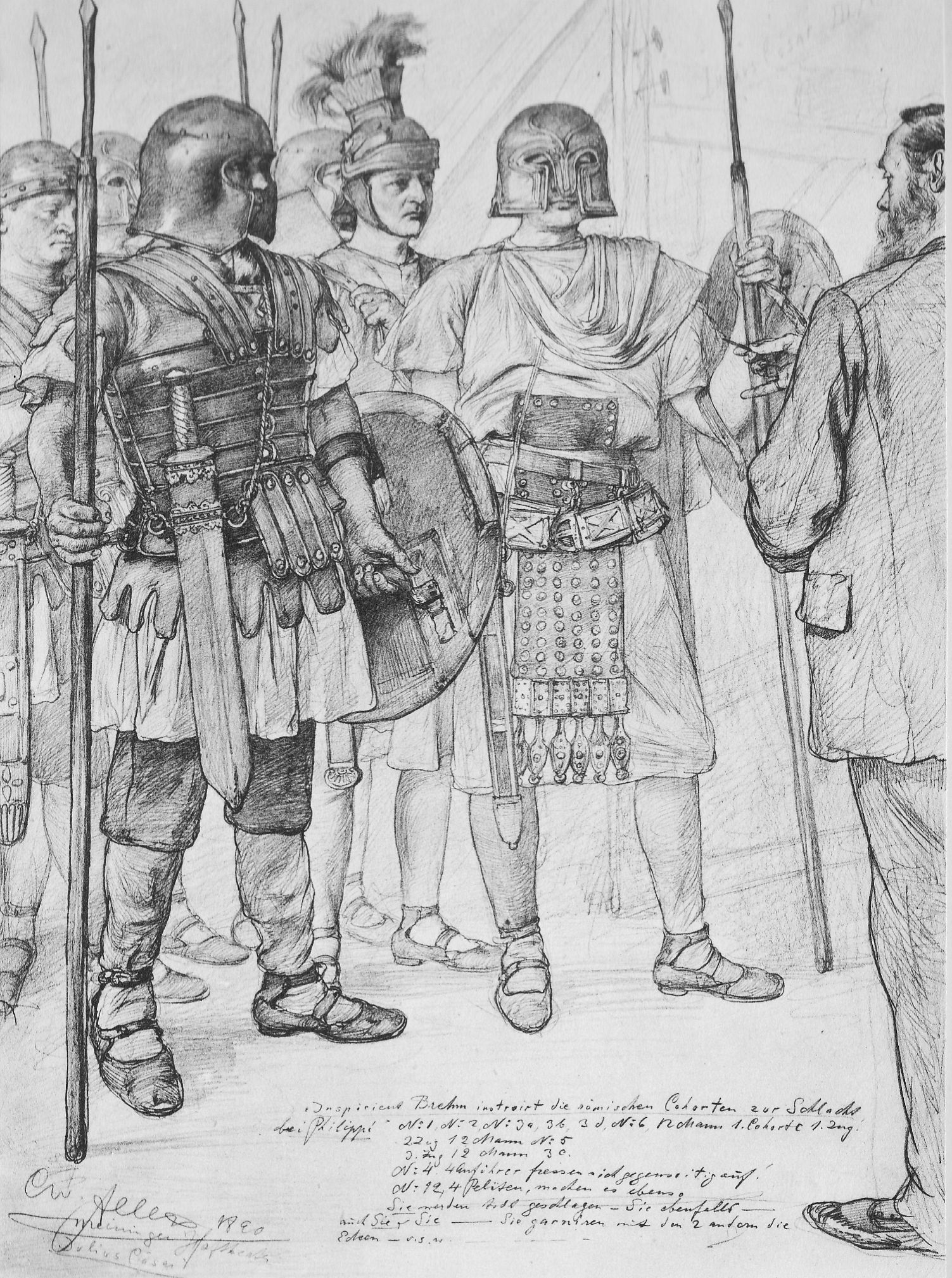
Actors with spears in an 1890 sketch of a production of The Tragedy of Julius Caesar

A spear carrier is a minor actor in a play or, by extension, a person whose actions are of little significance.

== Overview ==
In the world of opera, the term is sometimes used literally: When a male chorus is required, as in Aida, for example, the onstage "army", armed with spears or swords, usually consists of several singers and as many who remain silent, filling out the group. The silent ones are known as spear carriers, to differentiate them from the male chorus members.

The Ancient Greek term for spear carrier (δορυφόρος doryphóros, from δόρυ, "spear," and φέρω, "to carry") originally meant a soldier armed with a spear acting as a bodyguard or ceremonial guard to noblemen. The modern meaning has its roots in classical Greek tragedy; as plays such as Antigone and Oedipus Rex concerned the tragic fate of nobles, several undistinguished soldiers or guards were required to appear in the background, and the term was used to describe the guards who just escorted the main characters. The term has survived verbatim, but evolved in meaning from its metaphorical use, and today carries the general meaning of satellite in Modern Greek (for example, a natural satellite/moon orbiting another heavenly body or an artificial satellite orbiting the earth).

The 1968 Nebula Award-winning novel Rite of Passage, by Alexei Panshin, mentions the protagonist's observations of the role of spear carriers in real life:

A spear carrier is somebody who stands in the hall when Caesar passes, comes to attention and thumps his spear. A spear carrier is the anonymous character cut down by the hero as he advances to save the menaced heroine. A spear carrier is a character put in a story to be used like a piece of disposable tissue. In a story, spear carriers never suddenly assert themselves by throwing their spears aside and saying, "I resign. I don't want to be used." They are there to be used, either for atmosphere or as minor obstacles in the path of the hero. The trouble is that each of us is his own hero, existing in a world of spear carriers. We take no joy in being used and discarded. I was finding then, that wet, chilly, unhappy night, that I took no joy in seeing other people used and discarded.

== See also ==
- Supernumerary actor
- Extra (actor)
- Redshirt (stock character)
