= Cordwainer Smith Rediscovery Award =

Science fiction and fantasy literary award

- Awarded for: a science fiction or fantasy author whose body of work is deserving of renewed interest
- Presented by: Cordwainer Smith Foundation
- First award: 2001
- Website: www.cordwainer-smith.com/award.htm (no longer maintained)

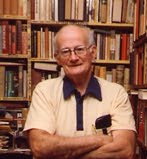
R. A. Lafferty with his library in Tulsa, c. 1985. Lafferty won this award in 2002

The Cordwainer Smith Rediscovery Award honors underread science fiction and fantasy authors, with the intention of drawing renewed attention to the winners. The award was created in 2001 by the Cordwainer Smith Foundation in memory of the science fiction author Cordwainer Smith. The first award ceremony was held at the Sydney Jones Library, University of Liverpool, and since 2002 has been awarded at the Readercon science fiction convention.

== Winners ==
- 2001: Olaf Stapledon
- 2002: R. A. Lafferty
- 2003: Edgar Pangborn
- 2004: Henry Kuttner and C.L. Moore
- 2005: Leigh Brackett
- 2006: William Hope Hodgson
- 2007: Daniel F. Galouye
- 2008: Stanley G. Weinbaum
- 2009: A. Merritt
- 2010: Mark Clifton
- 2011: Katherine MacLean
- 2012: Fredric Brown
- 2013: Wyman Guin
- 2014: Mildred Clingerman
- 2015: Clark Ashton Smith
- 2016: Judith Merril
- 2017: Seabury Quinn
- 2018: Frank M. Robinson
- 2019: Carol Emshwiller
- 2020: Rick Raphael
- 2021: D. G. Compton
- 2022: No award given due to cancellation of 2022 Readercon
- 2023: Josephine Saxton
- 2024: Clare Winger Harris
- 2025: Kris Neville
- 2026: Suzette Haden Elgin

== Judges ==
- 2001–2006 judges: John Clute, Gardner Dozois, Scott Edelman, and Robert Silverberg.
- 2007 judges: Martin H. Greenberg, Barry N. Malzberg, Mike Resnick, and Gordon Van Gelder.
- 2008–2011 judges: Martin H. Greenberg, Barry N. Malzberg, Mike Resnick, and Robert J. Sawyer.
- 2012–2018 judges: Elizabeth Hand, Barry N. Malzberg, Mike Resnick, and Robert J. Sawyer
- 2019 judges: Barry Malzberg, Mike Resnick, and Robert J. Sawyer
- 2020 judges: Barry Malzberg and Robert J. Sawyer
- 2021 judges: Rich Horton, Steven H. Silver, and Grant Thiessen
- 2023 jury: Ann VanderMeer, Steven H. Silver, Rich Horton, and Grant Thiessen
- 2023–2026 jury: Ann VanderMeer, Steven H. Silver, and Rich Horton
