= The World Beyond the Hill =

Book by Alexei Panshin

The World Beyond the Hill: Science Fiction and the Quest for Transcendence
- cover of The World Beyond the Hill
- Author: Alexei Panshin and Cory Panshin
- Language: English
- Genre: Literary criticism
- Publisher: Jeremy P. Tarcher
- Publication date: 1989
- Publication place: United States
- Media type: Print (Hardcover)
- Pages: 685 pp
- ISBN: 0-87477-436-5

The World Beyond the Hill: Science Fiction and the Quest for Transcendence (1989) is a book about the history of science fiction, written by Alexei Panshin and Cory Panshin.

== Publication ==
It was first published in hardcover by Jeremy P. Tarcher in August 1989 in a limited signed and numbered edition of 500 copies; a broader hardcover edition for general release and a trade paperback edition followed from the same publisher in the same year. An ebook edition was issued by ElectricStory.com in December 2002, and a new hardcover edition by Phoenix Pick in April 2010.

== Scope ==
It took the Panshins about ten years to research and write, though they had made earlier attempts at writing a book on the genre. The book considers the evolution of science fiction from Horace Walpole's 1764 fantasy The Castle of Otranto to modern science fiction writers through the middle of the twentieth century.

== Reception ==
The book received wide critical acclaim and won the 1990 Hugo Award for Best Non-Fiction Book.
