= Mildred Clingerman =

American novelist (1918–1997)

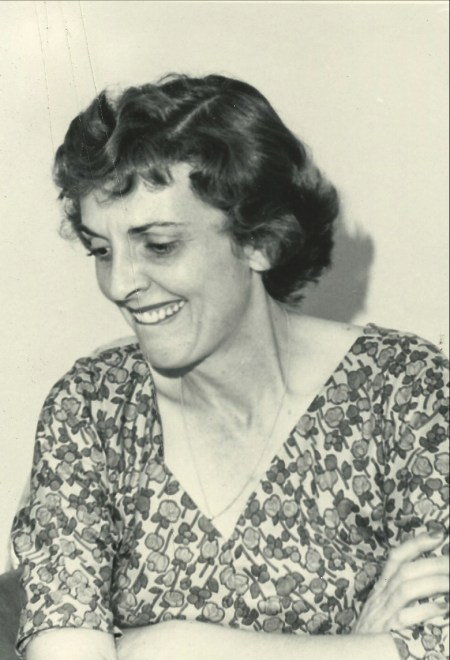
- Born: Mildred McElroy; March 14, 1918; Allen, Oklahoma, U.S.
- Died: February 26, 1997 (aged 78)
- Education: University of Arizona
- Spouse: Stuart Clingerman (m. 1937)
- Writing career
- Genre: Science fiction

Mildred McElroy Clingerman (March 14, 1918 – February 26, 1997) was an American science fiction author.

Clingerman was born Mildred McElroy in Allen, Oklahoma, and her family moved to Tucson, Arizona, in 1929. She graduated from Tucson High School and attended the University of Arizona. She married Stuart Clingerman in 1937.

Most of her short stories were published in the 1950s in The Magazine of Fantasy & Science Fiction, edited by Anthony Boucher. Boucher included her story "The Wild Wood" in the seventh volume (1958) of The Best from Fantasy and Science Fiction and dedicated the book to her, calling her the "most serendipitous of discoveries." Her science fiction was collected as A Cupful of Space in 1961. She also published in mainstream magazines like Good Housekeeping and Collier's. Her story "The Little Witch of Elm Street" appeared in Woman's Home Companion in 1956.

Married women are portrayed in stories like “The Wild Wood” (January 1957 F&SF) or “A Red Heart and Blue Roses” (original to her collection); they suffer violations of body space, male intrusiveness, and the impostures of aliens. Her stories have also appeared in several anthologies, including literature textbooks for middle and high school students. A 2017 anthology, The Clingerman Files, includes all of her originally published stories.

Clingerman was a collector of books of all kinds, especially those by and about Kenneth Grahame, and of Victorian travel journals. She was a founder of the Tucson Writer's Club and served on the board of the Tucson Press Club. She was posthumously awarded the Cordwainer Smith Rediscovery Award in 2014.

== Awards ==
2014 Cordwainer Smith Rediscovery Award

== Selected works ==
“First Lesson” (Collier’s Weekly, June 1955)

“Stickney and the Critic” (The Magazine of Fantasy and Science Fiction, February 1953)

“Stair Trick” (The Magazine of Fantasy and Science Fiction, August 1952)

“Minister Without Portfolio (The Magazine of Fantasy and Science Fiction, February 1952)

“Letters From Laura” (The Magazine of Fantasy and Science Fiction, October 1954)

“The Last Prophet” (The Magazine of Fantasy and Science Fiction, August 1955)

A Cupful of Space (Ballantine, 1961)

“Red Heart and Blue Roses” (The Magazine of Fantasy and Science Fiction, May 1964)

The Clingerman Files (2017)
