= Death Watch =

1980 film

- Theatrical release poster
- Directed by: Bertrand Tavernier
- Screenplay by: David Rayfiel; Bertrand Tavernier
- Based on: The Unsleeping Eye by D. G. Compton
- Produced by: Gabriel Boustiani; Janine Rubeiz; Bertrand Tavernier
- Starring: Romy Schneider; Harvey Keitel; Max von Sydow
- Cinematography: Pierre-William Glenn
- Edited by: Michael Ellis; Armand Psenny
- Music by: Antoine Duhamel
- Production companies: SELTA Films; Little Bear; Sara Films; Gaumont; Antenne 2 TV 13 Munich
- Distributed by: Tamasa Distribution
- Release date: 1980
- Running time: 128 minutes
- Countries: France; West Germany
- Languages: English, French
- Box office: $7.6 million

Death Watch (French: La Mort en direct, lit. 'Death Live') is a 1980 science fiction film directed by Bertrand Tavernier. It is based on the 1973 novel The Unsleeping Eye by D. G. Compton. The film was entered into the 30th Berlin International Film Festival. The film had 1,013,842 admissions in France and was the 35th most attended film of the year.

== Plot ==
The film is set in a near-future where death from illness has become rare. When Katherine Mortenhoe is diagnosed as having an incurable disease, she becomes a celebrity and is besieged by journalists. Vincent Ferriman, top executive at the television company NTV, offers her a large sum of money if she will allow her last days to be filmed and made into a reality television show called Death Watch. They have already secretly recorded her being told her diagnosis, as her doctor is colluding with them and has given her what are allegedly painkillers but will in fact make her increasingly ill. She accepts £300,000 cash upfront and, after giving the money to her husband, goes on the run in disguise. At a night shelter for down-and-outs she is found by Roddy.

The audience knows – but she does not – that Roddy is a senior NTV cameraman who has undergone an experimental implant of cameras and transmitters behind his eyes, so that everything he sees is fed back to NTV, who edit it for their reality show. Roddy has done this mainly for money to give his estranged wife and their son. A side-effect is that he will go blind if he experiences more than a short period of darkness, so he has to stay awake by shining a small flashlight on his eyes at night.

As Katherine is liable to be recognised in the city, she asks Roddy to take her far away into open country. In fact she is heading for the home of her first husband Gerald, whom she wants to see before she dies. To prepare for meeting him, she asks Roddy to go into a town and buy her some make-up. Dropping into a bar, he sees the primetime screening of Death Watch, and on his way back to their hide-out has an emotional breakdown, during which he throws his flashlight in the water. He is soon overcome with pain and tries helplessly to find the flashlight. Katherine comes to look for him and finds the flashlight, but it is too late and he goes blind. She guesses, and he admits, who he is and what he is doing.

As the feed to NTV has ended, Vincent takes off in a helicopter with a film crew to find the pair, who successfully evade them and reach Gerald's house. He knows about the TV show and, though deeply sad for Katherine, is glad she has come to him. Vincent telephones Gerald to say that, if she arrives, she is not dying and must stop taking the medicine. But Katherine has reached the end of the road: despite Gerald's pleas, she takes all the remaining pills and dies. When Vincent's helicopter arrives, it includes Roddy's wife, who takes care of her traumatised blind husband. Gerald promises to kill Vincent if he does not fly away immediately.

== Filming ==
Much of the filming took place in and around Glasgow, including: Glasgow Necropolis, Glasgow Cathedral, the former Queen's Dock on the River Clyde and the Glasgow City Chambers. In a scene where Katherine observes a playground, she interacts with one of the children, played by Schneider's son, David Haubenstock. The film is dedicated to deceased film director Jacques Tourneur.

== Home media ==
In 2012 Shout! Factory released the film on Blu-ray in Region 1, whilst Park Circus handled the Region 2 release.

== Cast ==
- Romy Schneider as Katherine Mortenhoe
- Harvey Keitel as Roddy
- Harry Dean Stanton as Vincent Ferriman
- Thérèse Liotard as Tracey
- Max von Sydow as Gerald Mortenhoe
- Caroline Langrishe as Girl in the Bar
- William Russell as Dr. Mason
- Vadim Glowna as Harry Graves
- Bernhard Wicki as Katherine's Father
- Robbie Coltrane as Limousine Driver
- Bill Nighy as Man in 'Harriet Scene' (uncredited)

== Reception ==
On review aggregator website Rotten Tomatoes, the film holds an approval rating of 79% based on 14 reviews, with an average rating of 6.6/10.

== See also ==
- List of films featuring surveillance
