= Le Zombie =

Le Zombie was an intermittent ("Published every time a zombie awakens") science fiction fanzine, of which 72 issues were published by science fiction fan and author Bob Tucker from December 1938 to August 2001. The first issue was a single, crudely mimeographed sheet; the last printed issue was published in December 1975 by planography. After a 25-year hiatus, Tucker resumed publishing in 2000; these last 5 issues (also referred to as eZombie, but preserving the same numbering sequence) were electronically published as a webzine. The title refers to the "Tucker death hoaxes" which played such a distinctive role in fan history.

Many phrases and fan writing techniques have their origins in the pages of Le Zombie, including the term space opera, and the use of the slash to indicate a thought was struck through. Beginning in mid-1942, Le Zombie, along with Harry Warner's Spaceways, began sponsoring the "Fanzine Service" as a way of distributing fanzines to people who were serving in the World War II.

In his obituary of Tucker, John Clute wrote: "It is only in recent years that academic critics have begun to come to terms with the huge amount of intellectual activity - along with pre-blog gossip - that filled [science fiction] fanzines, perhaps the most brilliant of them being Bob Tucker's Le Zombie."
