= Past Master (novel) =

1968 novel by R.A. Lafferty

- Cover of first edition paperback
- Author: R. A. Lafferty
- Illustrator: Leo and Diane Dillon
- Language: English
- Genre: New Wave science fiction, Dramatic fantasy
- Publisher: Ace Books
- Publication date: 1968
- Publication place: United States
- Media type: Print (hardback & paperback)
- Pages: 191 (first edition, paperback)
- ISBN: 978-0441653034
- OCLC: 8713622

Past Master is a science fiction novel by American writer R. A. Lafferty, first published in 1968. The novel follows the attempt of a future Utopian society in preventing its decline, by bringing Sir Thomas More to the year 2535.

The novel was well received by critics, and was nominated for the 1968 Nebula Award and the 1969 Hugo Award. It is generally categorized as part of the New Wave of science fiction.

== Plot introduction ==
Past Master is set in the year 2535 on the world of Astrobe, a utopian Earth colony that is hailed as Golden Astrobe, "mankind's third chance", after the decline of both the Old World and New World on Earth. Despite idealistic intentions, it is suffering moral and social decline that may be terminal for both Astrobe and the human race.

In an attempt to save their dying civilization, its leaders use time travel to fetch Sir Thomas More (chosen for his fine legal and moral sense) from shortly before his death in the year 1535 to be the president of Astrobe. More struggles with whether to approve of the Astrobian society, noting its possible connections to his own novel Utopia. His judgements soon lead him into conflict both with destructive cosmic forces on Astrobe and with its leaders who thought him a mere figurehead who could be manipulated.

== Synopsis ==
In the ruling hall of Astrobe, a perfect world beginning to unravel, the leaders debate. President Primo, Cosmos Kingmaker, and Fabian Foreman are men who believe in order, but not in truth. The Dream - Astrobe’s vast technocratic utopia - is faltering. Millions abandon its perfection to seek squalor or feral freedom.

They agree to retrieve a conscience from the past. The Fourth of the Three, a mysterious interloper named Thomas More, is drawn from the moments before his 16th-century martyrdom and brought across time. He arrives disoriented but calm, aware he is to be executed again—this time by a different kind of machine.

More steps into Astrobe’s gleaming air. He is met by Brother Paul, the mystic-monk envoy who guides him through the adjustment. The world is silent and smooth, its people content but hollow-eyed. More speaks in measured words, as though he has already seen these events in dreams.

He is told that he will be offered the presidency of Astrobe—not to rule, but to act as its conscience. A ceremonial “Past Master,” yet vital to the preservation of the Dream. He is also warned: Astrobe is cracking, and belief is a poison within it. He agrees to go forward.

Guided by Peter Proctor, a cynical spokesman-journalist, More begins to understand the world he now walks in. The city of St. Actas is golden, perfect, and false. No money, no aging, no war. But also: no faith, no art, no spontaneity.

People are labeled “Programmed Persons” or “Unprogrammed,” with the former dominant. All is managed by mindless efficiency. Souls are irrelevant, and history has been systemically suppressed. It is a world of comfort without meaning.

More, observing the sterile streets and empty laughter, asks: what became of God here? Proctor shrugs. There’s no place for Him anymore.

More demands to see Cathead, the slum-city where the unprogrammed have fled. It is dirty, loud, chaotic—but vibrant. People live there by choice. They bleed, weep, starve—and pray.

Here, More meets Evita, a strange girl who seems both child and oracle. She leads him through Cathead’s bowels, where makeshift altars flicker and men speak poetry into gutters. He also meets Adam, a boy who seems to die again and again, his identity shifting across scenes, hinting at the symbolic crucifixions that saturate the world.

Cathead’s people are sick, but free. Their suffering is real. More is moved.

As Cathead’s politics twist, More is warned about Copperhead, a man whose necromancy-like powers allow him to escape prisons and walk through walls. Copperhead becomes both enemy and foil, preaching disruption through manipulation.

A skirmish erupts in Cathead. Wreckers—a gang that honors chaos—attempt to overthrow an encampment. More witnesses the brutality firsthand. Despite the terror, he sees sparks of individual grace amid the wreckage.

The Dream is so devoid of soul that even this ugliness shines with strange light. When Evita asks if he will leave them to go rule, he does not answer.

Back in St. Actas, More is led into the wilderness by a sealion named Rimrock. Rimrock talks fluently, reads minds, and appears to be either the devil or a jester. He embodies the wisdom of fools.

Together, they visit the Feral Areas, where cities once stood, now overrun by nature and abandoned ideology. Rimrock explains that Earth failed first, then the New World, and now Astrobe. All three tried to perfect man without saving his soul. Rimrock tells him: “You are not here to rule. You are here to die properly.”

More is approached by Pottscamp, the emissary of Ouden, a metaphysical being whose name means “nothing.” Ouden represents the final god of the programmed: the end of belief, of self, of existence. The religion of the Dream is annihilation.

Pottscamp offers More the core temptation: help Astrobe outlaw belief in the afterlife. If man can be made to forget heaven, he can be made perfect.

More resists, but the snake (literally) is placed inside him. It curls in his gut, whispering. The memory of this encounter is half-scrubbed from his mind, but the impact lingers.

Returned to the city, More is offered the presidency by Cosmos and Foreman. He is given full authority—on the surface. But beneath, the machinery remains untouched. He is to be a symbol, not a sovereign. He is asked to sign a charter removing references to religion from law. It would complete the secularization of Astrobe. He refuses. Under Astrobe’s constitution, a president may veto three times. On the third, he must be executed. More smiles. He has been here before.

In a vast plaza, More is tried before a jury of Programmed Persons. He is charged with “disturbing the harmony of the Dream.” He delivers a slow, burning defense of conscience. He quotes Plato and Scripture, jokes in Latin, and weaves logic with paradox. The crowd is entranced. But the Programmed cannot understand. They are designed to reject mystery. He is condemned, and chooses not to appeal. To live would be to undo his stand.

Back in his chambers, Cosmos and Proctor plead with him. They offer him loopholes. A symbolic signing. A meaningless delay. He declines all. The third veto is sealed. The execution order is automatic. He walks to the execution platform, escorted by mute Programmed guards. In the square, a silence holds. Rimrock watches from a rooftop. Evita kneels. The Programmed raise the mechanism.

More speaks three words. We do not hear them. The blade falls.

Immediately, the city begins to fall. Lights flicker. Programmed Persons pause mid-step and collapse. Cathead’s slum-dwellers swarm the walls. The wilderness presses back against concrete. People scream not in fear, but in awakening. The false Dream has shattered. There is no longer perfection. But there is life. In the aftermath, Rimrock leads a slow parade into the heart of the city. Evita sings. Proctor burns his press notes.

Copperhead declares himself pope. Adam dies again, smiling. Astrobe breaks into fragments. The clean streets become gardens and ruins. Old rituals are reborn. The feral tribes declare independence. Programmed enforcers—those who survived—wander like ghosts, confused.

No single power rises. But no tyrant emerges either. Small communities try their hand at faith, debate, invention. Rimrock retires to a cave, dictating fables to a raccoon. Brother Paul claims to have seen More’s soul fly over the city in light. Pottscamp returns, shrieking that Ouden has been cheated. The sacrifice was supposed to validate the void. Instead, it sparked rebellion. Ouden’s agents, disconnected from logic, begin to dissolve. The Programmed system unravels itself. In one last temptation, Pottscamp offers More’s resurrected form to rule anew—if he will now endorse oblivion. He does not answer.

Years pass in a breath. Astrobe does not rebuild but reshapes. Its people re-learn farming, dreaming, failing. A group begins to write down More’s sayings, most of which he never said. A cult of conscience arises—not religious, not political, but something else. It spreads slowly. Copperhead disappears in the woods, muttering of dragons. Rimrock dies, his last words unintelligible. Evita grows old and dies beneath a tree she planted at the execution site. There is no final act. Just a boy walking in Cathead, humming an old song. Just a woman lighting a candle in an underground chapel. Just a city breathing again. In a dream, a child sees More sitting on a rock, smiling, saying nothing. The world did not end. It was never perfect. But it now lives. The last line of the book reads: “Be quiet … We hope.”

== Reception ==
The novel was generally well received by critics who praised both its style and story telling. R. D. Mullen commented that "The prose style is Besterian and page by page a joy to read, but the narrative technique is Vanvogtian not only in being pyrotechnic but also in being indifferent to causal consistency, and this is perhaps not the best technique for the theme." Judith Merril praised Past Master as "a complex, subtle, colorful, and highly sophisticated book", saying that "Lafferty magics me with humor, anger, and love, and with unpredictable corner-of-the-eye perspectives and perceptions, but above all, I suspect, with his word-music."

Algis Budrys criticized the book for not being longer because it did not depict More's thoughts, but concluded "It is good to see this kind of thing being written". P. Schuyler Miller declared the novel showed Lafferty "writing like the heir to 'Cordwainer Smith', yet always completely himself -- more macabre, more cryptic, with more of the humor of the incongruous [that] Samuel R. Delany calls 'ultraviolet' on the cover." Alexei Panshin found Past Master "an eccentric, idiosyncratic minor masterpiece", saying "it has all of Lafferty's usual color and pyramiding of manic invention" as well as offering "easily the most real immediate problem of spiritual agony yet seen in science fiction".
