= Supernumerary actor =

Non-singing roles in opera and ballet

Supernumerary actors are usually amateur character actors in opera and ballet performances who train under professional direction to create a believable scene.

== Definition ==
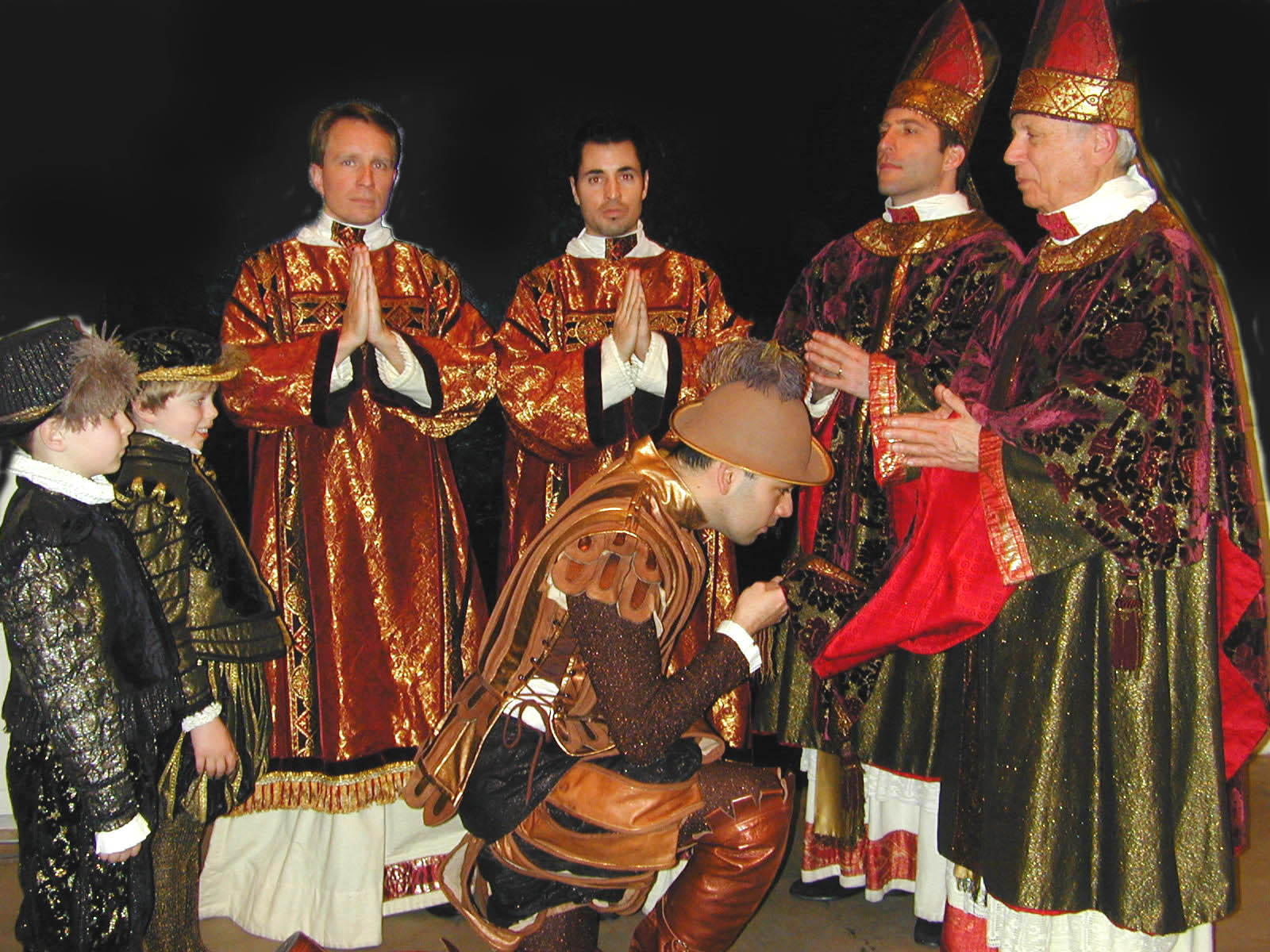
Supernumeraries rehearse a scene of Giuseppe Verdi's Don Carlos

The term's original use, from the Latin supernumerarius, meant someone paid to appear on stage in crowd scenes or in the case of opera as non-singing small parts. The word can still be found used for such in theatre and opera. It is the equivalent of "extra" in the motion picture industry. Any established opera company will have a supernumerary core of artists to enhance the opera experience. The Metropolitan Opera (Met) in New York and the Washington National Opera are known for their high profile and seasoned supernumeraries.

The WNO has had some major supernumerary personalities on stage such as U.S. Supreme Court Justices Ginsburg and Scalia.

== Typical supernumerary work ==
Supernumeraries are professional actors in major opera companies. At smaller opera companies, they could be amateur character artists who train under professional direction to create a believable scene. They populate the scene and give a sense of credibility to scenes where crowds, court assistants, lackeys, peasants or a variety of period characters are needed. Some operas require over 50 supernumeraries. Work is assigned according to the ability to deliver an understated performance that doesn't "steal focus from the main actors" but it is still vibrant and effusive.

== See also ==
- Spear carrier
- Actor
