= Synthajoy =

1968 science fiction novel by David G. Compton

- Ace Specials cover
- Author: David G. Compton
- Cover artist: Leo & Diane Dillon
- Language: English
- Genre: Science fiction
- Publisher: Hodder & Stoughton (UK); Ace Books (US)
- Publication date: 1968
- Publication place: United States
- Media type: Print (Hardcover, Paperback)
- Pages: 180 pp (US); 190 pp (UK)
- OCLC: 3224687

Synthajoy is a science fiction novel by D. G. Compton originally published in 1968 as an Ace Science Fiction Special in the United States and in hardcover by Hodder & Stoughton in Great Britain. An Italian translation appeared in 1972. Gregg Press issued an archival edition in 1977. Orion Books revived the novel as part of its Gateway line in 2011.

== Summary ==
The novel explores the social consequences of the development of a "virtual reality" technology "which enable[s] unremarkable people to enjoy the experiences of those who are more gifted or fortunate". The protagonist is the wife of the creator of Synthajoy, who - realizing what damage it would do to society - murdered her husband, and was committed to a mental hospital. In a 2007 interview, Compton recalled that it was likely based "on the sort of popular science stuff that I as a non-scientist would have picked up out of the media or the general press and latched onto as something I could develop".

== Reception ==
James Blish wrote that "[N]obody has handled [the novel's theme] a tenth as well as this English writer." George Edward Slusser characterized Synthajoy as a precursor to cyberpunk.
