= Why Call Them Back from Heaven? =

1967 novel by Clifford D. Simak

Why Call Them Back From Heaven?
- Ace SF Special cover
- Author: Clifford D. Simak
- Cover artist: Leo and Diane Dillon
- Language: English
- Genre: Science fiction
- Publisher: Doubleday/Ace
- Publication date: 1967
- Publication place: United States
- Media type: Print (hardback & paperback)

Why Call them Back From Heaven? is a 1967 science fiction novel by American writer Clifford D. Simak. It was the initial volume in the Ace Science Fiction Specials line.

== Publication history ==
It was originally published in hardcover by Doubleday in 1967, with the Ace Special and Science Fiction Book Club UK editions following in 1968. A British hardcover was also published by Gollancz in 1967, with a Pan Books paperback appearing in 1970. German and Portuguese translations were published in 1967; a French translation followed in 1969, and an Italian translation in 1978. Several more paperback reprints appeared in the 1980s.

== Plot ==
In Why Call Them Back From Heaven, Simak establishes a society where "science has displaced religion by providing a means of resurrection at the cost of all human values". The people of this future world no longer take chances because they might be dangerous, and forgo all pleasures in order to save enough money to be preserved for their second life. A man convicted of a horrible crime is given the worst sentence possible: he will not be permitted to store himself for a second life; otherwise, his rights are unaffected. The novel "explores differing concepts of 'immortality' and the relationship between belief-in-survival (whether in the flesh or spirit) and social mores".

== Reviews ==
Judith Merril praised the novel's "beautifully balanced opening, in which character, plot, and context form an inner-motivated unity", but faulted the lengthy "disappointing action-adventure midsection", which led to an "extremely provocative, though sketchy, conclusion". Algis Budrys said that the novel was an example of how "Simak's strengths as a short story writer often expose weaknesses in what he does as a novelist", with only a few good scenes.
