= The Demon Breed =

Book by James H. Schmitz

- Cover of first edition (Ace Special)
- Author: James H. Schmitz
- Cover artist: Leo & Diane Dillon
- Language: English
- Genre: Science fiction novel
- Publisher: Ace Books
- Publication date: 1968
- Publication place: United States
- Media type: Print (Paperback)
- Pages: 157 pp
- OCLC: 34154618

The Demon Breed is a 1968 science fiction novel by James H. Schmitz, originally serialized in Analog in a shorter form as "The Tuvela". It was first published in paperback in the Ace Science Fiction Specials line, with a Science Fiction Book Club edition following in 1969. MacDonald & Co. issued a British hardcover the same year, reprinting it as a Futura paperback in 1974. A Dutch translation, Des Duivels, appeared in 1971, and a French translation, Race démoniaque, in 1973. Ace reissued its edition in 1979 and 1981. In 2001, Baen Books compiled the novel in its paperback omnibus The Hub: Dangerous Territory.

Part of Schmitz's "Hub" sequence, The Demon Breed centers on the conflict between the Parahuans—a "physically powerful, resourceful, technically advanced and fearfully cruel" nonhuman species—and a human-colonized water world. It shares characters and setting with Schmitz's 1965 novella "Trouble Tide".

Schmitz specialized in strong female characters, but the Nyles Etland character in The Demon Breed was ultra-competent and represents to this day what every woman can strive to be, making this book possibly the earliest instance of feminist science fiction. This novel is Schmitz' least known story, likely because in order to read it, one must learn about the complex environment of the planet on which it takes place. Its main character, a woman named Nyles Etland, had no special advantages such as psionic powers. It was her intelligence and intimate knowledge of her home environment, as well as of science, and of another person involved, that allowed her to intimidate an alien species.

James Blish praised the novel, writing that its protagonist is "very well realized" and that "Schmitz's style is a joy -- precise, flexible, colorful, and frequently witty". He noted that the novel's title was double-edged, because Schmitz was exploring a theme "dear to the hearts of both Heinlein and Campbell . . . that human beings are the toughest, most vicious race anyone is ever likely to encounter".
