= Hilary Bailey =

British writer, critic and editor (1936–2017)

- Born: 19 September 1936; Hayes, Bromley, Kent, England
- Died: 11 January 2017 (aged 80)
- Education: Newnham College, Cambridge
- Occupations: Writer, critic and editor
- Spouse: Michael Moorcock (m. 1962; div. 1978)
- Children: 3
- Writing career
- Notable works: Frankenstein's Bride (1995); Mrs Rochester (1997); Fifty-First State (2008)

Hilary Bailey (19 September 1936 – 11 January 2017) was a British writer, critic and editor. She edited volumes 7–10 of the New Worlds Quarterly science-fiction series, and was co-author of The Black Corridor (1969) with Michael Moorcock, to whom she was married from 1962 to 1978. She was the author of numerous other works of fiction, including Polly Put the Kettle On (1975), Mrs Mulvaney (1978), All the Days of My Life (1984) and Hannie Richards, Or, The Intrepid Adventures of a Restless Wife (1985), in addition to a 1987 biography of Vera Brittain. Bailey's work characteristically has a focus on women, including sequels and reimaginings of classic novels by Mary Shelley and Charlotte Brontë.

== Life ==
Hilary Bailey was born in Hayes, Bromley, Kent, England. She attended Newnham College, Cambridge, where she was a founder-member of the Cambridge University Women's Union.

Bailey's books include Polly Put the Kettle On (1975), Mrs Mulvaney (1978), Hannie Richards (1985) and All the Days of My Life (1984), with a heroine who suffers the fate of all women who step away from what is expected of them. She wrote a biography of Vera Brittain, and sequels to Mary Shelley's Frankenstein, to Charlotte Brontë's Jane Eyre (the 1997 novel Mrs Rochester) and to Henry James's The Turn of the Screw, with a novel called Miles and Flora, which takes place some time after the original and resurrects one of the main characters.

As a critic, Bailey reviewed chiefly for The Guardian, she was active in the so-called New Wave of science fiction and edited volumes 7–10 of the New Worlds Quarterly series, and was co-author of The Black Corridor (1969) with Michael Moorcock, to whom she was married from 1962 to 1978.

Two of Bailey's science fiction short stories appeared in anthologies edited by Terry Carr. The anthology titles are On Our Way to the Future (1970) and Universe 5 (1974). She was a prominent and much-anthologised writer associated with the science fiction New Wave.

She was working on the final edit of North Sea Island, the sequel to her dystopian novel Fifty-First State (2008), when she died.

Bailey had three children, Sophie, Kate and Max, as well as three grandchildren Alex, Tom and Bobby.

== Archives ==
The archive of Hilary Bailey is held at the Bodleian Libraries, Oxford.

== Books ==
- Polly Put the Kettle On (1975)
- Mrs. Mulvaney (1978)
- All the Days of My Life (1984)
- Hannie Richards, Or, The Intrepid Adventures of a Restless Wife (1985)
- The Giant Book of Stories (1986)
- Vera Brittain: The Story of the Woman Who Wrote Testament of Youth (non-fiction) (1987)
- As Time Goes By (1988)
- A Stranger to Herself (1989)(aka She Was a Dreadful Woman)
- In Search of Love, Money and Revenge (1990)
- The Cry from Street to Street (1992)
- Cassandra: Princess of Troy (1993)
- Frankenstein's Bride: The Sequel to Mary Shelley's Frankenstein (1995)
- Miles and Flora: A Sequel to Henry James' The Turn of the Screw (1997)
- Mrs. Rochester: A Sequel to Charlotte Brontë's Jane Eyre (1997)
- Elizabeth and Lily (1997)
- After the Cabaret (1998)
- Connections (2000)
- Fifty-First State (2008)
- Diana: The Ghost Biography (2009)
- Strange Adventures of Charlotte Holmes (2012)
- Did We Meet on Grub Street?: A Publishing Miscellany (2014)

== Short stories ==
- Breakdown (1963)
- The Fall of Frenchy Steiner (1964)
- In Reason's Ear (1965) (as Pippin Graham)
- Be Good Sweet Man (1966)
- Devil of a Drummer (1967)
- The Little Victims (1967)
- Dr. Gelabius (1968)
- Agatha Blue (1970)
- Dogman of Islington (1970)
- Twenty-Four Letters from Underneath the Earth (1971)
- A Chronicle of Blackton (1972)
- Bella Goes to the Dark Tower (1973)
- On Board the Good Ship Venus (1974)
- The Ramparts (1974)
- Sisters (1976)
- Everything Blowing Up: An Adventure of Una Persson, Heroine of Time and Space (1980) (aka Everything Blowing Up: An Adventure of Una Persson, Heroine of Space and Time and Everything Blowing Up)
- How Maxine Learned to Love her Legs: And Other Tales of Growing Up (1995)
