= The Long Loud Silence =

1952 novel by Wilson Tucker

- First edition cover
- Author: Wilson Tucker
- Cover artist: Richard M. Powers
- Language: English
- Genre: Science fiction
- Publisher: Rinehart
- Publication date: 1952
- Publication place: United States
- Media type: Print (Hardcover and Paperback)
- ISBN: 0-89968-375-4

The Long Loud Silence is a science fiction novel by American writer Wilson Tucker. It was first published in hardback edition by Rinehart & Co. in 1952, followed by Dell paperback editions in 1952 and 1954.

At the Hugo Awards in 1953, The Long Loud Silence placed second to The Demolished Man for the inaugural Best Novel award.

The story takes place following a nuclear holocaust which wipes out every major city east of the Mississippi and leaves the survivors permanently infected with plague. To prevent the plague from spreading, the army sets up a cordon sanitaire along the Mississippi. The story follows one survivor, Russell Gary, as he attempts to get back across the river.

== Synopsis ==
Gary, an army corporal, wakes up in a hotel room in Illinois following a drunken binge. He discovers that the town is deserted except for a handful of corpses and comes to the realization that the country has been subjected to an attack. He discovers one other survivor, a girl of 19. They take a car and, after filling it with supplies, drive toward Chicago, which they find to be in flames. They drive west, only to discover that almost all bridges over the Mississippi have been disabled; the one remaining bridge is guarded by army troops on the western side, who shoot anyone attempting to cross over. The girl abandons him; as he travels further, Gary learns that the nuclear attack was combined with bacteriological warfare which infected the entire population with pneumonic plague. Only those rare individuals with natural resistance have survived, but since they are carriers of the disease, the entire eastern third of the country has been quarantined.

Gary is nevertheless determined to cross over. He joins up with a former school teacher, Jay Oliver; they make camp in the hills outside an intact bridge in Kentucky, waiting for the army to allow people across. A woman joins them, trading sex for food. After realizing that the quarantine is permanent, the three decide to go to Florida for the winter where they find a fisherman's cabin on the Gulf coast. After a few months the woman becomes pregnant and expresses her preference for Oliver; Gary decides to leave.

The following winter he finds himself near the Canada–US border. He awakes one night in an abandoned car and sees a young girl running toward him, pursued by men with guns. Gary shoots the men and saves the girl, who tells him that the men have killed her brother. She leads Gary back to the scene of the murder; he discovers that the body has been partially dismembered and concludes that the men were cannibals. He takes the girl to her home, a farmhouse where both mother and father are still alive. Out of gratitude, the father offers to provide lodging if Gary will guard the farm. Gary agrees and spends the winter there.

The following spring he sets off toward Washington DC, hoping to find remnants of the government. While passing through Ohio he chances upon a convoy of army trucks under attack. He joins the attack and saves the convoy. The commanding officer thanks him, but makes it clear that he can not join them; they have come from the west, with orders to deliver gold from Fort Knox, and have not been exposed to the virus. Gary offers to fix a tire, but does so in such a way that it slowly loses air; he catches up with the convoy and through a combination of stealth and boldness, kills most of the men and takes one of the trucks. He drives to the bridge on the Mississippi where the men had been planning to cross over. Masquerading as one of them, he is allowed to cross. From there he escapes into the country side; he is labeled an "enemy agent" and a manhunt is initiated but he evades capture. However, everyone he comes in close contact with succumbs to the plague. He finally realizes that he has no future in the west and returns over the river, to survive for a number of years until he encounters the girl he had met in Illinois.

== Critical reception ==
Damon Knight wrote that The Long Loud Silence is

a phenomenally good book ... The plotting is close-knit without being contrived; the style is compact and eloquent; the characters, in Faulkner's words, "stand up on their hind legs and cast a shadow." ... The book is honest, courageous, deeply felt.

In his "Books" column for F&SF, he selected Tucker's novel as one of the 10 best sf books of the 1950s.

Boucher and McComas praised Tucker's writing for its "strikingly effective simplicity."

Cyril M. Kornbluth also praised the novel, writing that it was "a book of social criticism which might have had the effect of an Uncle Tom's Cabin or Upton Sinclair's The Jungle". He suggested that the novel was overlooked because publishers chose to market it as science fiction rather than as mainstream fiction.

Groff Conklin, although describing the novel as "easily readable," faulted its lack of "imaginative richness" when compared to similar stories.

== Manuscript changes ==
Cyril M. Kornbluth wrote that Tucker's original ending had the protagonist eat his erstwhile mistress, but that Tucker's editor persuaded him to have the two join forces instead. Tucker's original ending was first published, with the author's cooperation, in the Swedish translation of the book that appeared as "Den långa tystnaden" ["The Long Silence"] in 1979.

== See also ==
- Cannibalism in popular culture
