= Fourth Mansions =

1969 novel by R.A. Lafferty

- Cover of first edition (paperback)
- Author: R. A. Lafferty
- Cover artist: Leo and Diane Dillon
- Language: English
- Genre: Science fiction
- Publisher: Ace Books
- Publication date: 1969
- Publication place: United States
- Media type: Print (Paperback & Hardback)
- Pages: 252

Fourth Mansions is a science fiction novel by American author R. A. Lafferty, first published as an Ace Science Fiction Special in 1969. A UK hardcover was issued by Dennis Dobson in 1972, with a Star Books paperback following in 1977. A French translation appeared in 1973. American reprint editions were later issued by Bart Books and by Wildside Press.

Fourth Mansions was nominated for the Nebula Award for Best Novel in 1970, and placed fifth in the Locus Poll for best novel in the same year.

== Plot ==
Fourth Mansions was inspired by Teresa of Ávila's Interior Castle, and contains quotations from the book, which Lafferty uses as chapter headings. The Interior Castle is a metaphor for an individual's soul; its different rooms, different states of the soul. In the middle of the Castle the soul is in the purest state, which equals Heaven. Lafferty uses more complex symbols in telling a many-sided tale of an individual's reaching towards Heaven or Truth. The novel concerns a time of great change, when four forces – in the form of secret societies – contend to control the next phase of humanity's history. In the middle is Fred Foley, an innocent reporter. One of these forces intends to unleash a deadly virus on the US, the others attempt to stop them. A revolution by Mexican migrants, the craft of "mind weaving" and a strange group of "Patricks", all apparently tramps but with great resources, appear in the center of a narrative.

== Reception ==
James Blish recommended Fourth Mansions, calling it "inventive" and "fascinating straight through-and as a dividend, it is often funny", but faulted it for "a whole lot of over-writing" and "speeches that could never come out of a human mouth". He noted that beneath the narrative's superficial chaos lay a "consistent and pervasive" symbolic structure assuring that "the book makes perfect sense". Lester del Rey, however, dismissed the novel, saying "everything is cluttered up. Repeated symbols, allegory, legend, fantasy and assorted other things intrude to the point where there is no consistent tone or attack."

The Wesleyan Anthology of Science Fiction described Fourth Mansions as "a cartoonishly oneiric conflict between cosmic good and evil that draws on the mystic visions of Saint Theresa of Avila".
