= Cory Panshin =

American fiction writer and critic

Cory Panshin (born 1947) is an American science fiction critic and writer. She often writes in collaboration with her husband, Alexei Panshin (1940–2022). The Panshins won the Hugo Award for Best Non-Fiction Book in 1990 for The World Beyond the Hill, a massive history of science fiction. Panshin is currently writing a "theory of human history as controlled by an evolving sequence of visions of the underlying nature of reality" which she is publishing in installments on her personal blog.
