= Aurelia (novel) =

1982 novel by R. A. Lafferty

Aurelia is a novel by R. A. Lafferty published in 1982.

== Plot summary ==
Aurelia is a novel in which Aurelia is a 14-year old who goes to another world.

== Reception ==
Dave Langford reviewed Aurelia for White Dwarf #41, and stated that "this is Lafferty, pushing 70 but still a bizarre and original author who's an acquired taste, and the book bulges with jokes and philosophy (hard to spot which is which), tall tales and weird people; horned men, sinister yo-yos, doppelgangers, the extra prime number between 5 and 7, and a worm with a gun. Indescribable. I loved it."

== Reviews ==
- Review by Faren Miller (1982) in Locus, #262 November 1982
- Review by David Nixon (1983) in Fantasy Newsletter, #55 January 1983
- Review by Dave Langford (1983) in Foundation, #28 July 1983
- Review by Tom Easton (1983) in Analog Science Fiction/Science Fact, September 1983
