= Rick Raphael =

Rick Raphael (February 20, 1919 – January 4, 1994) was an American journalist and science fiction author.

He published his first short story, "A Filbert Is a Nut", in the November 1959 issue of Astounding.

In 1964, his short story "Code Three" was nominated for a Hugo Award for Best Short Story, as well as "Once a Cop" in 1965. These two stories were expanded into his best known work, the fix-up novel Code Three, which was published in 1966.

In the early 1980s, he published two more novels. Raphael died in 1994.

In 2020, his legacy was honored with the Cordwainer Smith Rediscovery Award.

== Bibliography ==
=== Novels ===
- Code Three (Simon & Schuster / Gollancz, 1966)
- The Defector (Doubleday, 1980)
- The President Must Die (W. W. Norton, 1981)

=== Novellas and short story collections ===
- "Code Three" (in Analog, February 1963)
- "Once a Cop" (in Analog, May 1964)
- The Thirst Quenchers (Gollancz, 1965). Includes: "The Mailman Cometh", "Guttersnipe", "The Thirst Quenchers", and "Odd Man In".
- The Thirst Quenchers and Three Other Science Fiction Tales (2010). Includes: "Make Mine Homogenized", "The Thirst Quenchers", "A Filbert Is a Nut", and "Sonny".

=== Individual stories ===
- A Filbert Is a Nut (1959)
- Make Mine Homogenized (1960)
- Sonny (1963)
- The Thirst Quenchers (1963)
- Identity Mistaken (1964)
- Guttersnipe (1964)
- Odd Man In (1965)
- The Mailman Cometh (1965)
- False Scent (1981)
- Pelangus (1981)
