= The Unsleeping Eye (novel) =

1974 novel by D. G. Compton

First edition (publ. DAW Books) Cover art by Karel Thole

The Unsleeping Eye is a 1974 science fiction novel by British writer D. G. Compton. It was first published in the United Kingdom as The Continuous Katherine Mortenhoe in 1974. It was adapted into the 1980 Bertrand Tavernier film Death Watch, starring Harvey Keitel, Romy Schneider and Max von Sydow.

== Premise ==
The story is set in the near future, in a welfare state. A journalist is operated on so that what he sees is transmitted to a TV studio. He pursues a woman who is dying of an incurable disease, and provides viewers with voyeuristic images of her private anguish.

== Reception ==
Theodore Sturgeon praised The Unsleeping Eye as a novel that "fulfills all of its extraordinary promise." In 2016, Jeff VanderMeer wrote, "In an age in which privacy isn’t just vanishing but willfully renounced, The Continuous Katherine Mortenhoe seems not only relevant but proactively current."

== Reissue ==
The book was republished under the original title of The Continuous Katherine Mortenhoe by New York Review Books in 2016 (ISBN 978-1-59017-971-0) with an introduction by Jeff VanderMeer.

== See also ==
- List of science fiction novels
