= Wyman Guin =

American novelist

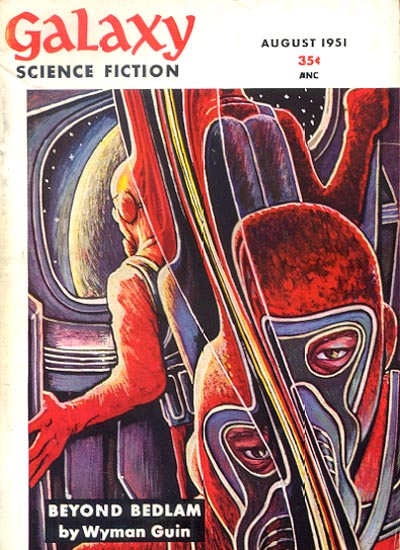
"Beyond Bedlam" was the cover story in the August 1951 issue of Galaxy Science Fiction, illustrated by Ed Emshwiller.

Wyman Woods Guin (March 1, 1915 – February 19, 1989) was an American pharmacologist and advertising executive best known for writing science fiction.

Born in Wanette, Oklahoma, he published his first story "Trigger Tide" in 1950 under the pseudonym Norman Menasco. Guin gained attention the following year with his novella "Beyond Bedlam" in Galaxy Science Fiction, for which he is best remembered. He published one novel, The Standing Joy, in 1969.

In 2013, Guin was posthumously awarded the Cordwainer Smith Rediscovery Award at Readercon 24.

== Bibliography ==
- Living Way Out (Avon, 1967). Short story collection republished in the UK as Beyond Bedlam (Sphere, 1973) with a previously unpublished story, “The Evidence for Whooping Cranes”. Original collection includes:
  - "A Man of the Renaissance". Galaxy, December 1964.
  - "My Darling Hecate". Beyond Fantasy Fiction, November 1953.
  - "The Delegate from Guapanga". Galaxy, August 1964.
  - "The Root and the Ring". Beyond Fantasy Fiction, September 1954.
  - "Trigger Tide". Astounding, October 1950.
  - "Volpla". Galaxy, May 1956.
  - "Beyond Bedlam". Galaxy, August 1951.
- The Standing Joy (Avon, 1969), a novel.

== Sources ==
- Contemporary Authors Vol. 171 p. 149.
- The Encyclopedia of Science Fiction pp. 528–529.
