= Serpent's Egg (novel) =

1987 novel by R. A. Lafferty

Serpent's Egg is a novel by R. A. Lafferty published in 1987.

== Plot summary ==
A gathering of young, intelligent beings, some humanoid, some not, is threatened by violence and murder.

== Reception ==
Dave Langford reviewed Serpent's Egg for White Dwarf #96, and stated that "As so often before, Lafferty moves from determined whimsy to a bloody, religiously informed and inconclusive finale; almost any paragraph is a delight to read, but in contrast to his earlier works they don't add up convincingly."

== Reviews ==
- Review by Paul Brazier (1988) in Vector 143
- Review by Tom Easton (1988) in Analog Science Fiction/Science Fact, July 1988
- Review by Ken Brown (1988) in Interzone, #23 Spring 1988
