= Them Bones (novel) =

1984 novel by Howard Waldrop

- U.S. first printing paperback
- Author: Howard Waldrop
- Cover artist: Marvin Mattleson
- Language: English
- Genre: Science fiction
- Publisher: Ace Books
- Publication date: 1984
- Publication place: United States
- Media type: Print (Mass Market Paperback)
- Pages: 224
- ISBN: 0-441-80557-4

Them Bones (1984) is the first solo novel by science fiction writer Howard Waldrop, noted for his short fiction. It was nominated for the Philip K. Dick Award in 1984, but lost out to William Gibson's Neuromancer; both novels were part of the third Ace Science Fiction Specials series edited by Terry Carr.

== Plot summary ==
The plot is built around three separate but interconnected stories woven through the novel. The first is set in 1929, where archaeologists in Louisiana excavating a mound of the Coles Creek culture encounter the skeleton of a horse, a seeming impossibility as the mound predates the re-introduction of the horse to North America. The mystery deepens when one of the archaeologists discovers something in the mound even more anachronistic: a corroded brass rifle cartridge.

The second is the first-person narrative of Madison Yazoo Leake, a soldier in the United States Army and a member of the "Special Group" being sent back in time to 1930s Louisiana in an attempt to stop the destruction of the human race in a nuclear war. However, while Leake arrives at the target site, it is in a world where Arabs explored America, the Roman Empire never existed, and the Aztec empire extended to the Mississippi. The only member of his team to arrive at this destination, he soon establishes contact with a group of mound-builders who gradually befriend him.

The final narrative is based on the diary entries of Warrant Officer Smith, another member of the Special Group. She arrives with the rest of the team of military and CIA personnel in what apparently is their timeline, only hundreds of years earlier than intended. Through her diary entries and the count of those members present for duty the story of their interactions with the local natives in their pre-Columbian world.
