= Rite of Passage (novel) =

1968 novel by Alexei Panshin

- Cover of first edition
- Author: Alexei Panshin
- Cover artist: Leo and Diane Dillon
- Language: English
- Genre: Science fiction
- Publisher: Ace Books
- Publication date: 1968
- Publication place: United States
- Media type: Print (hardback & paperback)
- Pages: 254
- ISBN: 0-671-44068-3
- OCLC: 9226788

Rite of Passage is a science fiction novel by American writer Alexei Panshin. Published in 1968 as an Ace Science Fiction Special, this novel about a shipboard teenager's coming of age won that year's Nebula Award, and was nominated for the Hugo Award for Best Novel in 1969.

== Plot summary ==
Rite of Passage is told as a flashback by Mia Havero, the daughter of the Chairman of the Ship's Council, after she has completed her own rite of passage, also known as Trial. She has survived for thirty days on a colony planet with minimal supplies as part of her initiation into adulthood on one of several giant Ships that survived Earth's destruction in AD 2041. To prevent overpopulation on the Ships, family units can only produce children with the approval of the Ship's Eugenics Council. The penalty for breaking this rule is exile to a colony world.

By the year 2198, Mia Havero is twelve years old and, like most of Ship-bound humanity, regards the colonists as "Mudeaters", a derogatory reference to frontier life on a planet. When she accompanies her father on a trading mission to the planet Grainau, Mia learns from the children of a Grainau official that the feeling is mutual; many on the colony worlds call Ship people "Grabbies" because they take whatever goods they cannot produce on the Ships in return for knowledge and technology (doled out sparingly), the heritage of Earth to which the ship residents have laid claim and which colonists are unable to maintain, being too busy staying alive.

When Mia returns to the Ship, in addition to her regular studies, she joins a survival class. Survival class is every thirteen-year-old's preparation for Trial, the Ships' rite of passage into adulthood required within three months of turning fourteen. By requiring adolescents to experience the rigors and dangers of life on a colony planet, the Ships hope to avoid stagnation and ensure that those who survive are skilled enough to contribute significantly to Ship life. However, the mortality rate of Trial participants is fairly high, so no expense is spared to train the adolescents about to go through Trial so that they will survive the month spent planetside.

Mia's companion in school and in survival class is Jimmy Dentremont, a highly gifted boy of her own age. Their initial rivalry turns to friendship and eventually blossoms into love. Both in and out of survival class, sometimes with Jimmy and sometimes with other children, Mia has a series of adventures that build her confidence, broaden her world, and prepare her for Trial. Her moral awareness also grows during this time, both through formal study of ethical theory and through reflection on the errors she inevitably makes as she risks new experiences.

Shortly after her fourteenth birthday, Mia and her class are dispatched to the planet Tintera to undergo their Trial. Having quarreled with Jimmy, Mia refuses to team with him, but still chooses the tiger strategy over the turtle strategy; that is, she chooses to act on this world rather than hide out for the month that she's on planet. Mia soon encounters a party of rough men on horseback, who are herding Losels, native humanoids the Tinterans treat as domestic animals and use for simple labor, although they may be intelligent enough to be considered slaves. Mia escapes the Losel herders' attempted kidnapping, and when she reaches the nearest town, she is repulsed by the fact that all Tinterans are "Free Birthers"—they have no population control. She is also disturbed by their apparent practice of enslaving Losels.

After a second run-in with the Losel herders leaves Mia badly beaten and robbed of the signalling device she will need to return to her Ship, she is rescued by Daniel Kutsov, an old man who has been reduced to a simple, manual job as a result of past political activity. Kutsov treats Mia like an adopted grandchild and explains to Mia that her speech gives her away as being from the Ships. Kutsov tells Mia that Ship people are at best regarded with resentment, and at worst killed. Mia has already learned that the Tinterans have captured a scoutship from another Ship and arrested one of her fellow Trial participants. While recovering from her injuries in Kutsov's house, she discovers that the prisoner is Jimmy Dentremont. Singlehanded, Mia stages a jailbreak and escapes to the wilderness with Jimmy, but not before the two witness the brutal killing of Kutsov in a roundup of political dissidents.

Riding through the night in the pouring rain, Mia and Jimmy set up a tent in the woods. While in the tent, they realize their feelings for each other and have sex. They arrive the following day at the military headquarters for the territory, where Jimmy retrieves his own signalling device. Before they leave the base, they also disable the captured scoutship.

Soon after Mia and Jimmy return from Trial, a Shipwide Assembly debates what to do about Tintera. The Tinterans are Free Birthers, possibly slavers, and a potential danger to the Ship itself. As Mia hears the Assembly's debate, however, she understands that her views have changed. Her moral world has broadened to include the Tinterans as people, rather than faceless spear carriers to be used and discarded. Thus she cannot bring herself to condemn the Tinterans en masse. However, under the leadership of Mia's father, who perceives the Tinterans as beyond re-education, the Assembly votes by an eight-to-five margin to destroy Tintera in the name of 'moral discipline'. Mia and Jimmy, as adults, prepare to settle into their own living quarters on board Ship. Jimmy offers the hope that they will someday be in a position to change their society.

== Reception ==
Algis Budrys praised Rite of Passage as an "intensely believable, movingly personalized story", saying that "each of the little, perfectly realized steps" in the story "is so perfectly done that one feels a real shock as one realizes that Panshin after all has never been a girl growing up aboard a hollowed-out planetoid". James Blish also received the novel favorably, saying "[T]his is not just another starship book, but a fully realized, lived-in world. I found the novel a little long and slow-moving for my taste, but I was charmed by its heroine. ... [E]ven the slow slow sections were a pleasure to read".

Aldiss and Wingrove, however, declared that the novel "lacks the spark of life which might have fired its interesting subject matter ... For all its craft and its attempt to create an intelligent updating of a Heinlein juvenile, it proves tiresome rather than inspired."

== Themes ==
The theme of generational conflict was timely in the novel's year of publication, 1968. Long-lived adults form the overwhelming majority of the population aboard Mia's ship. Although they are generally benevolent and trustworthy, the society they have created appears complacent and aimless. Just as Mia must escape from the self-imposed limits of her shipboard “quad” if she is to survive Trial and achieve adulthood, it seems that the society of the Ship will have to escape its comfortable routine of drifting from planet to planet if it is ever to make use of the heritage it preserves.

The coming of age theme is dramatized through the events of Mia's Trial, a rite of passage that ensures her adulthood will be earned and meaningful. The theme is artfully elaborated in three folktales that appear in the narrative: “Bright Sam and Charming Ned,” told by a young scoutship pilot; “The Lady of Carlisle,” told by Mia herself; and a third tale (reduced at the editor's behest to a brief summary) told by Daniel Kutsov. All three feature young people who face tests of courage or resourcefulness.

The ethical discussions in the novel are at an elementary level, as is appropriate for a teenage narrator. Mia's final moral stance is broadly Kantian (Kant is the only philosopher she mentions by name) in that it demands respect for the personhood of others and forbids treating others as mere means. Mia's moral maturity comes with her recognition that “the universe is filled with people, and there is not a single solitary spear carrier among them.”

Many classic science fiction novels end with the destruction of an entire planet and its inhabitants. Typically, as in the Skylark and Lensman novels of E. E. “Doc” Smith, such destruction is presented as a starkly necessary defense against alien beings who are incorrigibly dangerous or evil. Rite of Passage departs from this tradition by condemning the destruction of Tintera as an act that no one, in principle, could ever have the right to commit.

In the Ship's Assembly, the proposal to destroy Tintera is debated in the context of an ongoing political controversy over what, if anything, the Ships owe to the planetary colonists. Mia's father takes the position that the colonists will do best if they learn to fend for themselves and not expect aid from the Ships. Mia and Jimmy's mentor, Joseph Mbele, believes that the Ships have an obligation to assist the colonists by sharing their knowledge, which Daniel Kutsov says is the heritage of all who survived the destruction of Earth. Both sides of the debate receive a respectful hearing at various places in the novel, and neither is presented as indisputably correct, but by the end of her story Mia has clearly come around to the view that the Ships have an obligation to the colonies.

Many of these themes appear in three other Panshin stories set in the same fictional future: “The Sons of Prometheus” (Analog, 1966), “A Sense of Direction” (Amazing, 1969), and “Arpad” (Quark 2, 1971). In “Arpad” there is a brief cameo appearance by Mia and Jimmy. All three stories are collected in Panshin's Farewell to Yesterday’s Tomorrow (Berkley, 1975).
