= The Black Corridor =

1969 novel by Michael Moorcock

- Cover of the first edition
- Author: Michael Moorcock
- Cover artist: Leo and Diane Dillon
- Language: English
- Genre: Science fiction
- Publisher: Ace Books
- Publication date: 1969
- Publication place: United States
- Media type: Print (paperback)
- Pages: 187

The Black Corridor is a science fiction novel by Michael Moorcock. It was published in 1969, first by Ace Books in the US, as part of their Ace Science Fiction Specials series, and later by Mayflower Books in the UK.

It is essentially a novel about the decay of society and the deep personal and social isolation this has caused, and tells of a man fleeing through interstellar space from Earth, where civilisation is collapsing into anarchy and wars. The author uses techniques ranging from straight narrative to entries in the spaceship's log, dream sequences and 1960s-style computer printouts.

== Plot summary ==
Ryan is a tough-minded British businessman appalled by the breakdown of society at the end of the 20th century. He feels that he is one of the few sane men in a world of paranoiacs.

With a small group of family and friends, he has stolen a spaceship and set out for Munich 15040 (Barnard's Star), a planet believed to be suitable for colonisation. Now he keeps watch alone, with his 13 companions sealed in cabinets designed to keep them in suspended animation for the many years of the journey. He makes a daily report on each one: it is always "Condition Steady".

Ryan is tormented by nightmares and memories of the violence on Earth; he starts to fear he is losing his grip on reality. The shipboard computer urges him to take a drug that eliminates all delusions and hallucinations; but he is strangely reluctant to use this drug.

== Authorship ==
Although the novel is credited to Michael Moorcock, it includes many scenes based on a rough draft dystopian novel started but not finished by Moorcock's then-wife, Hilary Bailey, "a straight future disaster story – collapse of society stuff". Moorcock took Bailey's scenes set on Earth and heavily rewrote them, adding all the scenes that occur on the Hope Dempsey.

All the scenes in the ship are mine. Many of the scenes back on Earth are Hilary's. That's why it was never presented as a regular collaboration. She didn't want it done that way. So I worked in acknowledgements in the dedication.

— Michael Moorcock

== Typographical art ==
The novel contains sequences of typographical art, where, in the words of the author, "words create a pattern of other letters forming other words". In various editions of the book, these sequences have not always been presented correctly. The first American edition (Ace, 1969) got the art right, although the book's opening passages were cut. The first UK edition (Mayflower, 1969) restored the opening passages but the typesetters messed up the typographical art, although they did get the art on their correct pages, something that subsequent American printings failed to do.

When John Davey edited the Tales of the Eternal Champion omnibuses for Orion (in the UK) and White Wolf (in the US) in the 1990s, every effort was made to ensure that the typographical art was perfect in the volume containing The Black Corridor (Sailing to Utopia). These omnibuses (particularly the White Wolf edition) are regarded by Moorcock as being the "most accurate typographically".

== Critical response ==
Barry N. Malzberg reviewed the novel unfavorably on its release, saying that "it is not good. It is really not at all good", but concluding: "I remain convinced that someday Moorcock will write a substantial novel, fully worthy of his pretensions and our expectations."

The Black Corridor was cited by Karl Edward Wagner as one of the thirteen best science-fiction horror novels. The author China Miéville has described the book as "an underrated and chilling piece of political pulp modernism".
