= The Year of the Quiet Sun =

1970 novel by Wilson Tucker

- Cover of first edition (paperback)
- Author: Wilson Tucker
- Cover artist: Leo and Diane Dillon
- Language: English
- Genre: Science fiction
- Publisher: Ace Books
- Publication date: 1970
- Publication place: United States
- Media type: Print (hardback & paperback)
- Pages: 252
- ISBN: 0-441-94201-6

The Year of the Quiet Sun is a 1970 science fiction novel by American writer Wilson Tucker, dealing with the use of forward time travel to ascertain future political and social events. It won a retrospective John W. Campbell Memorial Award in 1976. It was also nominated for a Nebula Award for Best Novel in 1970, and a Hugo Award for Best Novel in 1971.

== Plot summary ==
In the summer of 1978, Brian Chaney, a demographer and biblical scholar, is approached by a woman named Kathryn van Hise. Initially assuming her to be a reporter interested in a controversial book he just published on the Dead Sea Scrolls, she informs him that she works for the federal Bureau of Standards and that she is recruiting him for a physical survey of the future via a secretly constructed "TDV" or time displacement vehicle. When Chaney demurs, she informs him that his contract has been purchased from the think tank where he works, leaving him little choice.

The reluctant Chaney travels to a military installation south of Joliet, Illinois. There he is teamed with two diversely talented military officers, United States Air Force Major William Moresby and United States Navy Lieutenant Commander Arthur Saltus. Chaney soon finds that he shares with Saltus an attraction to Kathryn, who is their civilian liaison, but unlike Saltus, Chaney lacks the assertiveness to pursue her aggressively. Instead he focuses his attention on the project, which is soon ordered by the President of the United States to embark on their first mission, a trip two years into the future to discover whether he wins the 1980 presidential election.

The three travel to the Thursday after the election on individual trips, with first Moresby and then Saltus going first according to military seniority. Chaney, as a civilian, is the last to leave, but arrives earlier than the others due to a temporal navigation instrument error. They discover that the president, whom Chaney despises as a weak man (in fact, his name is given as "President Meeks"), wins the election in a landslide as a result of his successful handling of ongoing race riots in Chicago, and that these riots have resulted in the building of a wall down the middle of Cermak Road dividing the north of the city from the south. They also learn that the nation is under martial law after a failed attempt by the Joint Chiefs of Staff to take over the government by coup d'état, one thwarted because of the advance knowledge the time travelers will bring back of it. While preparing for their return, Saltus informs Chaney of an additional discovery: a marriage license between him and Kathryn. Chaney concedes to the gloating Saltus.

With the success of the initial mission, the three are authorized to travel further into the future. They plan to travel to dates of their own choosing within the coming two decades, with each trip to be separated by approximately a year in order to provide broader coverage.

Moresby goes first and travels to July 4, 1999 ("It has significance, after all!" he says), only to emerge in the middle of a racial civil war in which Chicago had recently been attacked with a nuclear bomb launched from China on behalf of black guerrillas. Quickly getting involved in a battle between base troops and invading "ramjets", as the black guerrillas are called, Moresby dies in an attack on a ramjet mortar position.

Saltus is the next to go, traveling to the date of his 50th birthday in 2000. Upon arrival, he discovers remnants of the battle, and is nearly killed by survivors hiding out on the base. Wounded, he is assisted back to the displacement vehicle by an unknown figure and returns to the present, taking with him a tape-recorded report that Moresby had made upon his arrival.

Forewarned by Saltus's experience, Chaney travels further into the future. Not having chosen a date, and disillusioned by his experiences on the 1980 trip, he arrives at an indeterminate point in "2000-plus", by which time the power from the base's nuclear reactor has been disrupted, causing the chronometers set up for the travelers to shut down. Venturing outside, he finds the base to be long-neglected, apart from a cistern and a grave. While further investigating the grave (that of Saltus), he is approached by a man and a woman who identify themselves as Arthur and Kathryn's children. They take Chaney to Kathryn, now elderly, who reveals that civilization collapsed as an indirect result of the time travel project; with the information from the future, the president made a series of disastrous decisions that led to war with China, followed by the civil war and societal destruction. When Chaney asks how much of this information he reports, she informs him that he reported none of it, that with the loss of power the time displacement vehicle can no longer return to the past and that Chaney is trapped in the future.

Although it is foreshadowed earlier in the book, only at this point is the reader explicitly told a fact that makes Chaney's predicament all the more tragic. He is black, the only such member of the project. "Everyone fears you; no one will trust you since the rebellion," Kathryn tells him. "I am the only one here who does not fear a black man."

== Reception ==
In her introduction to the 1979 Gregg Press edition of the novel, writer Sandra Miesel praised the novel as "an intimate drama of Armageddon played out within the boundaries of Will County, Illinois by a cast of five principals." She noted the way Wilson linked the America of the novel and the Qumran community of ancient Palestine, which are introduced through Chaney's background as a biblical scholar who had published a book on the Dead Sea Scrolls prior to the start of the novel. The parallels were made explicit through Biblical motifs that appear throughout the novel, with characters paralleling types out of the Dead Sea Scrolls and such apocalyptic imagery as a radioactive Lake Michigan substituting for the lake of fire in the Book of Revelation.
