= The Lincoln Hunters =

1958 novel by Wilson Tucker

- First edition
- Author: Wilson Tucker
- Language: English
- Genre: Science fiction
- Publisher: Rinehart & Company
- Publication date: 1958
- Publication place: United States
- Media type: Print (hardback & paperback)
- Pages: 192
- OCLC: 25188710

The Lincoln Hunters is a 1958 science fiction novel by American writer Wilson Tucker.

== Plot ==
The novel, set in the year 2578, details the story of a historian from the oppressive society of that year, who travels back in time to record Abraham Lincoln's Lost Speech of May 19, 1856, in Bloomington, Illinois.

It contains a vivid description of Lincoln in the early stages of his career, seen through the eyes of a future American who feels that Lincoln and his time compare very favorably with the traveler's own.

== Legacy ==
The book is mentioned in 11/22/63, a 2011 novel by Stephen King that also centers around time travel and an assassinated president. Furthermore, King's protagonist time travels to 1958—the year "Hunters" was published—to alter the timeline by 1963.
