= Wilson Tucker (writer) =

American writer (1914–2006)

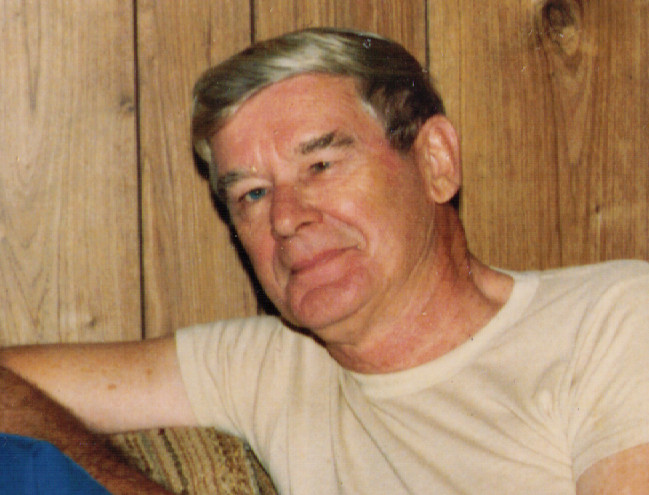
- Born: Arthur Wilson Tucker; November 23, 1914; Deer Creek, Illinois, U.S.
- Died: October 6, 2006 (aged 91); St. Petersburg, Florida, U.S.
- Occupation: Writer
- Writing career
- Pen name: Bob Tucker, Hoy Ping Pong
- Period: 1932–2006 (as fan)
- Genres: Science fiction, mystery
- Notable works: The Year of the Quiet Sun; The Lincoln Hunters

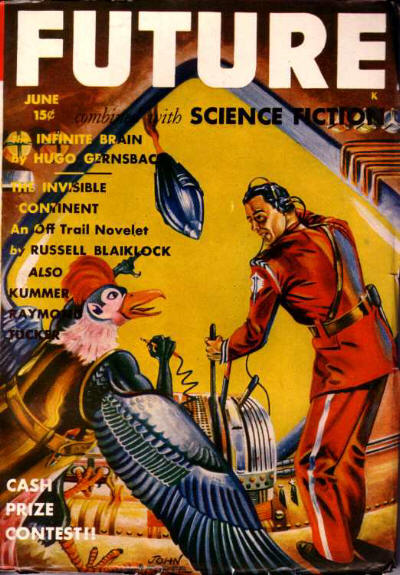
Tucker's "The Princess of Detroit" was the cover story for the June 1942 issue of Future.

Arthur Wilson "Bob" Tucker (November 23, 1914 – October 6, 2006) was an American author who became well known as a writer of mystery, action adventure, and science fiction under the name Wilson Tucker.

Tucker was also a prominent member of science fiction fandom, who wrote extensively for fanzines under the name Bob Tucker, a family nickname bestowed in childhood (his own mispronunciation of the nickname "Bub"). He became a prominent analyst and critic of the field, as well as the coiner of such terms as "space opera".

== Life ==
Born in Deer Creek, Illinois, for most of his life Tucker made his home in Bloomington, Illinois. He was married twice. In 1937, he wed Mary Joesting; they had a son and a daughter before the marriage dissolved in 1942. His second marriage, to Fern Delores Brooks in 1953, lasted 52 years, until her death in 2006; they had three sons.

== Fandom ==
Tucker became involved in science fiction fandom in 1932, publishing a fanzine, The Planetoid. From 1938 to 2001, he published the fanzine Le Zombie, which lasted for more than 60 issues and was later revived as a webzine. (The title arising from the fact that on multiple occasions fallacious reports of his death were made within fandom.)

He also published the Bloomington News Letter, which dealt with news within the professional science fiction writing field. Active in letter-writing as well, Tucker was a popular fan during more than six decades, coining many words and phrases familiar in science fiction fandom and to literary criticism of the field. In addition to "Bob Tucker", he was also known to write under the pseudonym "Hoy Ping Pong" (generally reserved for humorous pieces.) During a 41-year period, 1955 to 1996, Tucker created and edited eight separate editions of The Neo-Fan's Guide To Science Fiction Fandom, an historical overview of the first five decades of science fiction fandom, with important events and trends in fandom noted. Each edition also carried a lexicon of fan terminology in use throughout fandom at the time. The eighth and final edition remains in print from the Kansas City Science Fiction and Fantasy Society.

Tucker's fanzine writing has been described as "unfailingly incisive", and Tucker as "the most intelligent and articulate and sophisticated fan the American science-fiction community is ever likely to boast of". He helped pioneer criticism of the genre, coining along the way terms like "space opera" in common use today.

He was fan guest of honor, professional guest of honor, toastmaster, or master of ceremonies at so many science fiction conventions over nearly seven decades that no one has managed to compile a comprehensive list. Notable are his appearances as guest of honor at Torcon I (the 1948 Worldcon) and NyCon3 (the 1967 Worldcon), a perennial stint as toastmaster of the long-running Midwestcon and LibertyCon, and as toastmaster at MidAmeriCon, the 1976 Worldcon.

In 1940, he served on the committee of the Worldcon in Chicago. In 2001, he co-hosted the joint Ditto/FanHistoriCon held in his hometown of Bloomington, Illinois.

Tucker won the Hugo Award for Best Fan Writer in 1970 and the 1954 Retro-Hugo for the same category in 2004. His Science Fiction Newsletter (a.k.a. Bloomington News Letter) won the Retro-Hugo Award for Best Fanzine for 1951. His fanzine Le Zombie also won the 1943 Retro Hugo for Best Fanzine at Worldcon 76 in San Jose, CA.

The Science Fiction and Fantasy Hall of Fame inducted Tucker in 2003, its eighth class of two deceased and two living writers. Other honors included the 1986 Skylark (annual Edward E. Smith Memorial Award for Imaginative Fiction), the 1996 Author Emeritus of the Science Fiction Writers of America, and the First Fandom Hall of Fame Award.

Tuckercon, the 2007 NASFiC (North American Science Fiction Convention) in Collinsville, Illinois, was dedicated to Tucker.

== Career ==
Although he sold more than 20 novels, Tucker made his principal living as a movie projectionist and theater electrician, starting as a prop man at the Majestic Theater in Bloomington, Illinois. He served as President of Local 193 of the International Alliance of Theatrical Stage Employees (IATSE), and retired as a projectionist in 1972.

=== Professional writing ===
In 1941, Tucker's first professional short story, "Interstellar Way Station", was published by Frederik Pohl in the May issue of Super Science Stories. Between 1941 and 1979, primarily in the early 1940s and early 1950s, he produced about two dozen more. He also turned his attention to writing novels, with 11 mystery novels and a dozen science fiction novels to his credit.

His most famous novel may be The Year of the Quiet Sun (1970). It was runner-up for the Locus Award for Best Novel and a finalist for the Hugo and the Nebula Award. In 1976 it won a special retrospective John W. Campbell Memorial Award (established 1973 for 1972 novels).

Other notable novels include The Lincoln Hunters (1958), in which time-travelers from an oppressive future society seek to record Abraham Lincoln's "lost speech" of May 19, 1856. It contains a vivid description of Lincoln and his time, seen through the eyes of a future American who feels that Lincoln and his time compare very favorably with the traveler's own.

The Long Loud Silence (1952) is a post-apocalypse story in which the eastern third of the United States is quarantined as the result of an atomic and bacteriological attack. Damon Knight called it "a phenomenally good book; in its own terms, it comes as near perfection as makes no difference."

Much of Tucker's short fiction was collected in The Best of Wilson Tucker (Timescape, 1982; ISBN 0-671-83243-3).

Tucker's habit of using the names of friends for minor characters in his fiction led to the literary term "tuckerization" or "tuckerism(s)". For example, Tucker named a character after Lee Hoffman in his novel The Long Loud Silence, after Robert Bloch in The Lincoln Hunters, and after Walt Willis in Wild Talent.

== Selected works ==
=== Charles Horne mysteries ===
- The Chinese Doll (1946)
- To Keep or Kill (1947)
- The Dove (1948)
- The Stalking Man (1949)
- Red Herring (1951)

=== Time Masters series ===
- The Time Masters (1953, revised 1971)
- Time Bomb (1955) (aka Tomorrow Plus X)

=== Other novels ===
- The City in the Sea (1951)
- The Long Loud Silence (1952)
- Wild Talent (1954) (aka Man from Tomorrow, 1955 )
- Time: X (1955)
- The Lincoln Hunters (1958)
- To the Tombaugh Station (1960)
- A Procession of the Damned (1965)
- The Year of the Quiet Sun (1970)
- This Witch (1971)
- Ice and Iron (1974) (aka Ice & Iron, 1975)
- Resurrection Days (1981)

=== Collections ===
- The Science-Fiction Subtreasury (Rinehart, 1954) (collection)
- The Best of Wilson Tucker (Timescape, 1982) (collection)

=== Stories ===
- "The Princess of Detroit", Future Science Fiction (June 1942)
- "The Planet King" (1959)

=== Nonfiction ===
- The Neo-Fan's Guide To Science Fiction Fandom (eight editions, 1955 to 1996)

== See also ==
- Tuckerization
