= R. A. Lafferty =

American writer (1914–2002)

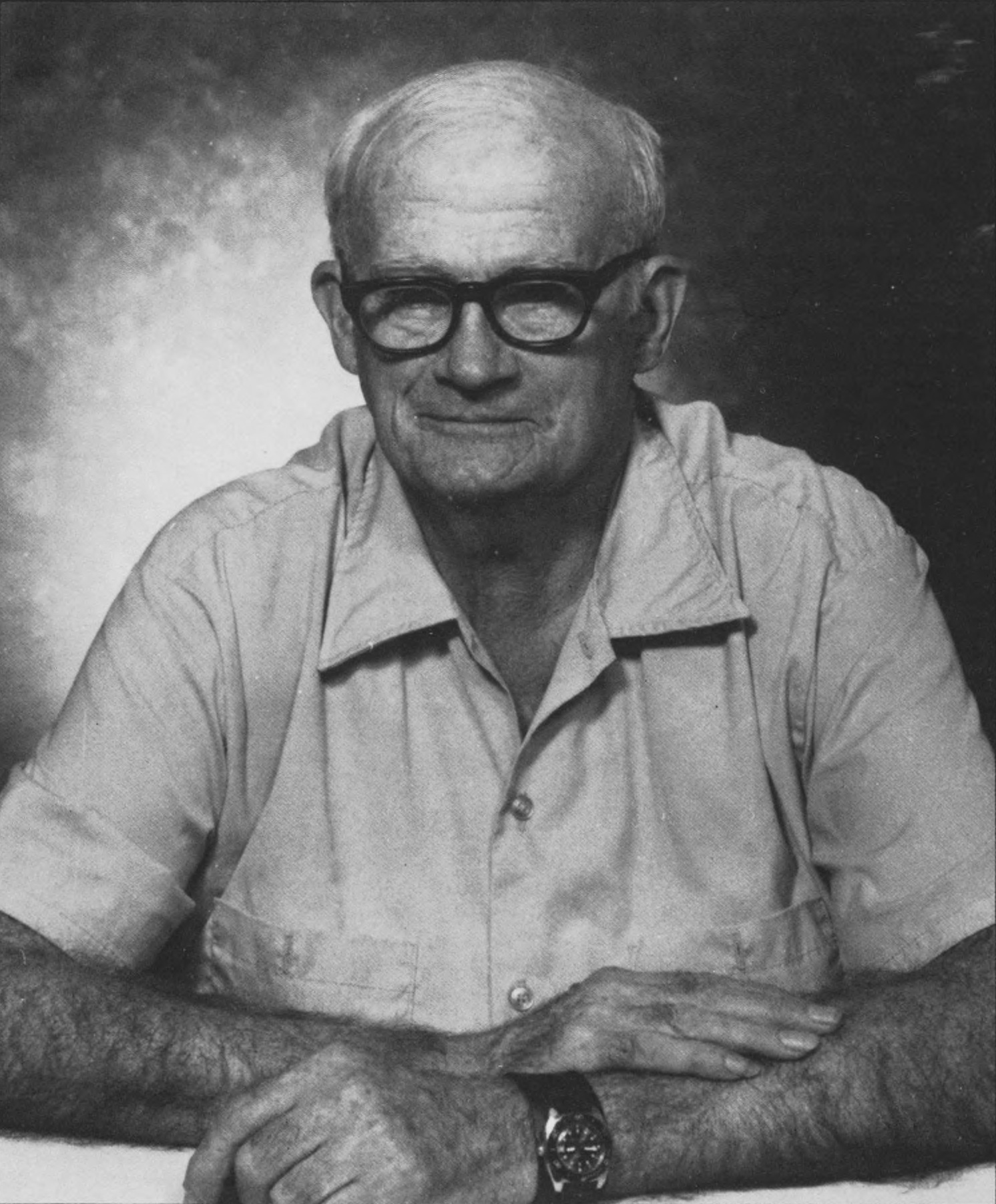
- Lafferty in 1984
- Born: Raphael Aloysius Lafferty; November 7, 1914; Neola, Iowa, U.S.
- Died: March 18, 2002 (aged 87); Broken Arrow, Oklahoma, U.S.
- Occupations: Novelist, short story author
- Writing career
- Genres: Science fiction, Fantasy
- Notable works: Past Master, Fourth Mansions, Nine Hundred Grandmothers, The Devil Is Dead, Okla Hannali

Raphael Aloysius Lafferty (November 7, 1914 – March 18, 2002) was an American science fiction, fantasy and historical fiction writer best known for his imaginative and eccentric short stories and novels from the 1960s and 1970s.

== Life and work ==
Lafferty was born on November 7, 1914, in Neola, Iowa to devoutly Catholic parents, Hugh David Lafferty, a broker dealing in oil leases and royalties, and Julia Mary (née Burke), a teacher. Both were first-generation Irish Americans. He was born the youngest of five siblings. One of the origins Lafferty has offered for his first name, Raphael, is that it was derived from the day on which he was expected to be born (October 24, the Feast of St. Raphael); he also speculates that he might have been named after the artist, or that he was named after St Raphael's Cathedral. When he was four, his family moved to Perry, Oklahoma.

He graduated from Cascia Hall, and came of age in the early years of the Great Depression. He studied in the night school division at the University of Tulsa in 1932–33, mostly studying mathematics and German, but left before graduating. In 1935, he began to work for Clark Electrical Supply Company in Tulsa and, from 1939 to 1942, attended the International Correspondence School, becoming what he described as a "correspondence school engineer". One of his hobbies was studying languages. Per The New York Times, "He taught himself Greek in order to read the New Testament in the original."

He enlisted in the U.S. Army in 1942. After training in Texas, North Carolina, Florida, and California, he was sent to the South Pacific Area, serving in Australia, New Guinea, Morotai and the Philippines. When he left the Army in 1946, he had become a 1st Sergeant serving as a staff sergeant and had received an Asiatic–Pacific Campaign Medal. He returned to his sales position at Clark and turned to writing in the late 1950s. He never married and lived most of his life in Tulsa with his sister, Anna Lafferty.

Although Lafferty did not begin writing until his mid-40s, he wrote dozens of novels and more than two hundred short stories, most of them at least nominally science fiction. As he explained in a 1968 publication, "I was a heavy drinker... I cut down on it, beginning my writing attempts at about the same time to fill a certain void." His first published story was "The Wagons" in the New Mexico Quarterly Review in 1959. His first published science fiction story was "Day of the Glacier", in The Original Science Fiction Stories in 1960, and his debut novel was Past Master in 1968. In the same year, he also published The Reefs of Earth and Space Chantey, a science fiction retelling of Homer's Odyssey, which was then followed by Fourth Mansions (1969), a work inspired by Teresa of Ávila.

Around 1980, his output declined due to a stroke. He stopped writing regularly in 1984. In 1994, he suffered another, more severe, stroke.

Lafferty's work was represented by Virginia Kidd Literary Agency, which held a cache of his unpublished manuscripts. This included over a dozen novels, such as Iron Tongue of Midnight, as well as about eighty short stories and a handful of essays.

== Death and legacy ==
He died on March 18, 2002, aged 87 in a nursing home in Broken Arrow, Oklahoma. Lafferty's funeral took place at Christ the King Catholic Church in Tulsa, where he regularly attended daily Mass. He is buried at St. Rose Catholic Cemetery in Perry.

His collected papers, drafts of novels and short stories, artifacts, and ephemera were donated to the University of Tulsa's McFarlin Library, Department of Special Collections and University Archives. A smaller collection, donated by Lafferty in 1979, is also housed in the University of Iowa Libraries' Special Collections department.

In March 2011, it was announced in Locus that the copyrights to 29 Lafferty novels and 225 short stories were up for sale. The literary estate was soon thereafter purchased by the magazine's nonprofit foundation, under the auspices of board member Neil Gaiman.

== Writing style ==
In his 2006 short story collection Fragile Things, Neil Gaiman includes a short story called "Sunbird" written in the style of Lafferty. In the introduction, he says this about Lafferty:

There was a writer from Tulsa, Oklahoma (he died in 2002), who was, for a little while in the late 1960s and early 1970s, the best short story writer in the world. His name was R. A. Lafferty, and his stories were unclassifiable and odd and inimitable -- you knew you were reading a Lafferty story within a sentence. When I was young I wrote to him, and he wrote back.
"Sunbird" was my attempt to write a Lafferty story, and it taught me a number of things, mostly how much harder they are than they look....

Gaiman and Lafferty had corresponded for several years during Gaiman's adolescence; he remembered Lafferty's letters as "filled with typical cock-eyed Lafferty humour and observations, wise and funny and sober all at once."

Per The Encyclopedia of Science Fiction:

He has fairly been described as a writer of tall tales, as a cartoonist, as an author whose tone was fundamentally oral; his conservative Catholicism has been seen as permeating every word he wrote (or has been ignored); he has been seen as a ransacker of old Mythologies, and as a flippant generator of new ones; he clearly delighted in a vision of the world as being irradiated by conspiracies both godly and devilish, but at times paid scant attention to the niceties of plotting; he has been understood by some as essentially light-hearted and by others as a solitary, stringent moralist; he was technically inventive, but lunged constantly into a slapdash sublime only skittishly evocative, and only occasionally, of anything like the traditional Sense of Wonder; his skill in the deploying of various rhetorical narrative voices was manifest, but these voices were sometimes choked in baroque flamboyance. ... He and Gene Wolfe have more than a shared faith in common.

He has also been compared to the English writer G. K. Chesterton: "[Once a] French publisher nervously asked whether Lafferty minded being compared to G. K. Chesterton (another Catholic author), and there was a terrifying silence that went on and on. Was the great man hideously offended? Eventually, very slowly, he said: 'You're on the right track, kid,' and wandered away."

== Themes ==
Lafferty's quirky prose drew from traditional storytelling styles, largely from the Irish and Native American, and his shaggy-dog characters and tall tales are unique in science fiction. Little of Lafferty's writing is considered typical of the genre. His stories are closer to tall tales than traditional science fiction and are deeply influenced by his Catholic beliefs; Fourth Mansions, for example, draws on The Interior Mansions of Teresa of Ávila.

His writings, both topically and stylistically, are not easy to categorize. Plot is frequently secondary to other elements of Lafferty's writing. While this style has resulted in a loyal cult following, it causes some readers to give up reading his work. Not all of Lafferty's work was science fiction or fantasy. His novel Okla Hannali (1972), published by University of Oklahoma Press, tells the story of the Choctaw in Mississippi, and after the Trail of Tears, in Oklahoma, through an account of the larger-than-life character Hannali and his large family. This novel was thought of highly by Dee Brown, author of Bury My Heart at Wounded Knee (1970), who on the back cover of the edition published by the University of Oklahoma Press, writes "The history of the Choctaw Indians has been told before and is still being told, but it has never been told in the way Lafferty tells it ... Hannali is a buffalo bull of a man who should become one of the enduring characters in the literature of the American Indian." He also wrote, "It is art applied to history so that the legend of the Choctaws, their great and small men, their splendid humor, and their tragedies are filled with life and breath."

== Recognition ==
Lafferty received Hugo Award nominations for Past Master, "Continued on Next Rock", "Sky", and "Eurema's Dam", the last of which won the Best Short Story Hugo in 1973 (shared with Frederik Pohl and Cyril M. Kornbluth's "The Meeting").

He received Nebula Award nominations for "In Our Block", "Slow Tuesday Night", Past Master, Fourth Mansions, "Continued on Next Rock", "Entire And Perfect Chrysolite", and The Devil is Dead. He never received a Nebula award.

His collection Lafferty in Orbit was nominated for a World Fantasy Award, and in 1990, Lafferty received a World Fantasy Lifetime Achievement Award. His 1992 collection Iron Tears was also a finalist for the Philip K. Dick Award. In 2002, he received the Cordwainer Smith Foundation's Rediscovery award.

The Oklahoma Department of Libraries granted him the Arrell Gibson Lifetime Achievement Award in 1995.

Fourth Mansions was also named by David Pringle as one of his selections for Modern Fantasy: The 100 Best Novels.

== Bibliography ==
=== Novels ===
- Past Master (Ace Books, 1968)
- The Reefs of Earth (Berkley Medallion, 1968)
- Space Chantey (Ace Books, 1968)
- Fourth Mansions (Ace Books, 1969)
- Arrive at Easterwine: The Autobiography of a Ktistec Machine (Scribner's, 1971)
- The Devil Is Dead (Avon, 1971). Second (chronologically) in "The Devil Is Dead" trilogy.
- The Fall of Rome (1971). Later reprinted as Alaric: The Day the World Ended (United Mythologies Press, 1993).
- The Flame Is Green (Walker & Co., 1971). First in the unfinished Coscuin Chronicles.
- Okla Hannali (Doubleday, 1972)
- Not to Mention Camels (Bobbs-Merrill, 1976)
- Apocalypses (Pinnacle Books, 1977). Composed of two novels: Where Have You Been, Sandaliotis? and The Three Armageddons of Enniscorthy Sweeney.
- Archipelago (Manuscript Press, 1979). First (chronologically) in "The Devil Is Dead" trilogy.
- Aurelia (Starblaze, 1982)
- Annals of Klepsis (Ace Books, 1983)
- Half a Sky (Corroboree, 1984). Second in the unfinished Coscuin Chronicles.
- Serpent's Egg (Morrigan Publications, 1987)
- East of Laughter (Morrigan Publications, 1988)
- Sindbad: The Thirteenth Voyage (Broken Mirrors Press, 1989)
- The Elliptical Grave (United Mythologies Press, 1989). Also includes the story: "The Man Who Lost His Magic".
- Dotty (United Mythologies Press, 1990)
- Tales of Chicago (United Mythologies Press, 1992). First part of More Than Melchisedech, third (chronologically) in "The Devil Is Dead" trilogy.
- Tales of Midnight (United Mythologies Press, 1992). Second part of More Than Melchisedech.
- Argo (United Mythologies Press, 1992). Third part of More Than Melchisedech.

=== Short story collections ===
- The Six Fingers of Time and Other Stories (Macfadden Books, 1965)
- Nine Hundred Grandmothers (Ace Books, 1970)
- Strange Doings (Scribner's, 1972)
- Does Anyone Else Have Something Further to Add? (Scribner's, 1974)
- Golden Gate and Other Stories (Corroboree, 1982)
- Through Elegant Eyes (Corroboree, 1983)
- Ringing Changes (Ace Books, 1984)
- Episodes of the Argo (United Mythologies Press, 1990)
- Mischief Malicious (And Murder Most Strange) (United Mythologies Press, 1991)
- Lafferty in Orbit (Broken Mirrors Press, 1991)
- Iron Tears (Edgewood Press, 1992)

=== Anthologies ===
- The Collected Short Fiction (Centipede Press, 2014–2025)
  - The Man Who Made Models – The Collected Short Fiction Volume 1 (2014)
  - The Man With the Aura – The Collected Short Fiction Volume 2 (2015)
  - The Man Underneath – The Collected Short Fiction Volume 3 (2015)
  - The Man With The Speckled Eyes – The Collected Short Fiction Volume 4 (2017)
  - The Man Who Walked Through Cracks – The Collected Short Fiction Volume 5 (2018)
  - The Man Who Never Was – The Collected Short Fiction Volume 6 (2021)
  - Mad Man – The Collected Short Fiction Volume 7 (2023)
  - The Man Who Lost His Magic – The Collected Short Fiction Volume 8 (2025)
- More Than Melchisedech (2015). Compiles Tales of Chicago, Tales of Midnight and Argo. Third (chronologically) in "The Devil Is Dead" trilogy.
- Three Great Novels: Space Chantey, Fourth Mansions, Past Master (Gollancz, 2018)
- The Best of R. A. Lafferty (Gollancz, 2019; Tor, 2021)

=== Chapbooks ===
- Horns on Their Heads (Pendragon Press, 1976)
- Funnyfingers & Cabrito (Pendragon Press, 1976)
- Four Stories (Drumm Booklet #7, 1983)
- Laughing Kelly and Other Verses (Drumm Booklet #11, 1983)
- Heart of Stone, Dear and Other Stories (Drumm Booklet #12, 1983)
- Snake in His Bosom and Other Stories (Drumm Booklet #13, 1983)
- The Man Who Made Models and Other Stories (Drumm Booklet #18, 1984)
- Slippery and Other Stories (Drumm Booklet #19, 1985)
- My Heart Leaps Up, in five installments (Drumm Booklets, 1986–90). First book of the "In a Green Tree" autobiographical series.
- Strange Skies (United Mythologies Press, 1988)
- Promontory Goats (United Mythologies Press, 1988)
- The Back Door of History (United Mythologies Press, 1988)
- The Early Lafferty (United Mythologies Press, 1988)
- How Many Miles to Babylon? (United Mythologies Press, 1989)
- The Early Lafferty II (United Mythologies Press, 1990)

=== Non-fiction ===
- It's Down the Slippery Cellar Stairs (Drumm Booklet #14, 1984). Essay collection; later revised and expanded (Borgo Press, 1995).
- True Believers (United Mythologies Press, 1989). Essays, introductions and reviews.
- Cranky Old Man from Tulsa (United Mythologies Press, 1990). Two interviews.

=== Selected short stories ===
- "Through Other Eyes" (Future Science Fiction, February 1960)
- "All the People" (Galaxy Science Fiction, April 1961)
- "The Weirdest World" (Galaxy, June 1961)
- "Aloys" (Galaxy, August 1961)
- "Rainbird" (Galaxy, December 1961)
- "Dream" (Galaxy, June 1962)
- "Sodom and Gomorrah, Texas" (Galaxy, December 1962)
- "What the Name of That Town?" (Galaxy, October 1964)
- "Slow Tuesday Night" (Galaxy, April 1965)
- "Among the Hairy Earthmen" (Galaxy, August 1966)
- "Land of the Great Horses" in Dangerous Visions (Doubleday, 1967)
- "Thus We Frustrate Charlemagne" (Galaxy, February 1967)
- "How They Gave It Back" (Galaxy, February 1968)
- "McGruder's Marvels" (Galaxy, July 1968)
- "Eurema's Dam" in New Dimensions II (Doubleday, 1972)
- "The World as Will and Wallpaper" in Future City (Trident Press, 1973)

== Awards and honors ==
- 1965: Nominated for Nebula Award for "In Our Block" and "Slow Tuesday Night"
- 1970: Nominated for Nebula Award for "Entire and Perfect Chrysolite"
- 1968: Nominated for Nebula Award for Past Master
- 1969: Nominated for Hugo Award for Past Master
- 1970: Nominated for Nebula Award for Fourth Mansions
- 1970: Nominated for Nebula Award for "Continued on Next Rock"
- 1971: Nominated for Hugo Award for "Continued on Next Rock"
- 1971: Nominated for Nebula Award for The Devil Is Dead
- 1972: Nominated for Hugo Award for "Sky"
- 1973: Hugo Award for Best Short Story for "Eurema's Dam"
- 1983: Nominated for Philip K. Dick Award for Aurelia
- 1990: World Fantasy Award—Life Achievement
- 1992: Nominated for World Fantasy Award for Lafferty in Orbit
- 1993: Nominated for Philip K. Dick Award for Iron Tears
- 2002: Cordwainer Smith Rediscovery Award
