= D. G. Compton =

British author (1930–2023)

David Guy Compton
- Born: 19 August 1930; London, England
- Died: 10 November 2023 (aged 93); Maine, U.S.

David Guy Compton (19 August 1930 – 10 November 2023) was a British author who wrote science fiction under the name D. G. Compton. He used the name Guy Compton for his earlier crime novels and the pseudonym Frances Lynch for his Gothic novels. He also wrote short stories, radio plays, and a non-fiction book on stammering, its causes and cures.

== Biography ==
Compton was born in London on 19 August 1930, as the son of actor Gerald Cross and actress Nuna Davey. His first published book was the 1962 crime novel Too Many Murderers. His 1970 novel The Electric Crocodile was nominated for the Nebula Award, and his 1974 novel The Continuous Katherine Mortenhoe was filmed as Death Watch by Bertrand Tavernier in 1979.

The 1983 film Brainstorm was very similar in content to Compton's 1968 novel Synthajoy.

In Science Fiction: History, Science, Vision, Robert Scholes and Eric S. Rabkin write:

Compton's work is informed by an acute and subtle moral sense which avoids the extremes of satire and sentiment while compelling us to see the world ethically...he succeeds superbly in preserving certain traditional fictional values and human values in works of genuine science fiction.

Compton was named the 2007 Author Emeritus by the Science Fiction and Fantasy Writers of America.

Compton died on 10 November 2023, in Maine, United States, where he lived. He was 93.

== Bibliography ==
=== As Guy Compton ===
- Too Many Murderers (1962)
- Medium for Murder (1963)
- Dead on Cue (1964)
- Disguise for a Dead Gentleman (1964)
- High Tide for Hanging (1965)
- And Murder Came Too (1967)

=== As D. G. Compton ===
- The Quality of Mercy (Hodder & Stoughton, 1965; Ace Books, 1970)
- Farewell, Earth's Bliss (Hodder & Stoughton, 1966; Ace Books, 1971)
- The Silent Multitude (Hodder & Stoughton, 1967; Ace Books, 1969)
- Synthajoy (Hodder & Stoughton, 1968; Ace Books, 1968)
- The Palace (Hodder & Stoughton, 1969) (non-SF)
- The Electric Crocodile (Hodder & Stoughton, 1970). Published in US as The Steel Crocodile (Ace Books, 1970).
- Hot Wireless Sets, Aspirin Tablets, the Sandpaper Sides of Used Matchboxes, and Something that Might have been Castor Oil (Michael Joseph, 1971). Published in US as Chronocules (Ace Books, 1970) and later in UK as Chronicules (Arrow Books, 1976).
- The Missionaries (Ace Books, 1972)
- The Continuous Katherine Mortenhoe (Gollancz, 1974). Published in US as The Unsleeping Eye (DAW Books, 1974).
- A Usual Lunacy (Borgo Press, 1978)
- Windows (Berkley/Putnam, 1979)
- Ascendancies (Gollancz, 1980)
- Scudder's Game (Kerosina Books, 1988). The German translation was published earlier in 1984.
- Ragnarok (Gollancz, 1991), with John Gribbin
- Nomansland (Gollancz, 1993)
- Stammering: its nature, history, causes and cures (1993) (non-fiction)
- Justice City (Gollancz, 1994)
- Back of Town Blues (Gollancz, 1996)
- Die Herren von Talojz (The Lords of Talojz) (Heyne, 1997). Published in German translation.

=== As Frances Lynch ===
- Twice Ten Thousand Miles (1974)
- The Fine and Handsome Captain (1975)
- Stranger at the Wedding (1976)
- A Dangerous Magic (1978)
- In the House of Dark Music (1979)
