= Alexei Panshin =

American writer and critic (1940–2022)

- Born: August 14, 1940 Lansing, Michigan, U.S.
- Died: August 21, 2022 (aged 82)
- Occupation: Novelist, critic
- Genre: Science fiction
- Years active: 1967–1991
- Notable works: Rite of Passage, The World Beyond the Hill
- Notable awards: Nebula Award (1968); Hugo Award (1990)
- Spouse: Cory Panshin

Alexei Panshin (August 14, 1940 – August 21, 2022) was an American writer and science fiction critic. He wrote several critical works and several novels, including the 1968 Nebula Award–winning novel Rite of Passage and, with his wife Cory Panshin, the 1990 Hugo Award–winning study of science fiction The World Beyond the Hill.

== Personal life ==
Panshin was born in Lansing, Michigan, on August 14, 1940. He died on August 21, 2022, at the age of 82.

== Career ==
=== Fiction ===
Panshin was the author of the Anthony Villiers series made up of Star Well, The Thurb Revolution, and Masque World. A fourth volume, entitled The Universal Pantograph, never appeared, reputedly because of conflicts between the writer and his publisher. Of the Villiers series, noted SF writer Samuel R. Delany writes in the foreword of Star Well:

It ... examines the proposition that the world is composed of small communities of mutual interest ... [Star Well] is a gallery of gamblers, duels and double-crosses, a minuet of manners and manners mangled; the machinery of the universe is speculated upon; inspector generals arrive to inspect it. And Anthony Villiers, gentleman par excellence, dashes through it all, buckling a swash or two, bungling a couple of others.

New Celebrations, an omnibus volume collecting the first three volumes, has appeared.

Panshin wrote a novel, Earth Magic with his wife, Cory Panshin. His works also include a short story collection, Farewell To Yesterday's Tomorrow.

== Nonfiction ==
Panshin published a study of the prominent American science fiction author Robert A. Heinlein, Heinlein in Dimension.

Most of this work was originally published in fanzines, for which Panshin won the Best Fan Writer Hugo award in 1967. The writings were then published in book form by Advent. Panshin discusses reactions to this work on his website The Abyss of Wonder.

Panshin's general critical work SF in Dimension (1976) was also co-written with Cory Panshin, as was his lengthy theoretical-critical The World Beyond The Hill: Science Fiction and the Quest for Transcendence (1989), which received a Hugo Award for Best Related Work. A number of Alexei Panshin's books (including The World Beyond the Hill) are being republished by Phoenix Pick, an imprint of Arc Manor Publishers.

== Published work ==
=== Fiction ===
==== Novels ====
- Alexei Panshin (1968). Rite of Passage. New York: Ace Books. Ace 72781.
- Alexei Panshin (1968). Star Well. New York: Ace Books. pp. 157. ISBN 0-441-78405-4. Ace G-756.
- Alexei Panshin (1968). The Thurb Revolution. New York: Ace Books. ISBN 0-441-80855-7. Ace G-762.
- Alexei Panshin (1969). Masque World. New York: Ace Books. p. 156. ISBN 0-441-52105-3. Ace 2320 - ISBN applies to 1978 paperback reprint.
- Alexei Panshin; Cory Panshin (1978). Earth Magic. New York: Ace Books. p. 275. ISBN 0-441-18120-1.

==== Short fiction collections ====
- Alexei Panshin (1975). Farewell to Yesterday's Tomorrow. New York: Berkley/Putnam. pp. 184. ISBN 0-399-11505-6.
- Alexei Panshin; Cory Panshin (1982). Transmutations: A Book of Personal Alchemy. Dublin, Pa.: Elephant Books. p. 214.

=== Nonfiction ===
- Alexei Panshin (1968). Heinlein in Dimension: A Critical Analysis. Chicago: Advent Publishers. pp. 214. ISBN 0-911682-12-0.
- Alexei Panshin; Cory Panshin (1976). SF in Dimension: A Book of Explorations. Chicago: Advent Publishers. p. 342. ISBN 0-911682-21-X.
- Alexei Panshin; Cory Panshin (1989). The World Beyond the Hill: Science Fiction and the Quest for Transcendence. Los Angeles: Jeremy P. Tarcher, Inc. p. 685. ISBN 0-87477-554-X.
