= Charles Stross bibliography =

This is a list of books by British hard science fiction, Lovecraftian horror, and space opera author Charles Stross.

== Bibliography ==
=== Stand-alone novels ===
- Scratch Monkey (released, 1993; published, 2011) available online
- Accelerando (2005, ISBN 0-441-01284-1) available online
- Glasshouse (2006, ISBN 0-441-01403-8)
- Palimpsest (2011 novella)
- The Rapture of the Nerds (2012, collaboration with Cory Doctorow), available online

=== Eschaton series ===
- Singularity Sky (2003, ISBN 0-441-01072-5)
- Iron Sunrise (2004, ISBN 1-84149-335-X)

Stross has announced that he is unlikely to write a third book in this series.

=== The Laundry Files ===
A series of science fiction spy thrillers about Bob Howard (a pseudonym taken for security purposes), a one-time I.T. consultant, now field agent working for British government agency "the Laundry", which deals with occult threats. Influenced by Lovecraft's visions of the future, and set in a world where a computer and the right mathematical equations is just as useful a tool-set for calling up horrors from other dimensions as a spell-book and a pentagram on the floor.

1. The Atrocity Archives (2004, ISBN 1-930846-25-8)
  - Also contains the extra story The Concrete Jungle, set about a year after the main story. Best Novella winner, 2005 Hugo Awards
2. The Jennifer Morgue (2006, ISBN 1-930846-45-2 – set around three years after The Concrete Jungle)
  - Also contains the extra story Pimpf, set within a year of the main story
3. The Fuller Memorandum (2010, ISBN 1-84149-770-3 – set about eight years after The Atrocity Archives)
4. The Apocalypse Codex (2012 – set about nine months after The Fuller Memorandum)
5. The Rhesus Chart, (2014, ISBN 978-0-425-25686-2)
6. The Annihilation Score (2015, ISBN 978-0-356-50531-2)
7. The Nightmare Stacks (2016, ISBN 978-0-425-28119-2)
8. The Delirium Brief (2017, ISBN 978-0765394668)
9. The Labyrinth Index (2018, ISBN 978-1-250-19608-8)
10. The Regicide Report, final book in the series, planned for release in January 2026.

==== Novellas ====
- Down on the Farm (2008 novelette – set about two years after Pimpf) available online, archived from the original
- Overtime (2009 novelette – set about five months after The Fuller Memorandum) available online
- Equoid (2013 novelette – takes place after the events of Down on the Farm, before the events of The Fuller Memorandum) available online
- Escape from Yokai Land (2022 novella – takes place at the same time as The Nightmare Stacks, right before The Delirium Brief; ISBN 978-1250805706)
- A Conventional Boy (short novel released on 7 January 2025, taking place between The Apocalypse Codex and The Rhesus Chart). The book also contains Down on the Farm and Overtime (ISBN 978-0356524641).

==== Tales of the New Management ====
Tales of the New Management is a spin-off from the main series, set after CASE NIGHTMARE GREEN.

1. Dead Lies Dreaming (2020, ISBN 978-1250267023)
2. Quantum of Nightmares (2022, ISBN 978-1250839374)
3. Season of Skulls (2023, ISBN 978-1250839404)

==== Game ====
Stross also authorised, but did not write, an official role-playing game, The Laundry (2010, ISBN 1-907204-93-8, Gareth Hanrahan, published by Cubicle 7) and a number of supplements based on the "Bob Howard – Laundry" series. The system uses an adaptation of the Call of Cthulhu RPG rules (under licence from Chaosium).

=== The Merchant Princes series ===
The Merchant Princes is a series in which some humans have an ability to travel between parallel Earths, which have differing levels of technology. This series is science fiction, even though it was originally marketed by the publisher as fantasy. It was originally intended to be a trilogy, but at the end the writing of the first novel, the publisher requested that it be split for shorter length, and this length carried over to the other novels. The first three books were collectively nominated for and won the Sidewise Award for Alternate History in 2007.

1. The Family Trade (2004, ISBN 0-7653-0929-7)
2. The Hidden Family (2005, ISBN 0-7653-1347-2)
3. The Clan Corporate (2006, ISBN 0-7653-0930-0)
4. The Merchants' War (2007, ISBN 0-7653-1671-4)
5. The Revolution Business (2009, ISBN 0-7653-1672-2)
6. The Trade of Queens (2010, ISBN 0-7653-1673-0)
7. Empire Games (2017, ISBN 0-7653-3756-8)
8. Dark State (2018, ISBN 0-7653-3757-6)
9. Invisible Sun (2021, ISBN 1-2508-0709-3)

The first six books were later re-edited back into the originally intended form as three longer novels. The new books were released in the UK beginning in April 2013, and in DRM-free format in the United States in January 2014.

1. The Bloodline Feud ISBN 978-1447237617 (contains The Family Trade and The Hidden Family)
2. The Traders' War ISBN 978-1447237624 (contains The Clan Corporate and The Merchants' War)
3. The Revolution Trade ISBN 978-1447237648 (contains The Revolution Business and The Trade of Queens)

=== Halting State series ===
Science-fiction/crime novels set 'fifteen minutes in the future' which concentrate on life in the early 21st century, which are centered in Edinburgh in an independent Scotland, and how innovations in policing, surveillance, economics, computer games, the internet, memes and other inventions may change our lives in the future. Both novels are told in second-person viewpoint. The series was originally planned to be a trilogy but Stross claimed his current plot idea were mooted by the Snowden revelations and he was no longer planning a third book.

- Halting State (2007, ISBN 978-0-441-01498-9)
- Rule 34 (2011, ISBN 978-0-441-02034-8) (takes place 5 years after Halting State)
- The Lambda Functionary (was planned for 2014, but plans cancelled in 2013)

=== Saturn's Children series ===
Stross's space opera series, featuring the android society that develops after the extinction of humanity. Stross has referred to the setting for these stories as the "Freyaverse."

- Saturn's Children (2008, ISBN 0-441-01594-8)
- "Bit Rot", short story in Engineering Infinity (2010, ISBN 1-907-51952-1) available online
- Neptune's Brood (2013, ISBN 0-425-25677-4)

=== Omnibus titles ===
The Science Fiction Book Club has published omnibus editions in the US that combine two books, without new material.

- Timelike Diplomacy (2004; combines Singularity Sky and Iron Sunrise)
- On Her Majesty's Occult Service (2007, combines The Atrocity Archives and The Jennifer Morgue)

=== Collections ===
- Toast: And Other Rusted Futures (2002, ISBN 1-58715-413-7) available online, containing
  - "Toast: A Con Report” (Interzone, August 1998)
  - “Extracts from the Club Diary” (Odyssey 3, 1998)
  - “Ship of Fools” (Interzone 98, June 1995)
  - “Dechlorinating the Moderator” (Interzone 101, 1996)
  - “Yellow Snow” (Interzone 37, July 1990)
  - “Lobsters” (Asimov’s SF Magazine, June 2001); Best Novelette nominee, 2002 Hugo Awards
  - "Antibodies" (Interzone 157, July 2000)
  - "Bear Trap" (Spectrum SF 1, January 2000)
  - "A Colder War" (Spectrum SF 3, August 2000) available online
- Wireless: The Essential Charles Stross (2009, ISBN 978-0-441-01719-5), containing
  - "Rogue Farm" (Live Without a Net, 2003, edited by Lou Anders, ISBN 978-0-451-45945-9)
  - "Unwirer" with Cory Doctorow (ReVisions, 2004 edited by Julie E. Czerneda and Isaac Szpindel, ISBN 978-0-7564-0240-2)
  - "MAXOS" (Stross, Charles; Haafkens, Caroline; Mohammed, Wasiu (25 August 2005). "MAXO signals". Nature. 436 (7504): 1206. Bibcode:2005Natur.436.1206S. doi:10.1038/4361206a.)
  - "Missile Gap" (One Million A.D., 2005, edited by Gardner Dozois, ISBN 978-0-7394-6273-7)
  - "Snowball's Chance" (Nova Scotia: New Scottish Speculative Fiction, 2005, edited by Neil Williamson and Andrew J. Wilson, ISBN 978-1-84183-086-5)
  - "Trunk and Disorderly" (Asimov's Science Fiction, 2007)
  - "Down on the Farm" (Tor.com, 2008) available online
  - "Palimpsest"; Best Novella winner, 2010 Hugo Awards

=== Short fiction ===
- Halo (2002, novelette)
- Missile Gap (2007, ISBN 1-59606-058-1; novella) available online
- "Minutes of the Labour Party Conference 2016" (2007, short story in the Glorifying Terrorism anthology)
- "A Bird in Hand" (2011, short story in the Fables from the Fountain anthology; 1st ed., NewCon Press, 2011; 2nd ed., NewCon Press, 2018 ISBN 978-1-910935-74-3)
- "A Tall Tail" (2012, short story), available online

=== Non-fiction ===
- The Web Architect's Handbook (1996, ISBN 0-201-87735-X)
