= Wormholes in fiction =

Depictions of a spatial anomaly

Wormhole
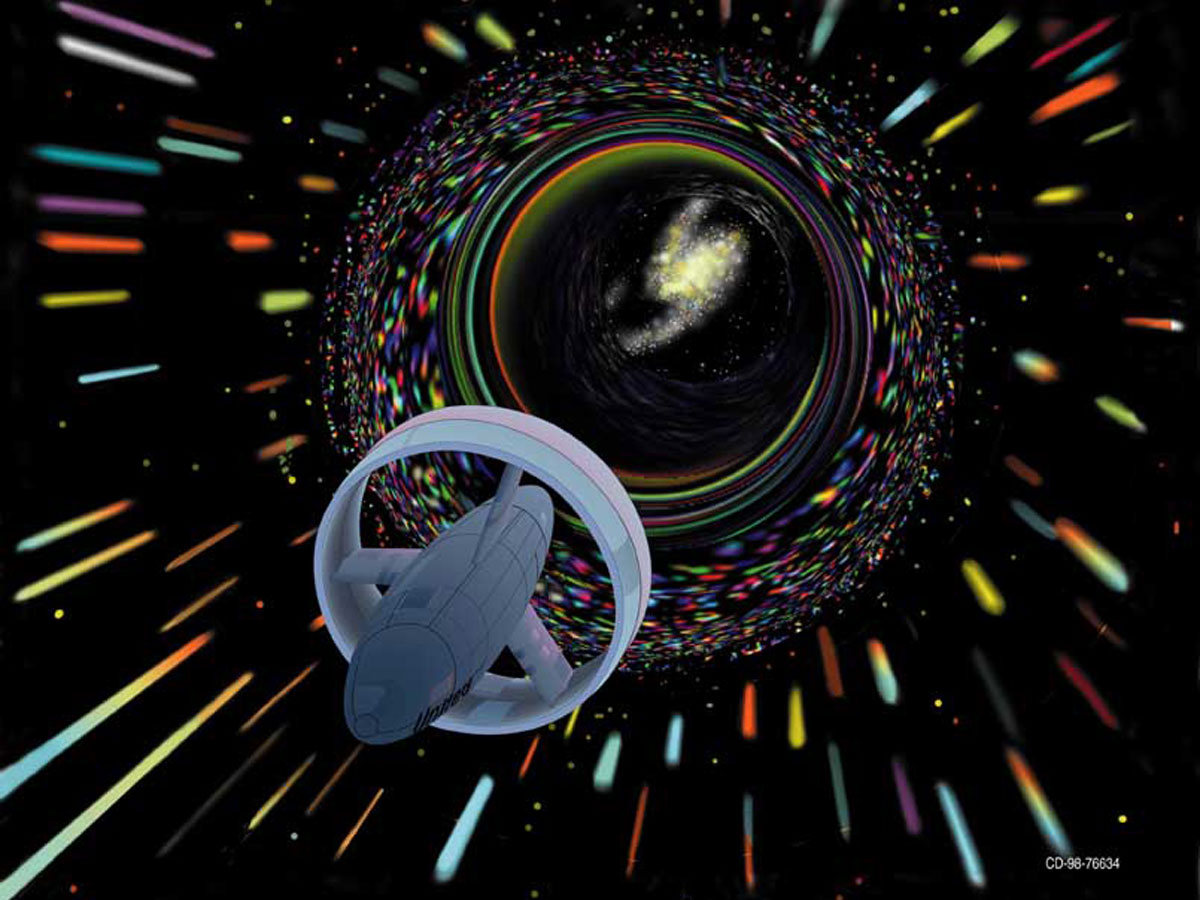
- Artist's impression of wormhole travel
- Created by: Einstein–Rosen
- Genre: Science fiction

In-universe information
- Location: Space
- Type: Transportation
- Classification: Pseudo-scientific fiction
- First proposed: 1916
- Re-proposed: 1935

A wormhole is a postulated method, within the general theory of relativity, of moving from one point in space to another without crossing the space between. Wormholes are a popular feature of science fiction as they allow faster-than-light interstellar travel within human timescales.

A related concept in various fictional genres is the portable hole. While there's no clear demarcation between the two, this article deals with fictional, but pseudo-scientific, treatments of faster-than-light travel through space.

A jumpgate is a fictional device able to create an Einstein–Rosen bridge portal (or wormhole), allowing fast travel between two points in space.

== In franchises ==
=== Stargate franchise ===
Wormholes are the principal means of space travel in the Stargate movie and the spin-off television series, Stargate SG-1, Stargate Atlantis and Stargate Universe, to the point where it was called the franchise that is "far and away most identified with wormholes". The central plot device of the programs is an ancient transportation network consisting of the ring-shaped devices known as Stargates, which generate artificial wormholes that allow one-way matter transmission and two-way radio communication between gates when the correct spatial coordinates are "dialed".

=== Babylon 5 and Crusade ===
In television series Babylon 5 and its spin-off series Crusade, jump points are artificial wormholes that serve as entrances and exits to hyperspace, allowing for faster-than-light travel. Jump points can either be created by larger ships (battleships, destroyers, etc.) or by standalone jumpgates.

In the B5 universe, jumpgates are considered neutral territory. It is considered a violation of normal rules of engagement to attack them directly, as the jumpgate network is needed by every known spacefaring race. However, in wartime, it is common for powers to program their gates to deny access to opposing sides, thus forcing enemies to use their own jump points.

=== Farscape ===
The television series Farscape features an American astronaut who accidentally gets shot through a wormhole and ends up in a distant part of the universe, and also features the use of wormholes to reach other universes (or "unrealized realities") and as weapons of mass destruction.

Wormholes are the cause of John Crichton's presence in the far reaches of our galaxy and the focus of an arms race of different alien species attempting to obtain Crichton's perceived ability to control them. Crichton's brain was secretly implanted with knowledge of wormhole technology by one of the last members of an ancient alien species. Later, an alien interrogator discovers the existence of the hidden information and thus Crichton becomes embroiled in interstellar politics and warfare while being pursued by all sides, as they want the ability to use wormholes as weapons. Unable to directly access the information, Crichton is able to subconsciously foretell when and where wormholes will form and is able to safely travel through them, while all attempts by others are fatal. By the end of the series, he eventually works out some of the science and is able to create his own wormholes and shows his pursuers the consequences of a wormhole weapon.

=== Star Trek franchise ===
- Early in the storyline of Star Trek: The Motion Picture, an antimatter imbalance in the refitted Enterprise starship's warp drive power systems creates an unstable ship-generated wormhole directly ahead of the vessel, threatening to rip the starship apart partially through its increasingly severe time dilation effects, until Commander Pavel Chekov fires a photon torpedo to blast apart a sizable asteroid that was pulled in with the starship (and directly ahead of it), destabilizing the wormhole effect and throwing the Enterprise clear as it slowed to sub-light velocities. Near the end of the film, Willard Decker recalls that "Voyager 6" (a.k.a. V'ger) disappeared into what they used to call a "black hole". At one time, black holes in science fiction were often endowed with the traits of wormholes. This has for the most part disappeared as a black hole is not a hole in space, but a dense mass and the visible vortex effect often associated with black holes is merely the accretion disk of visible matter being drawn toward it. Decker's line is most likely to inform that it was probably a wormhole that Voyager 6 entered, although the intense gravity of a black hole does warp the fabric of spacetime.
- In the Star Trek: The Next Generation episode "A Matter of Time", Captain Jean-Luc Picard acknowledged that since the first wormholes were discovered students had been asked questions about the ramifications of accidentally changing history for the worse through knowledge obtained by traveling through wormholes.
- The setting of the television series Star Trek: Deep Space Nine is a space station, Deep Space 9, located near the artificially-created Bajoran wormhole. This wormhole is unique in the Star Trek universe because of its stability. In an earlier episode of Star Trek: The Next Generation, it was established that wormholes are generally unstable on one or both ends – either the ends move erratically or they do not open reliably. The Bajoran wormhole is stationary on both ends and opens consistently, bridging the Alpha and Gamma quadrants and enabling starship travel across vast distances. It serves as a strategic gateway that introduces the Alpha quadrant to the threatening Dominion and provides one method of communication with the non-physical entities, known as the Prophets, who inhabit it. Discovered at the start of the series, the existence of the wormhole and the various consequences of its discovery elevate the strategic importance of the space station and is a major factor in most of the overarching plots over the course of the series.
- In the Star Trek: Voyager episode "Counterpoint", an alien scientist explains that the term wormhole is often used as a layman's term and describes various spatial anomalies. Examples for those wormholes in Star Trek are intermittent cyclical vortex, interspatial fissure, interspatial flexure or spatial flexure in episode "Q2" respectively spatial vortex in episode "Night". In the episode "Inside Man" an artificially created wormhole was named geodesic fold.
- In the 2009 Star Trek film, red matter is used to create artificial black holes. A large one acts a conduit between spacetime and sends Spock and Nero back in time.

=== Doctor Who ===
- The Rift which appears in the long-running British science-fiction series Doctor Who and its spin-off Torchwood is a wormhole. One of its mouths is located in Cardiff Bay, Wales and the other floats freely throughout space-time. It is the central plot device in the latter show.
- In "Planet of the Dead", a wormhole transports a London double-decker bus to a barren, desert-like planet. The wormhole could only be navigated safely through by a metal object, and human tissue is not meant for inter-space travel, as demonstrated by the bus driver, who is burnt to the bones on attempting to get back to Earth.

It is discussed that the Time Vortex was created by the Time Lords (an ancient and powerful race of human-looking aliens that can control space and time; the protagonist is one of them) to allow travel of TARDISes (Time And Relative Dimension In Space) to any point in spacetime.

=== Marvel Cinematic Universe ===
- In the 2011 film Thor, the Bifrost is reimagined as an Einstein–Rosen Bridge which is operated by the gatekeeper, Heimdall, and used by Asgardians to travel between the Nine Realms.
- In the 2012 film The Avengers, Loki uses the Tesseract to arrive on Earth and summon the Chitauri to invade New York.
- In the 2013 film Thor: The Dark World, the Bifrost Bridge is repaired using the Tesseract, and is once again used by Asgardians for space travel. Additionally, Jane Foster and her associates encounter a wormhole in London which teleports her to Svartalfheim.
- In the 2017 film Thor: Ragnarok, Thor is teleported to the planet Sakaar via a wormhole, where he learns that Bruce Banner and Loki had both landed on the planet via wormholes as well. The largest one, referred to as the "Devil's Anus", is described by Banner as "a collapsing Neutron Star within an Einstein-Rosen Bridge".
- In the 2018 film Avengers: Infinity War, Thanos acquires the Space Stone from the Statesman and uses it to generate wormholes and travel between different points of the Universe.

== In literature ==
In some earlier analyses of general relativity, the event horizon of a black hole was believed to form an Einstein-Rosen bridge.

Title	Author	Year	Description
The Forever War	Joe Haldeman	1974	In the classic war novel interstellar travel is achieved through gateways located at collapsars. This is an early word for a black hole, and the novel refers to the (now obsolete) theory that black holes may contain Einstein–Rosen Bridges.
"Mrs. Todd's Shortcut"	Stephen King	1984	In the fantasy short story, an elderly woman is obsessed with finding shortcuts through her hometown stumble upon a wormhole to another dimension, which makes her younger with every trip she takes.
Contact	Carl Sagan	1985	In the novel, a crew of five humans make a trip to the center of the Milky Way galaxy through a transportation system consisting of a series of wormholes. The novel is notable in that Kip Thorne advised Sagan on the possibilities of wormholes. Likewise, wormholes are also central to the film version.
Vorkosigan Saga	Lois McMaster Bujold	1986	In the series naturally occurring wormholes form the basis for interstellar travel. The world of Barrayar was isolated from the rest of human civilization for centuries after the connecting wormhole collapsed, until a new route was discovered, and control over wormhole routes and jumps is the frequent subject of political plots and military campaigns.
Xeelee series	Stephen Baxter	1989	In the fictional world, humans use wormholes to traverse the Solar System. A wormhole is also used in this universe to put a probe into the Sun (the wormhole is utilized to cool the probe, throwing out solar material fast enough to keep the probe at operating temperatures). In his book Ring, the Xeelee construct a gigantic wormhole into a different universe which they use to escape the onslaught of the Photino birds.
Honorverse series	David Weber	1994	In this fictional universe, wormholes have an important impact in the economy of the different star nations, as it greatly reduces travel time between two different points. The Star Kingdom of Manticore, to which the main character belongs, is a powerful economic entity thanks to the Manticore Junction, a set of six (a seventh being discovered during the course of the books) wormholes, close to Manticore's binary system, that ensure much travel goes through their system. It also can play a role in the military side of things, but usage of the wormhole destabilizes it for a time proportional to the size of the starship using it.
His Dark Materials	Philip Pullman	1995	Wormholes are an immensely important plot device in the trilogy, with one first discovered by protagonist Will Parry, when fleeing from his home after an accidental murder; he finds a window in the air in an Oxford street which leads to a totally different universe, the town of Cittagazze. In the rest of the trilogy, the other main characters use wormholes in the form of these extradimensional windows in order to travel "between worlds" and thus speed their journeys.
Einstein's Bridge	John G. Cramer	1997	The novel features travel via wormholes between alternate universes.
Diaspora	Greg Egan	1997	The novel features scientifically well founded depictions of wormholes.
Timeline	Michael Crichton	1999	In the novel traversable wormholes are used for time travel along with the theory of quantum foam.
The Light of Other Days	Arthur C. Clarke and Stephen Baxter	2000	The novel discusses the problems which arise when a wormhole is used for faster-than-light communication. In the novel the authors suggest that wormholes can join points distant either in time or in space and postulate a world completely devoid of privacy as wormholes are increasingly used to spy on anyone at any time in the world's history.
Commonwealth Saga	Peter F. Hamilton	2002	The series describes how wormhole technology could be used to explore, colonize and connect to other worlds without having to resort to traditional travel via starships. This technology is the basis of the formation of the titular Intersolar Commonwealth, and is used so extensively that it is possible to ride trains between the planets of the Commonwealth.
The Algebraist	Iain M. Banks	2004	In the novel traversable wormholes can be artificially created and are a central factor/resource in the stratification of space-faring civilizations.
House of Suns	Alastair Reynolds	2008	The novel features a wormhole to Andromeda. One main character also alludes to other wormhole mouths leading to galaxies in the Local Group and beyond. In the books, all wormhole-linked galaxies are cloaked by Absences, which prevent information escaping the galaxy and thus protecting causality from being violated by FTL travel.
Palimpsest	Charles Stross	2009	An original story in the 2009 collection Wireless: The Essential Charles Stross – which won the 2010 Hugo Award for Best Novella – the protagonist creates and uses temporary wormholes to travel through both space and time.
The Expanse	James S.A Corey	2012	A virus shot at the Solar System millions of years ago constructs a ring in space that creates a wormhole to another dimension which is a "hub" of 1373 wormholes that lead to other solar systems.

== In music ==
Wormholes in music
Album/Song	Description
Universal Migrator Part 2: Flight of the Migrator	On Ayreon's album, Universal Migrator Part 2: Flight of the Migrator, a soul is sucked into a black hole in the song "Into the Black Hole", goes through a wormhole in the song "Through the Wormhole", and leaves from a white hole in the song "Out of the White Hole".
Crack the Skye	Mastodon's concept album Crack the Skye deals with a paraplegic child sucked into a wormhole.

== In games ==
Wormholes in video games
Game	Description
Space Rogue	The science fiction computer game Space Rogue featured the use of technologically harnessed wormholes called "Malir gates" as mechanisms for interstellar travel. Navigation through the space within wormholes was a part of gameplay and had its own perils.
Freelancer	Wormholes are also seen in the computer game Freelancer, commonly referred as "jump holes". They are supposed to be black hole-like formations with ultra-high gravity amounts, that work like 'portals' for players to travel instantly between different star systems. The game also features "jump gates", which are described as devices capable of generating an artificial jump hole.
Darkspace	In the Massively Multiplayer Online Game Darkspace, a player-versus-player starship combat game, players can create short-term stable wormholes to traverse the game's universe instantly, rather than use the game's concept of FTL travel to move from point A to point B. Wormhole Generation Devices are only available on ships with higher rank requirements, usually Vice Admiral or above, and are most common on Space Stations.
Orion's Arm	In the on-line fictional collaborative world-building project "Orion's Arm", wormholes are used for communication and transport between the millions of colonies in the local part of the Milky way Galaxy. In an attempt to make the physics of the wormhole travel at least semi-plausible, large amounts of ANEC-violating exotic energy are required to maintain the holes, which are nevertheless large objects which must be maintained on the outermost reaches of the planetary systems concerned.
X computer game series	In the X computer game series by Egosoft, wormholes were established using Jump Gates, created by the Old Ones. These Jump Gates connected to many systems but not the Solar System. Humanity advanced to the technological level to create Jump Gate technology and discovered the already established gate network. Hundreds of years after cutting themselves off from the network to escape the Xenon, they created a Jumpdrive, allowing for travel between systems not connected directly via a gate. Different versions of Jumpdrives emerged with some being limited but stable, others being dangerously random.
Metroid Prime 3: Corruption	In Metroid Prime 3: Corruption, Phazon-based organic meteors called Leviathans create wormholes to travel from Phaaze (the living planet they are "born" in) to other planets. They do this to "corrupt" the planet and any beings able to survive the Phazon into Phazon-based creatures. The planet would then progress into changing its environment until it becomes another planet like Phaaze. The Galactic Federation took control of one with Samus Aran's assistance, and used it to travel to and destroy Phaaze.
Far Gate	Wormholes are used frequently in Far Gate as a means of transporting spacecraft across interstellar distances.
Star Trek: Shattered Universe	In Star Trek: Shattered Universe, while in the Mirror Universe, the USS Excelsior (NCC-2000) encounters a wormhole similar to the one the USS Enterprise NCC-1701 in Star Trek: The Motion Picture the player must defend Excelsior from on coming asteroids and pursuing Starships of the Terran Empire, the evil Mirror Universe counterpart of the United Federation of Planets, until the ship can exit the wormhole.
Crysis 3	In Crysis 3, the Alpha Ceph combines its energy with the energy of a C.E.L.L. orbital strike to create an Einstein–Rosen Bridge, thus allowing a Stage Three Ceph Invasion Force to be rapidly transported from Messier 33 to Earth in a matter of minutes.
EVE Online	Stargates, also known as jump gates, are the primary means of interstellar travel for players in EVE Online. In-universe, the exact way in which jump gates function is unknown: "While functions of jump gates are well known from a theoretical point of view, there still remain a lot of unanswered questions about the fundamentals of dimensional inter-connections." In 2009, the expansion Apocrypha added wormholes to the game, which differ from stargates by being less stable and more random and adding an entire new dimension to the game.
Stellaris	The science-fiction strategy game Stellaris features wormholes spread throughout the galaxy. The player may research technology to stabilize wormholes and travel through them to reach a linked wormhole elsewhere in the galaxy.
Command & Conquer 3: Tiberium Wars	One of the three main factions, the Scrin, can construct a "Rift Generator", their in-game superweapon, which creates a wormhole that pulls in nearby units to deep space. Additionally, The Scrin have an ability to create wormholes to instantly teleport units around the battlefield, so long as they have a building called "Signal Transmitter".
Pokémon Sun and Moon and Pokémon Ultra Sun and Ultra Moon	Ultra Wormholes were introduced within the seventh generation of Pokémon. They are interdimensional wormholes leading to different universes inhabited by surreal Pokémon called Ultra Beasts. In Alola related games, they are a major plot element and have made further appearances in titles such as Pokémon Sword and Shield and Pokémon Go.

== In television and film fiction ==
Film/episode	Description
The Triangle	The 2005 three-part US-British-German science fiction miniseries The Triangle uses a wormhole to explain mysterious disappearances in the Bermuda Triangle.
Invader Zim	In an episode of the animated series Invader Zim wherein Zim, in order to get rid of Dib and his horrible classmates once and for all, utilizes a wormhole to send Dib and the other Skoolkids on a one-way busride to an alternate dimension containing a room with a moose. However, Dib discovers Zim's plan, and taking advantage of a fork in the wormhole, is able to transport the bus back to Earth.
Event Horizon	In the movie Event Horizon, the titular ship is designed to create an artificial wormhole. However, the wormhole doesn't lead to anywhere in the known universe, but to an alternate, horrific reality.
Fringe	In the television series Fringe, the main storyline is the investigation of an unusual series of events and scientific experiments called the Pattern. In the second-season episode "Peter" it's revealed that the root cause of the Pattern was an incident in 1985 where Dr. Walter Bishop opened a wormhole into an alternate universe so that he may cure the alternate version of his terminally ill son, Peter (who had died in our universe). By crossing the wormhole, Dr. Bishop disrupted the fundamental laws of nature and weakened the fabric of space-time, causing incalculable destruction in the alternate universe and forcing them to seek a way to repair the damage caused and save their existence.
Power Rangers Time Force	In Power Rangers Time Force, artificial Temporal Wormholes were used extensively for the delivery of the Time Fliers to travel to the past to aid the Rangers and was also used by Wes, Eric and Commandocon to travel to prehistoric times to recover the Quantasaurus Rex. In Power Rangers SPD, in the episode Wormhole, Gruumm and later the SPD Rangers used a "Temporal Wormole" to travel from 2025 to 2004 to battle with the Dino Thunder Rangers in early 21st century Reefside.
"Vanishing Act" (The Outer Limits episode)	The 21st episode of the 1995 Canadian science fiction TV series The Outer Limits, "Vanishing Act", tells the story of a man who is abducted by an alien race through wormholes and later returned to his family every ten years.
Sliders	In the FOX/Sci-Fi series Sliders, a method is found to create a wormhole that allows travel not between distant points but between different parallel universes; objects or people that travel through the wormhole begin and end in the same location geographically (e.g. if one leaves San Francisco, one will arrive in an alternate San Francisco) and chronologically (if it is 1999 at the origin point, so it is at the destination, at least by the currently accepted calendar on our Earth.) Early in the series, the wormhole is referred to by the name "Einstein–Rosen–Podolsky bridge," apparently a merging of the concepts of an Einstein–Rosen bridge and the Einstein–Podolsky–Rosen paradox, a thought-experiment in quantum mechanics. This series presumes that we exist as part of a multiverse and asks what might have resulted had major or minor events in history occurred differently; the wormholes in the series allow access to the alternate universes in which the series is set.
Déjà Vu	The 2006 film Déjà Vu is based on a phenomenon caused by a wormhole, specifically referred to as an Einstein–Rosen Bridge.
The Lost Room	The Lost Room is a science fiction television miniseries that aired on the Sci Fi Channel in the United States. The main character is allowed to travel around the planet when using a special key together with any kind of door, leading him to random locations. The key is part of a series of different artifacts, coming from an alternate reality.
Bill & Ted's Excellent Adventure	Bill & Ted's Excellent Adventure is a 1989 American science fiction–comedy buddy film and the first film in the Bill & Ted franchise in which two metalhead slackers travel through a temporal wormhole in order to assemble a menagerie of historical figures for their high school history presentation.
Primeval: New World	In the Primeval spin-off series Primeval: New World, Lt. Kenneth Leeds theorizes that the anomalies, the central plot point of the series which allow dinosaurs and other prehistoric creatures into the present day, are Einstein–Rosen Bridges after discovering the Spaghetti Junction in the Season 1 finale. However, this seems unlikely since they do not exist within black holes and do not allow travel across distances beyond the Earth yet, only through time.
Rick and Morty	In the animated show, the main protagonist Rick Sanchez uses what's referred to as a 'portal gun' as a plot device to travel to different universes, dimensions and realities. Despite being described by Adult Swim as its "most scientifically accurate animated comedy", the rules of inter-dimensional travel are usually played for laughs, often spoofing common science fiction tropes and popular culture approaches to the multiverse.
Voltron: Legendary Defender	In the animated show, the main way of travel in space are Wormholes, created by the power of Altean Magic. The show's protagonist use wormholes to escape dangerous situation or to fly away from a fight.
Interstellar	In the 2014 film Interstellar, scientists at NASA discover a wormhole orbiting the planet of Saturn, and send a team to travel through it to a distant galaxy in order to find a new home for the human race before Earth is unfit for life. The wormhole takes them halfway across the observable universe to another star system, containing a huge black hole named Gargantua. This new system has three candidate planets for re-seeding the human race, two of which orbit the black hole. In the movie, the wormhole is implied to have been placed there by future humans for the present humans to find a new home. The wormhole is described as the surface of a ball.
The Flash	In the CW Network Superhero sci-fi, wormholes play a vital role in the series.
Strange Days at Blake Holsey High	The television program features a wormhole that can lead to either the future or the past.
Futurama	In the final scene of the direct-to-video movie, Into the Wild Green Yonder, the series protagonists travel through a wormhole. The movie also features black holes as part of Leo Wong's golf course. In the episode following the movie, Rebirth, Professor Farnsworth names the wormhole as the Panama Wormhole, after the Panama Canal, calling it as "Earth's central channel for shipping." The characters also travel through a wormhole back to the year 1947 and back to the future in the December 8, 2001, episode, Roswell That Ends Well.
Mirakel	In 2020, two Swedish scientists, Vilgot and Anna-Karin, develop an artificial wormhole (also known as an artificial black hole) in an attempt to control the electricity market. It malfunctions and instead causes two girls, Mira in 2020 and Rakel in 1920, to travel through time and swap bodies with each other.
The 100	In season six of The CW series, the characters first encounter what they call an anomaly, believing that whoever goes in does not come back out. In the seventh and final season, it is revealed these wormholes are activated by what are known as anomaly stones, by entering a code matched to the destination.
Stranger Things	In season five of the Netflix original series, the "Upside Down" is revealed to be a wormhole that bridges together Earth and an alternate dimension known as "The Abyss", which is the home world of the monstrous entities encountered throughout the series. An identical, limited, darker copy of both Hawkins (a fictional town in Indiana) and the Abyss exist at their respective sides of the wormhole. In the earlier seasons of the show, the Upside Down was believed to be an alternate dimension that is a darker reflection of Hawkins. The wormhole is held together by an orb of "exotic matter" atop the Upside Down's copy of Hawkins National Laboratory. At the edge of the Upside Down is a flesh wall which acts as the wormhole's membrane, beyond which is empty space. The Upside Down was created in 1983, when the show's protagonist Eleven established a powerful psychic connection with a humanoid creature known as a Demogorgon in the Abyss, from a sensory deprivation tank in the Hawkins National Laboratory. Vecna, the main antagonist of the series, wanted to use the Upside Down to merge the Abyss with Earth. In the series finale, Vecna is ultimately defeated and the Upside Down is destroyed through collapsing by exploding the exotic matter at its center.

== See also ==
- Space bridge
