= Wireless: The Essential Charles Stross =

Book by Charles Stross

- First edition (UK)
- Author: Charles Stross
- Cover artist: Peter Cotton
- Language: English
- Genre: Science fiction
- Publisher: Orbit Books (UK); Ace Books (US)
- Publication date: 2009
- Publication place: United Kingdom
- Media type: Print (paperback)
- Pages: 384 pp
- ISBN: 1-84149-772-X

Wireless: The Essential Charles Stross is an English language collection of science fiction short stories by Charles Stross published by Orbit Books.

== Contents ==
- "Missile Gap" (One Million A.D., 2005, edited by Gardner Dozois, ISBN 978-0-7394-6273-7)
- "Rogue Farm" (Live Without a Net, 2003, edited by Lou Anders, ISBN 978-0-451-45945-9)
- "A Colder War" (Spectrum SF 3, 2000) available online
- "MAXOS" (Nature, 2005)
- "Down on the Farm" (Tor.com, 2008) available online
- "Unwirer" with Cory Doctorow (ReVisions, 2004 edited by Julie E. Czerneda and Isaac Szpindel, ISBN 978-0-7564-0240-2)
- "Snowball's Chance" (Nova Scotia: New Scottish Speculative Fiction, 2005, edited by Neil Williamson and Andrew J. Wilson, ISBN 978-1-84183-086-5)
- "Trunk and Disorderly" (Asimov's Science Fiction, 2007)
- "Palimpsest"; winner of the 2010 Hugo Award for Best Novella
