= NHI =

NHI may refer to:

== Health ==
- National Health Index (NHI) Number, a unique identifier used in the New Zealand health system
- National Health Insurance, or a specific national scheme:
  - National Health Insurance (British Virgin Islands)
  - National Health Insurance Scheme (Ghana)
  - National Health Insurance (Japan) 国民健康保険 (Kokumin-Kenkō-Hoken)
  - National Health Insurance Scheme (Nigeria)
  - National Health Insurance (South Africa)
  - National Health Insurance (Taiwan) 全民健康保險（chuan min chien kang pao hsien)
- National Holistic Institute, in the United States
- Nourishing Herbal Infusion

== Helicopters ==
- Nederlandse Helikopter Industrie, a Dutch manufacturer of helicopters
- NHIndustries, a manufacturer of helicopters

== Other fields ==
- National Hispanic Institute in the United States, a think-tank focused on the leadership development of young Latinos
- National Historical Institute, in the Philippines
- New Horizon Interactive, a video company, which has developed the popular Club Penguin MMOG
- Non-human intelligence, a term encompassing the intellectual abilities of anything outside of humanity
