= California Massage Therapy Council =

Organisation that oversees California's massage businesses

The California Massage Therapy Council (CAMTC) is a nonprofit organisation charged with oversight of California's massage businesses. It comprises representatives from the massage industry.

== History ==
The state of California transferred oversight of the industry To the CAMTC. Previously, regulation and oversight had come from municipal authorities. Since that change, many cities have experienced a boom in the number of massage establishments. The CAMTC has proposed legislation, in 2013, to help cities combat prostitution, which is often perceived as associated with massage studios. A proposed bill, announced April 2014, would change the body to include representatives from the League of California Cities, the California State Association of Counties, and the California Police Chiefs Association. This action would effectively return more local control to the regulation of the industry.

== CAMTC Approved Massage Schools ==
- A2Z Health.net, Inc
- Abrams College
- American Career College
- American Institute of Massage Therapy
- Bellus Academy
- Blake Austin College
- Brightwood College
- Burke Williams Academy of Massage Therapy
- California College of Physical Arts, Inc
- California Healing Arts College
- California Holistic Institute
- California Institute of Massage & Spa Services
- Calistoga Massage Therapy School
- Career Networks Institute (CNI College)
- Carrington College
- Cerritos College Community Education
- CES College
- Charter College
- Cinta Aveda
- De Anza College
- Diamond Light School of Massage and Healing Arts
- Downey Adult School
- Esalen Institute
- Five Branches University
- Fremont College
- Fullerton College
- Hands On Healing Institute
- Healing Hands School of Holistic Health
- Healing Oak School of Massage
- Holistic Life Institute
- Institute for Business and Technology
- International College of Holistic Studies
- International Professional School of Bodywork
- Kali Institute for Massage & Somatic Therapies
- Life Energy Institute
- Loving Hands Institute of Healing Arts
- Massage Center
- Massage Therapy Institute
- Mayfield College
- McKinnon Body Therapy Center
- Milan Institute
- MiraCosta College
- Monterey Institute of Touch
- Monterey Peninsula College
- National Holistic Institute
- Pacific College of Oriental Medicine
- Palace Beauty College
- Rosemead Beauty School
- Sacramento Holistic Health Academy
- San Francisco School of Massage & Bodywork
- Santa Barbara Body Therapy Institute
- School of Holistic Touch
- Sierra Massage School
- Skyline College
- Somatherapy Institute School of Massage
- South Bay Massage College
- Southern California Health Institute
- Southern California University of Health Sciences
- Victory Career College
