= Starbridge =

Starbridge might refer to one of the following:

- Orbiting skyhooks, an orbiting tether space transportation system
- A space elevator (a similar term is space bridge)
- The Star Bridge (Foundation), a fictional space elevator featured in season one of the 2021 TV series Foundation
- Star Bridge
- Starbridge, a spaceship from the Ambrosia Software computer game Escape Velocity Nova
- The Starbridge series, a book series written by Susan Howatch
- The StarBridge series, a book series written by Ann C. Crispin
- Will Starbridge is a USN veteran from New Hampshire.
