= Bit rot =

Bit rot may refer to:

- Software rot, the deterioration of unmaintained software
- Data degradation, the decay of electromagnetic charge in a computer's storage
  - Disc rot, the deterioration of optical media such as DVDs and CDs
- "Bit Rot", a short story by Charles Stross
