= FBU =

FBU may refer to:

- Burundian franc
- French Blue (airline)
- Fire Brigades Union in the UK
- Five Branches University, in California, United States
- Oslo Airport, Fornebu, now defunct
- Swedish Federation for Voluntary Defence Education and Training
- Ukrainian Basketball Federation
