= NHIS =

NHIS may refer to:

- National Health Insurance Scheme (Ghana)
- National Health Insurance Scheme (Nigeria)
- National Health Interview Survey, annual survey by the National Center for Health Statistics in the United States
- National Homelessness Information System, a system to collect and analyze data on the use of homeless shelters in Canada
- New Hampshire International Speedway, former name of the New Hampshire Motor Speedway in the United States
- Nanakuli High and Intermediate School

== See also ==
- National Health Insurance Scheme (disambiguation)
- National Health Insurance Service, the national service for healthcare in South Korea, a public health insurance program established in 2000 by the Ministry of Health and Welfare
