= Toast: And Other Rusted Futures =

2002 collection of science fiction short stories by Charles Stross

- First edition
- Author: Charles Stross
- Cover artist: Juha Lindroos
- Language: English
- Genre: Science fiction
- Publisher: Cosmos Books/Wildside Press
- Publication date: 2002
- Publication place: United Kingdom
- Media type: Print (paperback)
- Pages: 192 pp
- ISBN: 1-58715-413-7
- OCLC: 51620864

Toast: And Other Rusted Futures is an English language collection of science fiction short stories by Charles Stross, published in 2002 by Cosmos Books. Almost all of the stories in the collection were originally published between 1990 and 2000, in the SF magazines Interzone, Spectrum SF, and Odyssey.

The subtitle of the collection, as explained by Stross in his introduction, refers to the way that predictions of the future in SF stories become rapidly obsolete by the progress of actual events. For example, the 1995 story "Ship of Fools" was a prediction of disaster due to the Y2K problem, that did not come to pass.

== Contents ==
- Introduction: After the future imploded
- "Antibodies" (originally published in Interzone #157, July 2000)
- "Bear Trap" (Spectrum SF #1, January 2000)
- "A Colder War" (Spectrum SF #3, August 2000; available online at Infinity Plus)
- "Toast: A Con Report" (Interzone #134, August 1998)
- "Extracts from the Club Diary" (Odyssey #3, 1998)
- "A Boy and His God" (Odyssey #1, 1997)
- "Ship of Fools" (Interzone #98, August 1995)
- "Dechlorinating the Moderator" (Interzone #105, March 1996)
- "Yellow Snow" (Interzone #37, July 1990)
- "Big Brother Iron".
