= Neptune's Brood =

Book by Charles Stross

- First UK edition, cover
- Author: Charles Stross
- Language: English
- Genre: Science fiction, Space opera
- Publisher: Ace
- Publication date: 1 July 2013 (UK); 2 July 2013 (US)
- Media type: Print (Hardcover)
- Pages: 336
- ISBN: 978-0425256770
- Preceded by: Saturn's Children

Neptune's Brood is a science fiction novel by British author Charles Stross, set in the same universe as Saturn's Children, but thousands of years later and with all new characters.

The novel was shortlisted for the 2014 Hugo Award for Best Novel.

== Fictional universe ==
The setting of Saturn's Children is the Solar System. Homo sapiens is extinct, and all the characters are androids. In Neptune's Brood, set in AD 7000, Homo sapiens has been resurrected three times, but remains insignificant and is known as the "Fragile". In the novel, "humanity" is used for the "mechanocyte"-based metahuman successor life forms, vastly improved over the original androids.

The setting of Neptune's Brood is the part of the galaxy that has since been colonized with slower than light travel. A large part of the plot turns on the question of financing such colonization. Money is entirely cryptocurrency and is known as "bitcoin", an intentional reference by Stross to the real-life cryptocurrency. Money has been divided into three classes: "fast", "medium", "slow". Fast money is ordinary day-to-day cash, medium money is ordinary investment instruments, suitable for use within a single planetary system, and slow money is interstellar investment instruments, understood to take centuries, even millennia, to mature. Slow money transactions rely on a three-way cryptoverification scheme, and so trade at one-third the speed of light.

Two thousand years before the main plot begins, one start-up colony, Atlantis, broke contact without warning or explanation with the rest of humanity, and two attempts to physically contact them also went dark.

== Plot summary ==
The novel presents itself as an extended first-person report by Krina Alizond-114, created by the "incalculably wealthy" Sondra Alizond-1 to be a scholar of accountancy practice historiography. Her clone sister, Ana, has disappeared, and Krina is following her trail.

== Reception ==
Publishers Weekly wrote:

As always, Stross feels like the smartest guy in the room, pushing the boundaries of identity and humanity while offering up what may be the first epic tale of futuristic macroeconomics.

According to Kirkus Reviews:

If you begin by thinking that a narrative about banking, debt and accountancy might be dull, Stross will quickly disabuse you—there’s always a mad glint in his eye, even when he’s explaining some seriously weird and alluring concepts.

It was described by Saxon Bullock as follows in SFX:

The level of invention is as impressive as ever, with virtually every page crammed to bursting with incredible concepts, while the slow-burning mystery turns out to be well-crafted and gripping in the extreme.
