= Fantasticon =

Fantasticon is the national Danish science fiction convention since 2004. It has been held at various locations in Copenhagen. Fantasticon was also the name of a monthly comic book convention series that began in Michigan, USA, in 1976. The following data does not describe the USA convention series.

== Guests of Honour ==
2004: (No GoH, but guests included H. H. Løyche.)

2005: Christopher Priest, William J. Maryson (1950–2011), Imants Belogrïvs, Dave Lally, Harry Harrison.

2006: (No GoH, but guests included Lene Kaaberbøl and Josefine Ottesen)

2007: (No Fantasticon this year, GoHs at Eurocon 2007 Copenhagen: Anne McCaffrey, Stephen Baxter, Zoran Živković, David A. Hardy, Niels Dalgaard)

2008: Norman Spinrad, Erwin Neutzsky-Wulff

2009: Charles Stross, Gwyneth Jones

2010: Catherine Asaro (additional guests: Per Vadmand, Ea Philippa, Kaspar Colling Nielsen, Rikke Schubart)

2011: A. Silvestri, Henrik Harksen

2012: Alastair Reynolds, Ellen Datlow

2013: Tricia Sullivan, Karin Tidbeck

2014: Paul J. McAuley, Rochita Loenen-Ruiz

2015: Pat Cadigan, Ian Watson

2016: Justina Robson, Ken MacLeod

2017: Christopher Priest, Nina Allan

2018: Jeannette Ng, Lavie Tidhar

2019: Nisi Shawl

2020: (No GoH, virtual convention on Zoom)

2021: Laura Mauro, Anne-Marie Vedsø Olesen

2022: Priya Sharma (author), Øystein Runde, Lauren Beukes

2023: Malene Sølvsten, Tracy Fahey, Chris Beckett

2024: Catherynne M. Valente, Dominic Mitchell

2025: Aliette de Bodard, Jasper Fforde, Giuseppe Festino

2026: Sarah Pinsker, Evgenia Triantafylloy, and special guest Chris Beckett

== Dates ==
2004: 7 – 8 February

2005: 22 – 24 April

2006: 21 – 22 October

2008: 26 – 27 April

2009: 29 – 30 August

2010: 18–19 September

2011: 5 November

2012: 1–3 June

2013: 7–9 September

2014: 14–15 June

2015: 30–31 May

2016: 11–12 June

2017: 1–3 September

2018: 21–23 September

2019: 20–22 September

2020: 4–6 September

2021: 3-5 September

2022: 25-26 June

2023: 3-4 June

2024: 1-2 June

2025: 31 May - 1 June

2026: 6-7 June
