= Glasshouse (novel) =

2006 novel by Charles Stross

- First edition cover
- Author: Charles Stross
- Cover artist: Rita Frangie
- Language: English
- Genre: Science fiction
- Publisher: Orbit (UK), Ace (US)
- Publication date: June 2006
- Publication place: United Kingdom
- Media type: Print (hardback and paperback)
- Pages: 352
- ISBN: 0-441-01403-8
- OCLC: 63692719
- Dewey Decimal: 813/.6 22
- LC Class: PR6119.T79 G57 2006

Glasshouse is a science fiction novel by British author Charles Stross, first published in 2006.

In 2007, Glasshouse won the Prometheus Award, as well as being nominated for the Hugo, Campbell, and Locus Awards.

== Premise ==
The novel is set in the 27th century aboard a spacecraft adrift in interstellar space. Robin, the protagonist, has recently had his memory erased. He agrees to take part in an experiment, during which he is placed inside a model of a late 20th/early 21st century Euroamerican society. Robin is given a new identity and body, specifically that of a woman named "Reeve".

Major themes of this novel are identity, gender determinism, self-image, and conformity. Contrary to popular belief, it is not a sequel to his novel Accelerando (2005), although Stross has stated that the two novels are not obviously incompatible.

== Production ==
Stross wrote of the book's production:

Glasshouse appeared, almost fully formed, in my head between 2:30 p.m. and 3:45 p.m. in the afternoon of 23 March 2003, while I was at the pub nattering with a friend. I held it off for all of two weeks or so, until 8 April, when the compulsion to start writing became too strong to resist, and the first draft emerged in just three weeks of obsessive 12-hour days.

— Science Fiction Weekly interview with Stross, September 2003

== Plot ==
It is the 27th century, when technology has enabled humankind to inhabit the far reaches of the universe. The culture featured in the novel is based on the culture portrayed in the last chapter of Accelerando, "Survivor" (full chapter here). Humanity has spread throughout the galaxy using the wormhole technology copied from the alien routers, forming a plethora of societies and 'polities'.

Robin, a human male, is recovering from a memory excision process in a rehabilitation centre. Though he remembers nothing of his past life or lives, he suspects that he lived through traumatic times as a participant in the series of wars that raged many years before. He meets Kay, a woman, Kay, with whom he begins to form a romantic attachment. Suspecting that he has been targeted for assassination by persons unknown, he agrees to sign-up with a radical, isolated social experiment that will attempt to recreate the forgotten "Dark Ages", the late 20th and early 21st centuries.

On being transferred to the polity in which the program is being held, he discovers that he has been given the body of a woman, Reeve. As part of the experiment, he chooses a partner - Sam. As the experiment unfolds, she begins to suspect that all is not what it seems. The society seems to be incited down paths (by the experimenters) that encourage the worst of human nature to surface. Reeve has flashes of memory of Robin's past life surfacing as nightmares and flashback, showing that he was a lead member of the resistance to Curious Yellow, and that he did some pretty horrific things as a combatant. Eventually, Reeve / Robin realized that Kay and Sanni (Robin's military leader in the Curious Yellow resistance) are there close to her as other members in the society. They come to understand that the experiment is really an attempt to subvert the defenses that have been put in place to defend against viruses like Curious Yellow. Reeve / Robin and her friends form a rebellion to bring the experiment to an end, and after a bloody battle, win thir goals.

=== Explanation of the novel's title ===
In the context of the novel, "glasshouse" refers to a military prison. The polity in which the bulk of the story takes place was formerly a high-security facility for war criminals. The term was first used to describe the glass-roofed military detention barracks based in Aldershot, UK, in the mid-19th century.

Stross also refers to the Glasshouse as a type of panopticon, a prison constructed in such a way that the guards in the center can see everything the prisoners are doing, but the prisoners can never tell if the guards are watching. Philosopher Michel Foucault used the model to represent the way humans tend to conform to and internalise societal ideals based on this kind of omnipresent gaze, an idea Stross exploits in the novel.

== Background ==
=== Timekeeping ===
The polities descended from the Republic of Is do not use days, weeks, or other terrestrial dating systems other than for historical or archaeological purposes; however, the classical second has been retained as the basis of timekeeping.

Second : The time taken for light to travel 299,792,458 meters in vacuum.

Kilosecond : 16 minutes

Diurn 100 kiloseconds : 27 hours, 1 day and 3 hours

Megasecond (Cycle) 10 diurns : 11 days and 6 hours

M-year 30 megaseconds : 337 Earth days, 11 months

Gigasecond : approximately 31 Earth years

Terasecond : approximately 31,000 Earth years (half age of human species)

Petasecond : approximately 31,000,000 Earth years (half elapsed time since end of Cretaceous era)

=== Transport technology ===
T-gates : (Transporter gates). These are the ubiquitous point-to-point wormholes which link everything from polities that are light-years apart to rooms in habitats to each other. They are also used to enable one to access private storage spaces, even from clothing. Unlike the A-gates, traffic through these is instantaneous and unfiltered, though they can be fitted with firewalls at a variety of strengths.

A-gates : (Assembler gates). Nanotechnological arrays that can be used for creating all kinds of objects, goods, and substances very quickly, molecule by molecule, working from a wide series of templates. They are also used by the posthuman populace to create "backups" of themselves, redesign their physical bodies to whatever parameters they wish, long-distance travel between far-flung polities, and for medical purposes, making them, if they wish to be, virtually immortal. Military-grade versions exist which can be used to download polity-inbound traffic, analyse it for threats/contamination, reroute it to a DMZ, and then reassemble it if all is well.

Mobile Archive Suckers : Large spacecraft or mobile habitats which travel at slower-than-light speeds between the brown dwarf stars which most polities orbit. Self-contained and self-sufficient, fitted with their own A-gates, they are fuelled by plasma piped-in by T-gate from nearby stars. Generally, the ships' systems are not connected to the galactic network at large. Both crewmembers and passengers can, if they do not wish to experience the long subjective timescales of travel by this method, disassemble themselves in an A-gate and "sleep" throughout the journey.

=== Population centres ===
The vast majority of post-humanity lives in massive artificial cylindrical habitats, along with a few domed colonies on the planets, moons, and asteroids orbiting brown dwarf stars. These can be linked to each other by T-gates, creating a huge network of interconnected societies, known as the Republic of Is.

=== History ===
For a variety of reasons, post-humanity has forgotten the history of events preceding, during, and just after the singularity (the "acceleration") as it occurred back in the Solar System, from around 1950 to 2040. They refer to this period as the Dark Ages. Data-storage methods changed so rapidly that proper backups weren't made; much data was encrypted, or stored on perishable media; many individuals hailing from the period excised their memories too many times, creating a historical "bias"; and many "censorship wars" were fought, with computer viruses and worms changing or erasing what was left.

=== Censorship wars ===
A long series of these wars plagued post-humanity, starting around 300 years before the novel begins, lasting for almost a century (two centuries, according to Yourdon). Censor factions used A-gates to propagate redactive worms throughout the Republic's networks, which targeted historical data and even memories of why the wars had started in the first place. Historians and archaeologists were singled out for annihilation. These events placed a great strain on the political cohesiveness of the Republic of Is – but worse was to come.

=== Curious Yellow ===
Persons unknown created a worm of enormous destructive capability – Curious Yellow. Like previous worms it used the A-gates to spread, but it also used the people who travelled with/uploaded to them as transmission vectors. An infected A-gate would surreptitiously delete swaths of personal memory from a victim, particularly memories associated with historical knowledge of pre-Republic times. It would then force a copy of its kernel into the victim's netlink (the Cyberware which everyone uses to connect to and communicate with the gate networks) along with some bootstrap functions.

The infected victim, upon encountering a "clean" A-gate, would then feel compelled to switch the gate into debugger mode, enter a set of commands, then upload him/herself, after which the gate would execute the infected boot-loader in his/her netlink, copy it into its working set, and thus become infected in turn.

When a set amount of gates in a network became infected, they would begin communicating with each other and create privileged instruction channels which could be used by shadowy controllers with the correct authentication keys to control them remotely. They could defend themselves against attack, build and direct weapons to selected targets, and netlink to any number of T-gates.

Eventually, the republic crumbled under the pressure, converting into a series of isolated, heavily firewalled polities.

Curious Yellow is derived from a paper on worm design by Brandon Wiley: Curious Yellow: The First Coordinated Worm Design.

=== Recovery ===
However, there were those who fought back. A variety of militia groups formed, among them the Linebarger Cats, who specialised in esoteric strategies and psyops. They formed and acted on a plan to "repurpose" the worm, rewriting its code as an "immune system" and introducing it, slowly but surely, into the A-gates. Millions died as the worm fought back, but they eventually succeeded.

After Curious Yellow's destruction, a number of Quisling dictatorships formed, using hacked versions of the worm to spread in an attempt to form separatist dystopias, populated by brainwashed populations led by sinister "cognitive dictators". But these were mopped-up one-by-one, and the galaxy returned to a semblance of normality with the firewalled polities building "clean" A-gates to carefully re-integrate. The Invisible Republic became one of the largest new networks.

== Major characters in Glasshouse ==
- Robin / Reeve Brown : The main protagonist – male rehabilitation patient / "housewife" and librarian within the polity.
- Kay : Robin's girlfriend.
- Colonel-Doctor Sanni : Linebarger Cats staff-officer.
- Colonel-Professor "Bishop" Yourdon, Major-Doctor Fiore, Doctor Hanta : Founders and controllers of the Glasshouse polity.
- Sam Brown : Reeve's "husband" within the polity.
- Janis : Polity librarian; Reeve's co-worker.

== Major themes ==
The novel explores the themes of self-concept, self image, the "self", memory and the self, censorship, and historicity, as well as peer pressure, conformity, problem of other minds, redemption, gender roles, abuse of women, and the nature of fascism.

== Allusions/references to other works ==
- Cordwainer Smith, aka Paul Myron Anthony Linebarger; SF writer, political science graduate and expert in psychological warfare.
- Kill Bill movies.
- Ray Kurzweil's book The Age of Spiritual Machines.
- James Tiptree, Jr.; SF writer.
- The Prisoner; cult British TV programme.
- Leonard Cohen's song First We Take Manhattan.
- The Curious Yellow worm.
- Lewis Carroll, Jabberwocky.
- Philip Zimbardo, psychologist, creator of the Stanford prison experiment
- Stanley Milgram, social psychologist.
- Jeff Noon's book Vurt. Curious Yellow is a type of Vurt feather that traps the main character’s sister, Desdemona, setting off the quest that drives most of the book’s plot.
- John Varley, SF writer. Varley was one of the reasons the novel was written in the first place.

...Of late he's changed pace and stride, but in the 1970s he was a couple of decades ahead of the rest of the field. I was so annoyed by his latest novel, Red Thunder – it's basically a Heinleinian juvenile, a good example of the type but fundamentally less impressive than the work he's capable of – that I sat down and wrote a Varleyesque short novel myself

—Science Fiction Weekly interview with Stross, September 2003

- Basil Liddell Hart, military writer.
- Franz Kafka, In the Penal Colony.
- Adolf Hitler, the Armenian quote.

== Awards and nominations ==
- Won the 2007 Prometheus Award "for libertarian SF".
- Won the 2009 Kurd-Laßwitz-Preis
- On the final ballot for the 2007 Best Novel Hugo Award
- Nominated for the John W. Campbell Memorial Award
- Shortlisted for the Locus Award for Best Science Fiction Novel

== Release details ==
Paperback edition.

Country	Publisher	ISBN	Cover	Release date
US	Ace	ISBN 0-441-01403-8	Hardback	June 2006
UK	Orbit	ISBN 1-84149-392-9	Hardback	July 2006
UK	Orbit	ISBN 1-84149-393-7	Paperback	March 2007
US	Ace	ISBN 0-441-01508-5	Paperback	June 2007

== See also ==
- Simulated reality

== Bibliography ==
- Duchamp, L. Timmel (16 October 2006). "Glasshouse by Charles Stross". Strange Horizons. Archived from the original on 1 May 2007.
- Burnham, Karen (7 September 2006). "Glasshouse by Charles Stross". SFF World. Archived from the original on 12 September 2016..
