= A Colder War =

Novelette by Charles Stross

- Short story by Charles Stross
- Genres: Alternate history Cthulhu Mythos

Publication
- Published in: Spectrum SF No. 3
- Publication date: July 2000

"A Colder War" is an alternate history novelette by Charles Stross written c. 1997 and originally published in 2000. The story fuses the Cold War and the Cthulhu Mythos.

The story is set in the early 1980s and explores the consequences of the Pabodie expedition in H. P. Lovecraft's At the Mountains of Madness. Although the story has similarity to the later Stross novel The Atrocity Archives, they are set in different universes. Teresa Nielsen Hayden describes the story on Making Light as, "the Oliver North/Guns for Hostages scandal, seen from the viewpoint of a CIA bureaucrat, in a universe in which the entire Cthulhu Mythos is real."

It was one of Locus Online's 2000 'Recommended Reading' novelettes.

== Publication history ==
The story originally appeared in Spectrum SF No. 3 in 2000, being later reprinted in Gardner Dozois's The Year's Best Science Fiction #18 and in Stross's collections Toast: And Other Rusted Futures (in 2002) and Wireless (2009). In late 2011 it appeared in two Cthulhu-themed anthologies: The Book of Cthulhu by Night Shade Books (ISBN 1597802328) and New Cthulhu: The Recent Weird by Prime Books (ISBN 1607012898).

== Plot synopsis ==
The main viewpoint character, Roger Jourgensen, is a CIA analyst who writes up a report on the state of both the U.S. and Soviet governments' occult research for incoming President Ronald Reagan. This report attracts the attention of "the Colonel" (later named as "Colonel North"; implied to be Oliver North), who arranges for Jourgensen's transfer and for him to work on a variant of the Iran–Contra affair: secret dealings between the U.S. and Iran to counter Saddam Hussein's Iraq, frustrate the Soviet intervention in Afghanistan, as well as arrange the freeing of hostages in Lebanon.

In this Cold War, the U.S. and NATO lag behind the Soviets in mastery of the dark arts, and rely on nuclear weapons as their main countermeasure. The Soviets gained their knowledge from Nazi Germany, which had moved a sleeping entity from an underwater city in the Baltic Sea; the entity is now contained at Chernobyl. They have also deployed "servitors", unstoppable robot-like beings found in the original Pabodie expedition. Satellite reconnaissance by the U.S. shows that the servitors may have been deployed in Afghanistan, which would violate a secret multinational treaty prohibiting the use of these alien entities in war to which even Adolf Hitler adhered. U.S. countermeasures include 300 megatons of nuclear weapons and a continuity of government base hundreds of light years from Earth, connected via a gate in Washington. The CIA also uses these gates to other planets as roundabout ways to transport drugs and arms to and from the Afghan mujahideen as part of Operation Cyclone.

Stephen Jay Gould briefs the CIA on the evolutionary implications of the alien lifeforms, confirming they come from no Earthly source. Other nations emulate the superpowers; Iran and Israel covertly plan a joint nuclear defence against Iraq's attempts to open a gate to the stars. Eventually, the Colonel's dealings are leaked, and Jourgensen has to testify before a congressional committee. One congressman, horrified by the accounts of the Colonel's dabbling, inquires about the Great Filter: why no aliens have openly stopped by to visit humanity, and only relics and servants remain. He points out that meddling with relics of the Elder Ones would be a good explanation for why other intelligent life has been exterminated before it could visit.

While the committee is in session, Saddam manages to stabilise the gate of Yog-Sothoth, destroying opposing tribes in Iraq and causing Iran to retaliate with a nuclear attack. The timing unfortunately lines up with a joke by President Reagan; the Soviets and their leader Yegor Ligachev retaliate, with a nuclear war destroying the Middle East and much of the U.S. and Soviet Union. More worryingly, the entity behind the Soviet program, Cthulhu, has somehow been loosed; the U.S. nuclear strike does not appear to slow it down as it heads west across the Atlantic Ocean. Jourgensen and other U.S. personnel retreat to a hidden constructed colony on a distant dying planet, codenamed XK-Masada. There, riven by phantom voices, Jourgensen contemplates suicide. He decides against it, as death would be no escape if – as he suspects – he has already been devoured by Yog-Sothoth, and his current existence is only part of a simulation.
