= Rogue Farm =

2003 science fiction short story by Charles Stross

Rogue Farm is a 2003 science fiction short story by British author Charles Stross. It takes place in a bizarre future sometime after the technological singularity. In a world of biological fabricators, eight-legged cows, talking dogs, microscopic surveillance bots, and mid-life genetic upgrades, the main character, Joe, and his wife Maddie must defend their small farm from a terrifying threat.

== Plot ==
Joe and Maddie are squatting in a farmstead. One morning, they must drive off a "farm", a grotesque creature that was once human. This creature pleads with them, saying it is selling brains to prepare for its trip to Jupiter. While the farm leaves their property, it puts down tap roots in a nearby clump of trees just outside their property. It is clear that the farm plans to use this spot as a launch point; these farms use specialized enzymes to turn the sap of tall trees into explosives, which will destroy every living thing near the launch site.

Joe goes off to a nearby bar and speaks to a pair of locals who also had a problem with a creature like this: Arthur and Wendy-the-Rat. Joe speaks with Wendy, who discreetly informs him (no small feat, given the tiny surveillance robots that spy on the citizens so that the police can prevent crime before it happens) that killing the creature will be necessary. Returning home he shares a smoke with his semi-sentient dog, Bob, as he contemplates what to do next. Because Maddie has become forlorn and uncommunicative, he tells his dog to clean out the bio fabricator and prepare the backup tapes to re-create his wife if necessary.

During the next few days, Joe builds his arsenal from the tool shed. Preparing his weapons for what's to come, he becomes increasingly concerned about his wife's state of mind, but is too busy to do anything about it. He goes off grid to hide his crime. In the showdown between the monster and Joe, he has armed himself with liquid nitrogen and an extremely powerful tranquilizer dart. He destroys the trees and uses the dart to neutralize the monster. However, just as the creature lies dying, Joe finds that Maddie has joined the farm. In killing the creature, he has killed his own wife. He calls up Bob to start the process of creating a backup for Maddie, again.

== Adaptations ==
Scottish Television produced a Manga-influenced animated short film (script and direction by Mark Bender and Gary J. Marshall) in 2004.
