= Nova Scotia: New Scottish Speculative Fiction =

2005 anthology compiled by Neil Williamson and Andrew J. Wilson

- Author: Edited by Andrew J. Wilson and Neil Williamson
- Language: English
- Genre: Science fiction and fantasy anthology
- Publisher: Mercat Press
- Publication date: 2005
- Publication place: United Kingdom
- Media type: Print (paperback)
- Pages: 287 pp
- ISBN: 1-84183-086-0
- OCLC: 62531788
- Dewey Decimal: 823.9140809411 22
- LC Class: PR8676.5.S33 N68 2005

Nova Scotia: New Scottish Speculative Fiction (ISBN 1-84-183086-0) is an anthology showcasing Scottish science fiction and fantasy, compiled by Neil Williamson and Andrew J. Wilson. The book was among the finalists for the 2006 World Fantasy Award for Best Anthology.

== Stories ==
1. The Cost of Pearls by Edwin Morgan
2. A Case of Consilience by Ken MacLeod
3. Deus ex Homine by Hannu Rajaniemi
4. Not Wisely But Too Well by A.J. McIntosh
5. Third-Degree Burns by Andrew J. Wilson
6. Lest We Forget by Marion Arnott
7. The Intrigue of the Battered Box by Michael Cobley
8. Five Fantastic Fictions by Ron Butlin
9. Running on at Adventures by Angus McAllister
10. A Knot of Toads by Jane Yolen
11. Sophie and the Sacred Fluid by Andrew C. Ferguson
12. Vanilla for the Lady by Deborah J. Miller
13. Pisces Ya Bas by Gavin Inglis
14. The Vulture, 4 - 17 March by Harvey Welles and Philip Raines
15. The Bogle's Bargain by Stefan Pearson
16. Criggie by Matthew Fitt
17. Snowball's Chance by Charles Stross
18. Total Mental Quality, by the Way by William Meikle
19. The Bennie and the Bonobo by Neil Williamson
20. The Hard Stuff by John Grant
21. Dusk by Jack Deighton
