= Rule 34 (novel) =

2011 science fiction novel by Charles Stross

- Front cover 1st edition (hardcover, US), 2011
- Author: Charles Stross
- Cover artist: Alberto Seveso
- Language: English
- Series: Halting State series
- Genre: science fiction
- Publisher: Ace (US) / Orbit (UK)
- Publication date: July 2011
- Publication place: US/UK
- Pages: 368
- ISBN: 978-0-441-02034-8
- Preceded by: Halting State
- Followed by: The Lambda Functionary (cancelled)

Rule 34 is a near-future science fiction novel by Charles Stross. It is a loose sequel to Halting State and was published on 5 July 2011 in the US and 7 July 2011 in the UK. The title is a reference to the Internet meme Rule 34, which states that "If it exists, there is porn of it. No exceptions." Rule 34 was nominated for the 2012 Arthur C. Clarke Award and the 2012 Locus Award for Best Science Fiction Novel.

== Plot summary ==
The novel is told in second-person narrative but primarily from three points of view: Inspector Kavanaugh of the Edinburgh police investigates spammers murdered in gruesome and inventive ways and learns about similar cases in other parts of Europe; Anwar, a former identity thief who becomes Scottish honorary consul for a fictional state in Central Asia; and "The Toymaker", an enforcer and organizer for the criminal "Operation". Their interactions and conflicts drive the story.

== Critical reception ==
Reviews have been favorable, with Cory Doctorow calling the novel, "savvy, funny, viciously inventive". Kirkus Reviews gives it a star, saying, "Dazzling, chilling and brilliant". Publishers Weekly calls "the whole more than the sum of its parts". There was a generally positive review in The Guardian.

== Sequel cancellation ==
Following the revelations by Edward Snowden, Stross announced that there would be no third book in the planned trilogy. "Halting State wasn't intended to be predictive when I started writing it in 2006. Trouble is, about the only parts that haven't happened yet are Scottish Independence and the use of actual quantum computers for cracking public key encryption (and there's a big fat question mark over the latter—what else are the NSA up to?)."
