= Halting State =

2007 novel by Charles Stross

- First edition (US)
- Author: Charles Stross
- Language: English
- Genre: Science fiction
- Publisher: Orbit (UK), Ace (US)
- Publication date: 2 October 2007
- Publication place: United Kingdom & United States
- Media type: Print (hardcover)
- Pages: 368
- ISBN: 0-441-01498-4
- OCLC: 123232449
- Dewey Decimal: 823/.92 22
- LC Class: PR6119.T79 H36 2007
- Followed by: Rule 34

Halting State is a novel by Charles Stross, published in the United States on 2 October 2007 and in the United Kingdom in January 2008. Stross has said that it is "a thriller set in the software houses that write multiplayer games". The plot centres on a bank robbery in a virtual world. It features speculative technologies, including Specs and virtual server networks over mobile phones. The book is on its second printing in the United States. The novel was nominated for both the Hugo and Locus Awards in 2008.

The main story is split between three main protagonists, Sue, Elaine, and Jack, whose sections are always in the second person, with italicised thoughts in first person during each character's respective chapter. Each chapter is followed in sequential trilogies (Sue, Elaine, Jack) for the duration of the novel. This pattern excepts only the prologue and epilogue of the novel, which both contain faux email to supporting characters.

A sequel to Halting State entitled Rule 34 (previously '419') was released in mid-2011.

== Plot summary ==
The plot opens with a faux email addressed to Nigel MacDonald, listing a job offer. It is later learned that this email is for a work-at-home programmer position at Hayek Associates PLC.

It is then learned that a cybercrime has been committed in the massively multiplayer online role-playing game (MMORPG) Avalon Four. A robbery of several thousand euros worth of "prestige items" occurs in the game's central bank, led by a band of orcs and a "dragon for fire support." It is later noticed that this seemingly simple incident has deep implications – both financial (Hayek stock price) and logistical (compromised cryptographic keys), which sets the stage for the latter half of the novel.

The main story is then divided between police chapters as Sue, investigation sections as Elaine, and programmer and gamer geek sections as Jack. Initially separate storylines, the three inevitably join forces to combat a much larger conspiracy that hinges on international espionage and counterterrorism. These initial segments track the bank robbery and mystery man, Nigel MacDonald, who is revealed as a shadow identity created from Jack Reed's credentials as a programmer and gamer.

Eventually, it is discovered that the entirety of the European network backbone—including its root keyservers—has been compromised by Chinese hackers. It is more or less at this point that the wool is removed from the reader's eyes that "it's no longer a game," while Jack and Elaine develop a romance between action segments.

Using the game Spooks as a sock puppet for real espionage missions, Jack and Elaine are sent to uncover the identity of a mole inside Hayek Associates, which is subsequently revealed to be a front for the government. The mole is said to have leaked cryptographic keys to "Team Red", or Chinese interests, through a blacknet. For contrast, the European protagonists are called simply, "Team Blue".

It is at this point that the stage is set for the final confrontation. Using Nigel's shadow identity as bait for Team Red's mole, Elaine and Jack successfully expose and capture Marcus Hackman, who is revealed to be the mole and main antagonist. It is then revealed that Hackman had staged the whole thing to use strategic put options to earn €26 million when his own company, Hayek Associates, took the fall for the initial robbery sequence.

Jack is shot twice in the chest during this exchange, but is seen recovering in a hospital bed by the end of the book.

The novel closes with an email addressed to Hackman that resembles a 419 scam from a Nigerian banker, implying that is where he hid the money.

== Protagonists ==
- Sue Smith, Edinburgh Detective Sergeant
- Elaine Barnaby, insurance fraud investigator for Dietrich-Brunner Associates
- Jack Reed, recently laid-off programmer and expert on MMORPGs

== Reception ==
Halting State was nominated for both the Hugo and Locus Awards in 2008, and The Guardian called it a "tight, well-observed thriller", but found the second-person narrative distancing.
