= National Health Insurance Scheme =

National Health Insurance Scheme refers to a health insurance program set up by the National government.

== Existing schemes ==
- National Health Insurance Scheme (Ghana)
- National Health Insurance Scheme (Nigeria)
- National Health Insurance (Japan)
- Rashtriya Swasthya Bima Yojana (India)
- National health insurance#Programs Additional schemes

== See also ==
- NHIS (disambiguation)
- National Health Insurance
