= The Laundry Files =

Series of novels by Charles Stross

The Laundry Files (inc. Tales of the New Management)
- A collection of the first stories in the series (2004)
- Novels: The Atrocity Archives (2004); The Jennifer Morgue (2006); The Fuller Memorandum (2010); The Apocalypse Codex (2012); The Rhesus Chart (2014); The Annihilation Score (2015); The Nightmare Stacks (2016); The Delirium Brief (2017); The Labyrinth Index (2018); Dead Lies Dreaming (2020); Quantum of Nightmares (2022); Escape from Yokai Land (2022); Season of Skulls (2023); A Conventional Boy (2025); The Regicide Report (2026); Novellas (various)
- Author: Charles Stross
- Country: United Kingdom
- Language: English
- Genre: see article
- Publisher: various
- Published: 28 May 2004 – present (first short story 2002)
- Media type: Print (hardback & paperback); Audiobook; E-book

The Laundry Files is a series of novels by British writer Charles Stross. They mix the genres of Lovecraftian horror, spy thriller, science fiction, and workplace humour. Their main character for the first five novels is "Bob Howard" (a pseudonym taken for security purposes), a one-time I.T. consultant turned occult field agent. Howard is recruited to work for the Q-Division of SOE, otherwise known as "the Laundry", the British government agency which deals with occult threats. "Magic" is described as being a branch of applied computation (mathematics), therefore computers and equations are just as useful as, and perhaps more potent than, classical spellbooks, pentagrams, and sigils for the purpose of influencing ancient powers and opening gates to other dimensions. These occult struggles happen largely out of view of the public, as the Laundry seeks to keep the methods for contacting such powers under wraps. There are also elements of dry humour and satirisation of bureaucracy.

While the stories are partially inspired by the Cthulhu Mythos universe created by H. P. Lovecraft and others, they are not set in Lovecraft's universe. In Stross's world, the greatest magicians are the scientists who closely study the phenomena; it features a secret history of historical thinkers who also dabbled in or stumbled upon occult uses of their work.

The Concrete Jungle and Equoid both won the Hugo Award for Best Novella, and "Overtime" was a nominee for best novelette. The series as a whole was nominated for the Hugo Award for Best Series in 2019 and 2024.

== The Atrocity Archives ==
The Atrocity Archives
- Author: Charles Stross
- Cover artist: Steve Montiglio
- Language: English
- Genre: Science fiction / Lovecraftian horror
- Set in: 2001
- Publisher: Golden Gryphon Press
- Publication date: 28 May 2004
- Publication place: United Kingdom
- Media type: Print (hardcover)
- Pages: 295
- ISBN: 1-930846-25-8
- OCLC: 53276312
- Followed by: The Jennifer Morgue

The Atrocity Archives is the first collection of Laundry stories by British author Charles Stross. It is set in 2002–03 and was published in 2004. It includes the short novel The Atrocity Archive (originally serialised in Spectrum SF, #7 November 2001) and The Concrete Jungle, which won the 2005 Hugo Award for Best Novella.

The protagonist of both stories is computer expert Bob Howard, who re-discovers certain mathematical equations that contact other worlds. The Laundry detects the disturbance and swoops in to give him a mandatory job offer ("I thought I was just generating weird new fractals; they knew I was dangerously close to landscaping Wolverhampton with alien nightmares"). From his position in the Laundry, a secret British occult intelligence organisation, Howard is allowed to learn something of the secret history of the world, as well as the various modern counter-measures the Laundry has adopted to deal with these threats. Despite the nature of the work, the Laundry is an efficient and low-key modern organization; more cubicle-jockeying than stately mansion towers and hidden volcano lairs, in other words. A tag-line used for the books by publisher Ace Books was "Saving the world is Bob Howard's job. There are a surprising number of meetings involved."

In The Atrocity Archive, Howard is given work as a field agent in finding and protecting Irish Professor of Logic Dominique "Mo" O'Brien, as her work – dangerously close to the point of bending reality – has triggered the Laundry's person-of-interest checks. There, Howard must contend with the Black Chamber, which in this setting was never actually disbanded, but merely went underground as the US government's equivalent of the Laundry. Howard and Mo eventually head to Amsterdam and deal with Middle Eastern terrorists also on the hunt for Mo's work. They also research the Atrocity Archive, a classified record of German efforts in World War II. In this universe, the Thule Society, a pagan and occult group formed during the defeat of Germany in World War I, actually achieved results; they were absorbed by the Ahnenerbe, which became the occult branch of the SS, and who used German mathematician David Hilbert's research (unwillingly) to attempt to gain an edge for the Nazis. The Wannsee Conference was thus an attempt to harness the occult via mass human sacrifice in the Holocaust, but it ultimately failed after Allied interference. Mo is captured by the terrorists and sent via wormhole to an alternate universe where the Nazis did succeed – although not in a manner they would have preferred. In this alternate universe, the Nazis summoned a frost giant out of Germanic/Norse legend, which was actually an elder being that fed on heat and who proceeded to destroy Earth. Bob and a team of SAS agents open their own gate, infiltrate the frozen universe, rescue Mo, and leave a nuclear bomb to 'sanitise' the scene. Bob belatedly realises that the nuclear bomb is a counterproductive trap; the frost giant intends to use its power to propel it into their reality, which has far more heat to eat. Bob manages to stop the device from exploding before escaping back to his original universe.

In The Concrete Jungle, Bob Howard is called in for an emergency: there are too many Concrete Cows in Milton Keynes. Howard reads classified files on the presumed cause: gorgonism, which has been banned by treaty for military use, and has been researched by various scientists over time – Lavoisier, Geiger, and Rutherford. Alarmingly, the government has built a network to artificially emulate gorgons in FPGAs, then planned a network of cameras that could be hooked into this emulation – the CCTV network of anti-crime cameras deployed across Britain in the late 90s and early 2000s. This network was intended as a defense if the Old Ones were to rise and attack; however, someone has subverted a CCTV camera to stone a cow, then deposited it with the other concrete cows. As unauthorised use of the CCTV-basilisk network could hold the entire nation at hostage, this is an incredible risk. In an unrelated event, Howard is informed that he is being negligent about preparing for a meeting about a Business Software Alliance audit for the Laundry's software; Howard strongly opposes the audit, as the BSA invariably installs "spyware" to snoop for unauthorised installations.

Howard, with the assistance of Detective Inspector Josephine Sullivan of Milton Keynes, investigates the incident, which soon expands to the murder of humans as well as cows. They attempt to track who could possibly have had access to the gorgon-emulation software and installed it. Meanwhile, a ransom note is received demanding the software be uninstalled. Their investigation eventually leads them to the developers of the software, who are mostly dead from their own cameras, and an agent named "McLuhan" ("the medium is the message"). Howard discovers that the whole incident was inter-department wrangling gone wrong; a rival manager had been seeking to show that Angleton (Howard's manager) was incompetent and letting his own secret programs leak, and her minions had covered their tracks more bloodily than necessary. The "BSA audit" had been an excuse to install the gorgon-software into the Laundry's own internal cameras while Angleton was distracted. Howard and Sullivan infiltrate the Laundry to pull its Internet connection, while Angleton attends the meeting where he might be deposed. Howard comes upstairs to find Angleton victorious; it seems that his rival did not understand who Angleton truly reported to in the matrix management of the Laundry before launching her attempt to have him dismissed. His position as head of Counter-Possession Unit was actually secondary to his position as Private Secretary, and that position's manager went all the way to the top.

Publishers Weekly was somewhat mixed in their review saying that "though the characters all tend to sound the same, and Stross resorts to lengthy summary explanations to dispel confusion, the world he creates is wonderful fun". The Washington Post called it "a bizarre yet effective yoking of the spy and horror genres".

Stross states that his inspiration for the spy in these novels is closer to the out-of-place bureaucrats of Len Deighton than to the James Bond model. He also mentions that when he began writing the series in 1999, he chose as villains "an obscure but fanatical and unpleasant gang who might, conceivably, be planning an atrocity on American soil"; but that by the time the novel was to be published in late 2001, Al-Qaeda was no longer obscure, so he chose a different group to use in the novella.

In the afterword to the Science Fiction Book Club 2-in-1 edition of The Atrocity Archives and The Jennifer Morgue, Stross notes that friends warned him against reading the novel Declare while he was working on The Atrocity Archives due to the strong parallels between the two works. Stross also mentioned the similarities between the novel and the Delta Green role-playing game, similarities referenced in the short story "Pimpf" included with The Jennifer Morgue; Delta Green is also about elite government conspiracies working against villains who attempt to wield power derived from the Mythos, as well as rival conspiracies.

== The Jennifer Morgue ==
The Jennifer Morgue
- Author: Charles Stross
- Cover artist: Steve Montiglio
- Language: English
- Genre: Science fiction
- Set in: 2005
- Publisher: Golden Gryphon Press
- Publication date: November 2006
- Publication place: United Kingdom
- Pages: 340
- ISBN: 1-930846-45-2
- OCLC: 67239775
- Dewey Decimal: 813/.6 22
- LC Class: PR6119.T79 J46 2006
- Preceded by: The Atrocity Archives
- Followed by: The Fuller Memorandum

The Jennifer Morgue is the second collection of Laundry stories by British author Charles Stross. It is set in 2005 and was published in 2006. It contains the title novel The Jennifer Morgue, the short story "Pimpf", and an essay titled "The Golden Age of Spying". The collection is a sequel to the stories published in The Atrocity Archives. Eccentric billionaire Ellis Billington, the antagonist of the book, intends to use the Glomar Explorer recovery ship to raise the Jennifer Morgue, an ancient remnant of an era before humans sitting on the ocean floor. Billington seems to believe this will give him cosmic power, although the British government fears that this act will break the Benthic Treaty with the Deep Ones, which would be exceptionally unwise. Billington and his associates also pursue techno-occult corporate plots, with him running a software company that tries to mind-control buying agents into locked-in contracts, and his wife Eileen involved in a multi-level marketing cosmetics corporation with mysterious age-defying properties. Bob Howard is paired up with glamorous agent Ramona Random of the Black Chamber (the American equivalent of the Laundry), and the two are sent out on a globe-trotting mission to foil Billington. Bob's girlfriend from the first book, "Mo" O'Brien, becomes entangled with the operation as well.

Where 2004's The Atrocity Archives is written in the idiom of Len Deighton, The Jennifer Morgue is a pastiche of Ian Fleming's James Bond novels. In-setting, the James Bond novels and films exist, allowing the characters to note the eerie and intentional resemblances afoot. The villain has set up a localized occult field that essentially makes it so that a Bond archetype has the best odds of defeating him and reality bends in Bond-film-like ways nearby, albeit with his own plan for escaping the inevitable doom of a Bond villain. Much of the Mythos relating to Deep Ones and Deep One-human hybrids originates from The Shadow over Innsmouth. The plotline with the Glomar Explorer refers to the real-life Project Azorian, named by the press as Project Jennifer, a 1975 CIA plan to raise a Soviet submarines which used billionaire Howard Hughes' eccentricity as a cover for why a recovery ship was performing operations in an area.

The Jennifer Morgue was nominated for the Locus Award for Best Fantasy Novel in 2007. One 2007 review called the book "rip-roaringly entertaining", and admired how the book mixed humor with gravitas (the characters treat Bond as a joke, but the threat of horrific undersea monsters with sincerity).

== The Fuller Memorandum ==
The Fuller Memorandum
- Author: Charles Stross
- Language: English
- Genre: Science fiction
- Set in: 2008
- Publisher: Ace
- Publication date: July 2010
- Publication place: United Kingdom
- Media type: Print (hardcover)
- Pages: 312
- ISBN: 0-441-01867-X
- Preceded by: The Jennifer Morgue
- Followed by: The Apocalypse Codex

The Fuller Memorandum is the third novel in the Laundry series of novels. It is set in 2008 and was published in 2010. As in the previous novels, the protagonist is Bob Howard, an agent for the intelligence agency known as the Laundry.

Where The Atrocity Archives was written in the idiom of Len Deighton and The Jennifer Morgue was a pastiche of Ian Fleming's James Bond novels, The Fuller Memorandum is a homage of sorts to Anthony Price's Dr David Audley/Colonel Jack Butler series of spy thrillers, and features two minor characters named Roskill and Panin, names which appeared as recurring characters in Price's series. The title is derived from General J. F. C. Fuller, military theorist, right-wing intellectual occultist, and an associate of Aleister Crowley, and also a reference to the film The Quiller Memorandum (Stross has noted that his original intention was to pastiche Adam Hall's Quiller novels, but that he changed the plan part way through the writing).

The plot of the book revolves around an eponymous document which describes a supernatural entity, the Eater of Souls. The document and Howard's boss James Angleton go missing, and Howard must locate them. Angleton turns out to be involved in a struggle with cultist double agents inside the Laundry loyal to Nyarlathotep, who capture Howard and plan to bind the Eater of Souls into Howard's body in order to advance their goals. This fails because the Eater of Souls was already bound into Angleton's body decades ago by the predecessors of the Laundry; it has "gone native", aligning itself with the Laundry's goals and British values. Howard uses magic to raise the dead, using them to overcome the cultists.

== The Apocalypse Codex ==
The Apocalypse Codex
- Author: Charles Stross
- Language: English
- Genre: Science fiction
- Set in: 2010
- Publisher: Ace
- Publication date: July 2012
- Publication place: United Kingdom
- Media type: Print (hardcover)
- Pages: 336
- Award: Locus Award for Best Fantasy Novel (2013)
- ISBN: 978-1-937007-46-1
- Preceded by: The Fuller Memorandum
- Followed by: The Rhesus Chart

The Apocalypse Codex is the fourth novel in the Laundry series. It is set in 2010 and was published in 2012. In this novel, the protagonist Bob Howard, an agent for the intelligence agency known as the Laundry, is tasked with investigating American televangelist Raymond Schiller, who seeks to gain influence in Britain. Bob finds out that Schiller, who preaches a quiverfull prosperity gospel, is serving a supremely dangerous supernatural entity and trying to bring about the end of the world. The book introduces new allies for Bob: Persephone Hazard, a freelancing witch and secret agent, and Peter Wilson, a vicar and expert in biblical apocrypha.

According to Stross, while the first three books in the series were written in the style of Len Deighton, Ian Fleming and Anthony Price, respectively, the fourth installment is written in the style of a Peter O'Donnell (Modesty Blaise) novel. For future installments, Stross feels that "the series has acquired an identity and feel of its own", and does not intend to continue the pastiche motif.

== The Rhesus Chart ==
The Rhesus Chart
- Author: Charles Stross
- Language: English
- Series: Laundry Files
- Genre: Science fiction
- Set in: spring 2013
- Publisher: Ace
- Publication date: July 2014
- Publication place: United Kingdom
- Media type: Print (hardcover)
- Pages: 368
- ISBN: 978-0-425-25686-2
- Preceded by: The Apocalypse Codex
- Followed by: The Annihilation Score

The Rhesus Chart is the fifth novel in the Laundry series. It is set in spring 2013 and was published in 2014. The novels follow the protagonist Bob Howard, an agent for the intelligence agency known as the Laundry.

The Rhesus Chart plot describes an investigation into what appears to be vampire activity, despite the fact that people are almost suspiciously resistant to the idea that vampires could exist or be involved, which complicates the investigation. It transpires that elder vampires have been subtly mind controlling Laundry staff to convince them that vampires do not exist. A group of recently created vampires join the Laundry, and the two elder vampires in the book are destroyed, at the cost of the life of James Angleton, Howard's boss.

The Rhesus Chart received a Kirkus Reviews starred review and was also reviewed in Asimov's Science Fiction.

== The Annihilation Score ==
The Annihilation Score
- Author: Charles Stross
- Language: English
- Series: Laundry Files
- Genre: Science fiction
- Set in: summer/autumn 2013
- Publisher: Ace
- Publication date: July 2015
- Publication place: United Kingdom
- Media type: Print (hardcover)
- Pages: 416
- ISBN: 978-0-425-28117-8
- Preceded by: The Rhesus Chart
- Followed by: The Nightmare Stacks

The Annihilation Score is the sixth novel in the Laundry series. It is set in summer/autumn 2013 and was published in 2015. The protagonist is Dr. Dominique "Mo" O'Brien, the wife of Bob Howard, the protagonist of previous books in the series and also an agent for the intelligence agency known as the Laundry.

As the world lurches toward the potentially apocalyptic forces that will probably bring about CASE NIGHTMARE GREEN (the Laundry's codeword for an inevitable worldwide awakening of Lovecraftian horrors, "the stars coming right"), regular humans have started developing superpowers. Mo is promoted to management, tasked to create an inter-agency department to coordinate between The Laundry and the police; two of the Laundry personnel assigned to her team are Ramona (from The Jennifer Morgue) and Mhari (The Rhesus Chart), women who have history with her estranged husband Bob Howard. She is also the holder of the powerful magical Erich Zahn bone violin that she calls Lecter. Lecter is increasingly asserting its power, including induced dreams that relate to The King in Yellow. She is unwillingly compelled to act in a police plot to control the minds of the British public in the interests of law and order, which it becomes clear will backfire, releasing the King in Yellow; she overcomes it with the help of her staff, destroying Lecter in the process.

== The Nightmare Stacks ==
The Nightmare Stacks
- Author: Charles Stross
- Language: English
- Series: Laundry Files
- Genre: Science fiction
- Set in: March-April 2014
- Publisher: Orbit
- Publication date: June 2016
- Publication place: United Kingdom
- Media type: Print (hardcover)
- Pages: 400
- ISBN: 978-0-356-50534-3
- Preceded by: The Annihilation Score
- Followed by: The Delirium Brief

The Nightmare Stacks is the seventh novel in the Laundry Files series. It is set in March–April 2014 and was published in 2016. The protagonist is Alex Schwartz, a vampire (or PHANG in Laundry terminology) working for the Laundry, who was introduced in The Rhesus Chart.

On a parallel-universe Earth, a species called Elves or alfar have evolved to be expert magic users. They have visited Earth in the past, from which comes a great deal of folklore. Civil war has left the Elves' home world uninhabitable and they plan to magically invade the Earth and make it their new home. To scout ahead, they send Agent First of Spies and Liars, the eldest living daughter of the Elven King, who takes over the human identity of a student named Cassie. Agent First enters a relationship with Laundry member and PHANG Alex Schwartz, intending to sacrifice him to infiltrate and defeat the Laundry from within. Unbeknownst to her, Alex was himself an unwitting honeytrap set by the Laundry, and their meeting leads to Cassie throwing in her lot with the human race. The Elves invade Leeds and threaten the British heartland with their powerful magic, but they are not immune to human weapons and are defeated in a fashion which leaves Cassie inheriting the absolute rulership of the elves present. Cassie immediately surrenders to Alex, declares the Elves to be refugees who cannot go home for fear of their lives, and requests asylum under the Immigration, Asylum and Nationality Act 2006.

== The Delirium Brief ==
The Delirium Brief
- Author: Charles Stross
- Language: English
- Series: Laundry Files
- Genre: Science fiction
- Set in: May-June 2014
- Publisher: Orbit
- Publication date: 2017
- Publication place: United Kingdom
- Media type: Print (hardcover)
- Pages: 384
- ISBN: 978-0765394668
- Preceded by: The Nightmare Stacks
- Followed by: The Labyrinth Index

The Delirium Brief is the eighth book in the Laundry Files series. It is set in May–June 2014 and was released in July 2017. The Delirium Brief is set about a month after The Nightmare Stacks. Unlike Books 6 and 7, the narrative viewpoint shifts back to Bob Howard. After the invasion of the Elves in which thousands of people perished, the existence of the Laundry has become public knowledge, and the agency faces a new threat, this time not supernatural but political; the Prime Minister uses the Laundry as a scapegoat and dissolves it, to be replaced with a public–private partnership. The mastermind behind this plan turns out to be an old antagonist from The Apocalypse Codex, Raymond Schiller, still trying to bring about the end of the world. The rump of the Laundry executes a coup in cooperation with the surviving cultists from The Fuller Memorandum, bringing Britain under the rule of Nyarlathotep as a lesser evil.

The Delirium Brief is published by Tor. According to Stross, the book was somewhat delayed due to the Brexit referendum, as the pro-Brexit result required a large rewrite to reconcile the politics portrayed in the book with the real-world developments.

== The Labyrinth Index ==
The Labyrinth Index
- Author: Charles Stross
- Language: English
- Series: Laundry Files
- Genre: Science fiction
- Set in: winter 2014/early 2015
- Publisher: Tor
- Publication date: 2018
- Publication place: United Kingdom
- Media type: Print (hardcover)
- Pages: 368
- ISBN: 978-1250196088
- Preceded by: The Delirium Brief

The Labyrinth Index is the ninth book in the Laundry Files series. It is set in Winter 2014/early 2015 and was released in October 2018. Mhari Murphy is the protagonist. She has been elevated to the House of Lords (taking the title "Baroness Karnstein") and serves under the new Prime Minister following the Laundry-engineered overthrow of the Government described in the previous book. The new Prime Minister Fabian Everyman (an alias of Nyarlathotep) sends Mhari to the United States on a mission to discover what has happened to the now-missing President and who is running America in his stead.

There she finds that the Black Chamber has made the citizenry forget the very existence of the President and have taken over the US Government. The Black Chamber's plan, echoing the Laundry's UK plan in the previous book, is to install a Lovecraftian entity (Cthulhu in this case) as the head of the US Executive and thus survive and fight the crisis caused by CASE NIGHTMARE GREEN, which is well underway at this point.

Mhari and her team try to evade the deputy director (nicknamed DeeDee) and her agents, and despite fatalities manage to free the President to broadcast a reminder of his existence to the populace. Mhari and the survivors of her team then return to the UK, leaving the President behind as he struggles, and eventually fails, to reassert his authority. But the struggle occupies US forces and so buys time for the United Kingdom, which was of course the Prime Minister's plan in the first place. Mhari keeps her job and is congratulated, and the novel ends with her contemplating her future with her fiancé in the new nightmarish world unfolding before them.

== Dead Lies Dreaming ==
Dead Lies Dreaming
- Author: Charles Stross
- Language: English
- Series: Laundry Files
- Genre: Science fiction
- Set in: December 2016
- Publisher: Tor
- Publication date: 2020
- Publication place: United Kingdom
- Media type: Print (hardcover)
- Pages: 384
- ISBN: 978-1250267023
- Preceded by: The Labyrinth Index
- Followed by: Quantum of Nightmares

Dead Lies Dreaming was marketed as the tenth book in the Laundry Files series but does not concern itself with the titular agency or its members apart from an occasional cameo. More accurately, it is the start of a separate trilogy set in the same world the author refers to as "Tales of the New Management". It is set in December 2016 and was released in October 2020. This novel is clearly based on the story of Peter Pan, and suggests that the author is back in a pastiche role again.

The "Tales of the New Management" series jumps forward in time to depict the events under Prime Minister Fabian Everyman (an alias of the Elder God Nyarlathotep). Instead of The Laundry, the series explores the civilian side of this new United Kingdom, controlled by magic and superpowers. “Dead Lies Dreaming” features corrupt plutocrat Rupert Bigge and his executive assistant Evelyn Starkey. Rupert is covertly the high priest of another Elder God and is hunting for a magical book that gives its owner occult power. Evelyn is ordered to get it for him by any means necessary. To this end, she recruits her younger brother Imp and his street gang made up of Game Boy, Doc Depression and the Deliverator, which in turn attracts the attention of Wendy Deere, a corporate thieftaker. After adventures through Everyman's London and (via an extradimensional passage) past and mythical versions of the city, Evelyn acquires the book, Rupert is presumed lost, and the gang awaits their next adventure.

== Quantum of Nightmares ==
Quantum of Nightmares
- Author: Charles Stross
- Language: English
- Series: Laundry Files
- Genre: Science fiction
- Set in: December 2016
- Publisher: Tor
- Publication date: 2022
- Publication place: United Kingdom
- Media type: Print (hardcover)
- Pages: 368
- ISBN: 978-1250839374
- Preceded by: Dead Lies Dreaming

Quantum of Nightmares is the second book in the "Tales of the New Management" trilogy, continuing the story of the main characters from Dead Lies Dreaming. It is set in December 2016 and was released in January 2022. The plot references elements of Mary Poppins and Sweeney Todd.

== Escape from Yokai Land ==
Escape from Yokai Land
- Author: Charles Stross
- Language: English
- Series: Laundry Files
- Genre: Science fiction
- Set in: March-April 2014
- Publisher: Tor/Forge
- Publication date: 2022
- Publication place: United Kingdom
- Media type: Print (hardcover)
- Pages: 96
- ISBN: 978-1250805706
- Preceded by: Quantum of Nightmares

Escape from Yokai Land (originally titled Escape from Puroland) is a novella in the Laundry Files series. It is set in March/April 2014 and was released in March 2022. The story takes place at the same time as The Nightmare Stacks and just before The Delirium Brief. The protagonist is Bob Howard, an intelligence agent for the Laundry. It is intended to explain why he wasn't in the UK during the events of The Nightmare Stacks.

Following the death of his boss Angleton in The Rhesus Chart, Laundry agent Bob Howard is promoted to replace him and has to take over Angleton's ongoing projects. One of those projects is overseeing the wards that lock down magical sites outside the United Kingdom. Consequently, Bob has to travel to Tokyo on an overseas liaison mission with the Miyamoto Group in Japan, partnering with Dr. Yoko Suzuki. The Miyamoto Group is the Japanese equivalent of the Laundry and Dr. Suzuki is part of the Groups's Department of Apocryphal Organisms.

The nominal purpose of Bob's mission is to police minor versions of Yōkai: a class of supernatural entities and spirits in Japan now growing more active as CASE NIGHTMARE GREEN progresses. But it becomes apparent that the real reason he's been brought to Japan is to confront an existential threat in the form of a hellmouth located beneath the Puroland theme park and a terrifying version of the Princess Kitty cartoon character.

== Season of Skulls ==
Season of Skulls
- Author: Charles Stross
- Language: English
- Series: Laundry Files
- Genre: Science fiction
- Set in: March 2017 and summer of 1816
- Publisher: Tor/Forge
- Publication date: 2023
- Publication place: United Kingdom
- Media type: Print (hardcover)
- Pages: 384
- ISBN: 978-1250839398
- Preceded by: Escape from Yokai Land

Season of Skulls is the third book in the "Tales of the New Management" trilogy, continuing the story that began in Dead Lies Dreaming and Quantum of Nightmares. It is set in March 2017 (and the summer of 1816) and was released in May 2023. It combines elements of Regency fiction with The Prisoner.

== A Conventional Boy ==
A Conventional Boy
- Author: Charles Stross
- Language: English
- Series: Laundry Files
- Genre: Science fiction
- Set in: 2011-12
- Publisher: Tor/Forge
- Publication date: 2025
- Publication place: United Kingdom
- Media type: Print (hardcover)
- Pages: 224
- ISBN: 978-1250357847
- Preceded by: Season of Skulls

A Conventional Boy is a novel in the Laundry Files series, released in January 2025. It is a prequel that describes the backstory for Derek Reilly and his dice. It is set around 2011-2012 in-setting.

In 1984 middle England, Derek Reilly was a teenage nerd. During the Satanic panic, Derek and his Dungeons & Dragons group were arrested by the Laundry under the incorrect belief that they were engaging in real magic (a contemporary conspiracy theory about D&D). He and his group were thrown into Camp Sunshine (a prison introduced in The Delirium Brief). While the other players were eventually released, Derek learned too much while imprisoned and failed to advocate for his own release as well as he could have, becoming "institutionalized". Eventually he really did learn something of the arcane arts from the other cultists he was imprisoned with. As a compliant prisoner, he eventually became trusted enough to be allowed correspondence with the outside world; he took a hobby of running a play-by-mail game of D&D modified with his own house rules. Decades later, after reading a newspaper article about a gaming convention nearby and with the approval of his oracular dice, he decides to break out of prison to attend, and perhaps catch up with his remote players. What Derek and the other attendees do not know is that other cultists will be attending as well, and Derek will have to use his unusual skills to save the day.

Stross describes it as an "interstitial novel", filing in details about Derek Reilly (aka Derek the DM) and Iris Carpenter (specifically her prison sentence) between novels. In the series timeline Derek would later appear in The Nightmare Stacks. Iris Carpenter first appeared in The Fuller Memorandum after which she was imprisoned but reappeared later in the timeline as the need for extreme measures grew.

One review by CT Phipps praised the book for its use of "realistic" horror in the Satanic panic's victims (which really happened) with the pulpier horror of the Laundry Files setting. Phipps thought that the unfairness of Derek's situation resonated with the reader. He did think that the ending was a touch too happy, and that it was disappointing Derek never gets to settle up with his original captors. A review in Locus magazine by Russel Letson praised the "thoughtful reflection" in Stross's afterword, which went over some of the real-life horrors of moral panics and witch hunts, of which the campaign against tabletop gaming was just one example.

== The Regicide Report ==
The Regicide Report
- Author: Charles Stross
- Language: English
- Series: Laundry Files
- Genre: Science fiction
- Set in: on or before May 2015
- Publisher: Tor/Forge
- Publication date: January 27, 2026
- Publication place: United Kingdom
- Media type: Print (hardcover)
- Pages: 336
- ISBN: 9781250373861
- Preceded by: A Conventional Boy

The Regicide Report is a novel in the Laundry Files series, released in January 2026. It is set around March-May 2015 or February-May 2015 in-setting. It is the final book in the Laundry Files series.

The book is dominated by the plans of two characters, although this does not become apparent until the end

- Fabian Everyman is not human. He is the earthly avatar of the Elder God Nyarlathotep, and Prime Minister of the United Kingdom. He wants to unite totally with Nyarlathotep and secure his position as PM. He intends to do this by poisoning Queen Elizabeth II, forcing her suspension and vampirization, and inserting Nyarlathotep acolytes (including the coterie of the Queen's physician Dr Phibes) into the ceremony to use the mana harvested to summon and unite him totally with Nyarlathotep.
- Michael Armstrong is human. He is the Senior Auditor of the Laundry and its continuity. He installed Everyman as PM in earlier novels to avert a greater evil, but Everyman has proven remarkably competent, winning a General Election to legitimise his position and cannot be easily dislodged. Armstrong is aware of Everyman's plan and subverts it by inserting other acolytes (including the sentient violin known as "Lecter") into the plan to instead summon another god, the King in Yellow. He hopes that Everyman will expend the mana whilst battling the King in Yellow and so fail in his own union.

The book takes place as these plans interact. Laundry operatives Bob Howard and his wife Dominique "Mo" O'Brien investigate the Queen's poisoning, interact with many characters from previous books (Iris, Mhairi, Pete, and others), get caught in the backwash from the plans such as a Gashadokuro made from former monarchs, come to terms with the effects the previous books have had on them (Bob accepts that he did not survive the events of The Fuller Memorandum and is instead the Eater of Souls cosplaying him), and as the bodycount rises, both take part in the climax in the temple of the Sleeper.

Armstrong's plan wins. Everyman defeats the King in Yellow but in the process cannot complete his own union. In revenge he kills and dismembers Armstrong, displaying his bodyparts in various sites around London. The Queen is in suspended animation, Everyman is secure as PM, and the UK accepts the New Management and the stability it offers. The Laundry operatives are enfolded into a new department, the Department of Existential Anthropic Threats (DEAT) and SOE Q-division, informally known as "The Laundry", no longer exists.

The book ends in an afterword from the author Charles Stross, recognising The Regicide Report as the capstone to the twenty-five year project that was the book series "The Laundry Files", and brings the series itself to an end.

A review by Russell Letson of Locus praised the book, although noting it had the mood of a "video game apocalypse" or a final showdown in a Marvel movie. He thought that Bob's anger in-story was channeling Stross's own anger in real life at the problem of how autocracies develop.

== Novellas, spin-offs, and related works ==
Stross' short stories "Down on the Farm", "Overtime", and "Equoid" are within the same Laundry continuity. "Down on the Farm" and "Equoid" both take place between the second and third novels (2007 in the setting); "Overtime" takes place between the third and fourth novels (2009 in setting). "Equoid" won the 2014 Hugo Award for best novella, and "Overtime" was a shortlist nominee for the 2010 Hugo Award for best novelette.

Stross's 2000 short story "A Colder War" also mixes elements of Lovecraft and espionage, and is perhaps a precursor to the Laundry stories; however, the fictional background and assumptions are different, and it is its own distinct setting (as the world is destroyed at the end of it, the Laundry series is clearly not a sequel).

Cubicle 7 published The Laundry, a role-playing game based on the Laundry stories in July 2010. On June 21, 2024 a successful Kickstarter was completed on a second edition of the game to be released in early 2025.

Stross published a short non-canonical work set in the Laundry Files universe on a fanfiction website, "The Howard/O'Brien Relate Counseling Session Transcripts – Part 1".

== Audiobook versions ==
Audiobook versions of the novels in the Laundry Files series have been narrated by Gideon Emery, Elle Newlands, Jack Hawkins, Caroline Guthrie, and Bianca Amato.

== See also ==
- Declare, by Tim Powers
- The Spiraling Worm, by David Conyers and John Sunseri
- Delta Green role-playing game
- The Laundry role-playing game
