= The Laundry =

Tabletop role-playing game

A roleplaying game based on the "Laundry Files" novels by Charles Stross
- Cover by Malcolm McClinton
- Designers: Gareth Hanrahan; Jason Durall; John Snead
- Publishers: Cubicle 7
- Publication: 2010; 16 years ago
- Genres: Horror
- Systems: Basic Role-Playing
- ISBN: 978-1907204937

The Laundry is a tabletop role-playing game published by Cubicle 7 in 2010. The game is based on novelist Charles Stross's The Laundry Files series.

== Description ==
The Laundry is a game where agents have to deal with Lovecraftian outer gods and British bureaucracy at the same time.

== Publication history ==
=== First edition ===
Cubicle 7 used their Basic Role-Playing license to create The Laundry (2010), based on The Laundry Files series of novels by Charles Stross. The game was published in July 2010.

Cubicle 7 subsequently published a number of supplements:

- Black Bag Jobs, a compilation of scenarios.
- The Agent's Handbook which develops the agents' characters and the internal procedures of the organization.
- The Mythos Dossiers, a compilation of in-game documents to use as play-aids and scenario seeds.
- License To Summon, which give more details on the various forms of sorcery in the game universe.
- God Game Black, which provides more information on the Sleeper's Plateau and how to introduce an eschaton menace in the game.
- Cultists Under The Bed gives more information on the working of various forms of sects and cultists, with several examples of organizations.
- Unconventional Diplomacy, a compilation of scenarios.
- Targets Of Acquisition, which provides dossiers of several occult artefacts.
- As Above, So Below, introduces rules for using special forces in the game and adding a political dimension to games. It also includes two new scenarios.

A GM screen was announced but was never released. Cubicle 7's licensing agreement with Chaosium expired by mutual agreement at the end of 2017. In 2019 Cubicle 7 stated that the licensing issue would need to be resolved, or a new system introduced, before a revised edition could be published. In July 2023, Charles Stross announced that a second edition was in the works.

=== Second edition ===
On June 19th 2025, Cubicle 7 announced the second edition of the game with books available in PDF and printed version available for pre-order. This edition is not based on the Basic Roleplaying System and instead uses a completely new system, based on a pool of six-sided dice.

== Awards ==
- 2011 ENnie for Best New Game - Silver Winner
