= National Holistic Institute =

Private, for-profit college of massage therapy in Emeryville, California, US

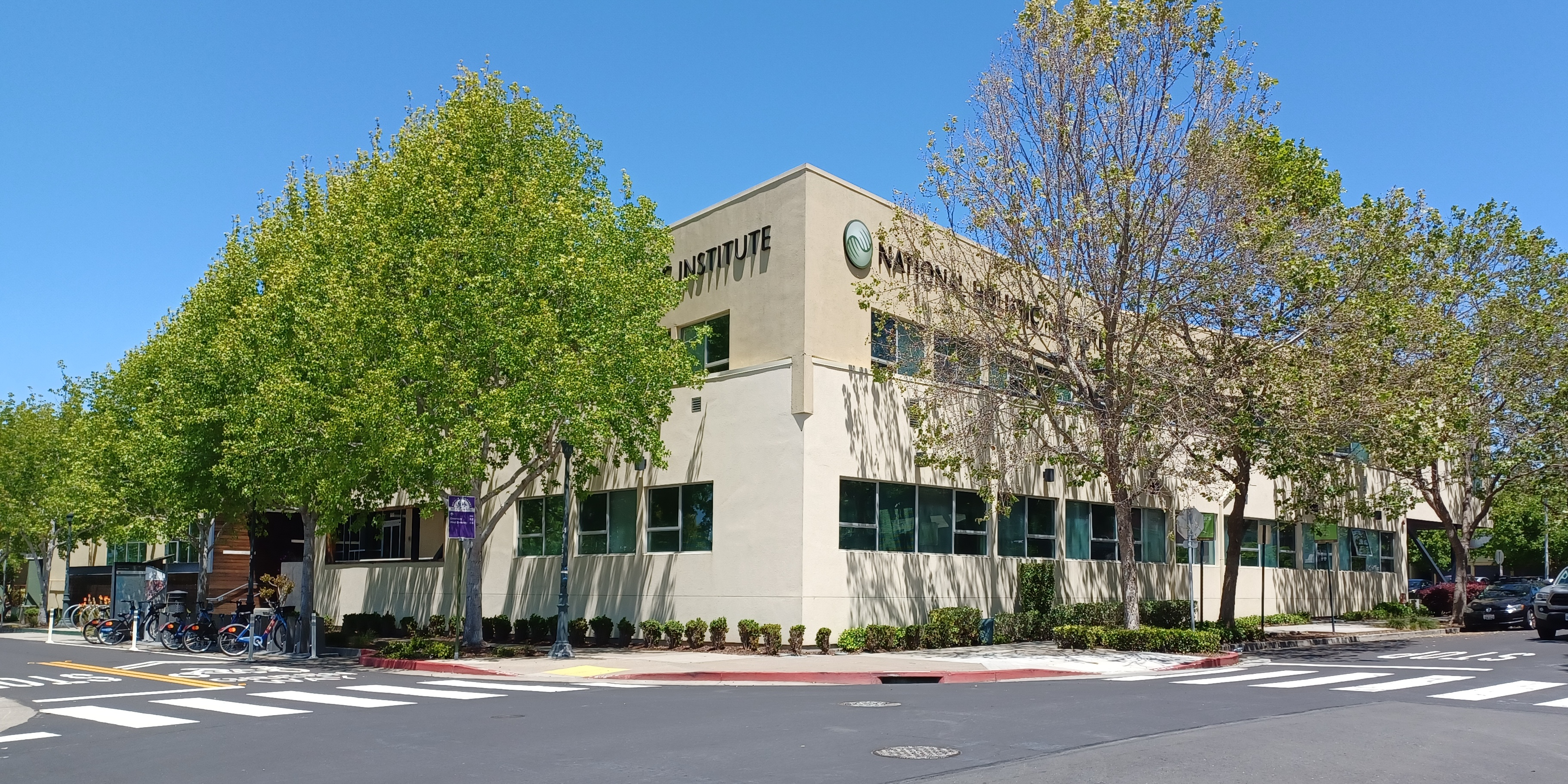
National Holistic Institute

National Holistic Institute (NHI) is a private, for-profit college of massage therapy in Emeryville, California. It was founded in 1979.

== History ==
NHI was founded by Carol Carpenter, who learned massage informally and sought to develop a professional training program for massage. Carpenter sought to improve massage therapy education developing a program teaching, western style massage therapy, eastern style massage therapy, anatomy and kinesiology, with marketing and business classes.

The school of massage therapy began in a house on College Avenue in Oakland, CA, and grew steadily. In 1989, the NHI school moved to Emeryville, CA.

NHI founder Carol Carpenter played a prominent national role as massage therapy became more popular. NHI’s massage therapy education and faculty were nationally respected.

The school continued to grow in the 1990s and early 2000s. In 2003, Mason Myers and Tim Veitzer purchased NHI from the school's founder.

In 2005, the National Holistic Institute opened campuses in San Jose, CA, and Petaluma, CA. In 2006, NHI opened a campus in the San Fernando Valley of Los Angeles (Encino, CA) by acquiring the Touch Therapy Institute. In 2007, NHI opened a campus in San Francisco, California and one in Sacramento, California in 2011. In 2010, the Los Angeles campus moved from Encino to Studio City. In May 2012, NHI opened its 7th campus in Santa Ana, Orange County, California. In 2017 the Petaluma campus moved to Santa Rosa, CA and shortly after, the San Francisco campus closed.

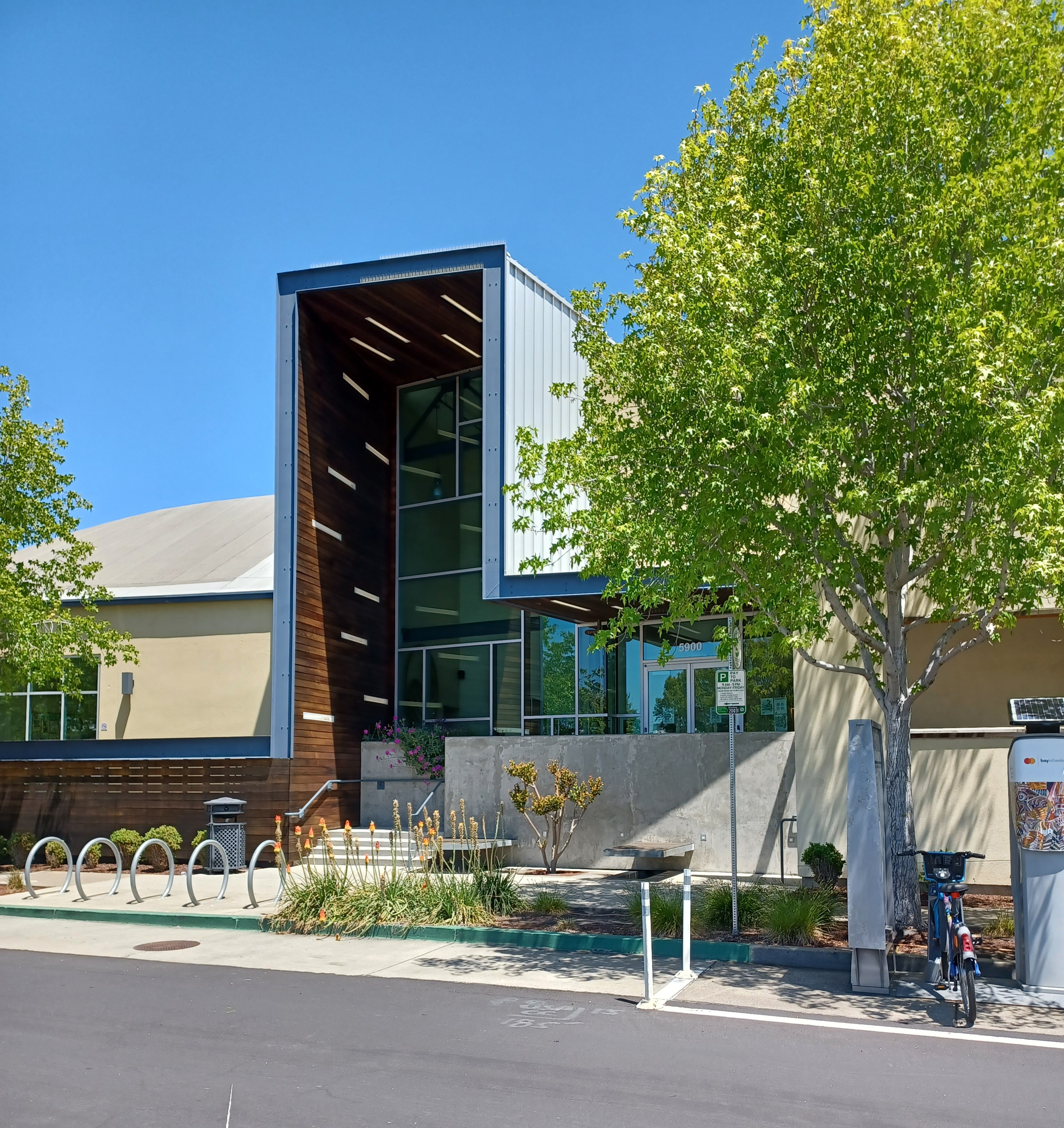
Emeryville campus

NHI now has campuses in Emeryville, Studio City (Los Angeles area), Santa Rosa, Sacramento, San Jose, Redding, Clovis, Ontario, Modesto and Santa Ana. It is currently California's largest accredited massage therapy school and continues to grow with its recent acquisition of Bauman College of Holistic Nutrition.

NHI campuses are known for their affordable massage treatments offered through their student massage clinics. These clinics provide learning opportunities for students where they can evaluate client therapeutic needs in a structured environment while practicing their newly acquired massage skills.

== Accreditations and approvals ==
- As a continuing education program, nationally accredited by the Accrediting Council for Continuing Education & Training.
- Eligible Training Provider, California Employment Development Department.
- Qualifies students for the National Certification Exam for massage and California Massage Therapy Council Certification.
