= Spectrum SF =

SF Magazine

- Status: Defunct
- Founded: 1999
- Founder: Paul Fraser
- Country of origin: United Kingdom
- Headquarters location: Scotland
- Publication types: Periodicals
- Fiction genres: science fiction
- Official website: www.spectrumsf.co.uk previously www.spectrumpublishing.com

Spectrum SF was a paperback format magazine that published short and serial length works of science fiction. It was edited by Paul Fraser and published nine issues between 2000 and 2002.

The magazine published work by Keith Roberts, Charles Stross, Eric Brown, Mary Soon Lee, Alastair Reynolds, and Stephen Baxter. Spectrum SF published the first appearance of the Laundry Files in The Atrocity Archive from Stross.
