= Accelerando =

2005 science fiction novel by Charles Stross

- Author: Charles Stross
- Cover artist: Rita Frangie
- Language: English
- Genre: Science fiction, short stories
- Publisher: Orbit (UK), Ace (US)
- Publication date: 5 July 2005
- Publication place: United Kingdom & United States
- Media type: Print (hardcover), Ebook
- Pages: 400 pp
- Awards: Locus Award for Best Science Fiction Novel (2006)
- ISBN: 978-0-441-01284-8
- OCLC: 57682282
- Dewey Decimal: 813/.6 22
- LC Class: PR6119.T79 A63 2005

Accelerando is a 2005 science fiction novel consisting of a series of interconnected short stories written by British author Charles Stross. As well as normal hardback and paperback editions, it was released as a free e-book under the CC BY-NC-ND license. Accelerando won the Locus Award in 2006, and was nominated for several other awards in 2005 and 2006, including the Hugo, Campbell, Clarke, and British Science Fiction Association Awards.

== Title ==
In Italian, accelerando means "speeding up" and is used as a tempo marking in musical notation. In Stross' novel, it refers to the accelerating rate at which humanity in general, and/or the novel's characters, head towards the technological singularity.

== Plot introduction ==
The book is a collection of nine short stories telling the tale of three generations of a family before, during, and after a technological singularity. It was originally written as a series of novelettes and novellas, all published in Asimov's Science Fiction magazine in the period 2001 to 2004. According to Stross, the initial inspiration for the stories was his experience working as a programmer for a high-growth company during the dot-com boom of the 1990s.

The first three stories follow the character of agalmic "venture altruist" Manfred Macx, starting in the early 21st century; the next three stories follow his daughter Amber; and the final three focus largely on Amber's son Sirhan in the completely transformed world at the end of the century.

== Plot concepts ==
Stross describes humanity's situation in Accelerando as dire:

In the background of what looks like a Panglossian techno-optimist novel, horrible things are happening. Most of humanity is wiped out, then arbitrarily resurrected in mutilated form by the Vile Offspring. Capitalism eats everything then the logic of competition pushes it so far that merely human entities can no longer compete; we're a fat, slow-moving, tasty resource – like the dodo. Our narrative perspective, Aineko, is not a talking cat: it's a vastly superintelligent AI, coolly calculating, that has worked out that human beings are more easily manipulated if they think they're dealing with a furry toy. The cat body is a sock puppet wielded by an abusive monster.

As events progress in Accelerando, the planets of the Solar System are dismantled over time to form a Matrioshka brain, a vast solar-powered computational device inhabited by minds inconceivably more advanced and complex than naturally evolved intelligences such as human beings. This proves to be a normal stage in the life-cycle of an inhabited solar system; the galaxies are revealed to be filled with such Matrioshka brains. Intelligent consciousnesses outside of Matrioshka brains may communicate via wormhole networks.

The notion that the universe is dominated by a communications network of superintelligences bears comparison with Olaf Stapledon's 1937 science-fiction novel Star Maker, although Stapledon's advanced civilisations are said to communicate psychically rather than via wormholes.

== Characters ==
- Manfred Macx: Venture altruist, protagonist of the early stories.
- Aineko: Manfred's robotic, increasingly intelligent cat.
- The Lobsters: Sentient nervous-system state vectors originating from Panulirus interruptus, the California spiny lobster.
- Bob Franklin: Billionaire investor; originator of the Franklin Collective, a "borganism" composed of multiple bodies sharing the same mind.
- Annette Dimarcos: Arianespace employee; Manfred's second wife.
- Pamela: Manfred's partner, later first wife.
- Gianni Vittoria: Former Italian Minister for Economic Affairs, sometime Minister for Transhuman Affairs, economic theoretician.
- Amber Macx: Manfred and Pamela's daughter.
- Dr. Sadeq Khurasani: Muslim imam, engineer, Field Circus crewman.
- The Wunch: Predatory alien virtual constructs embedded in the wormhole router orbiting Hyundai.
- The Slug: Sentient alien corporation/economy/419 scam from the router.
- Sirhan al-Khurasani: Son of Amber and Sadeq's physical versions.
- Vile Offspring: Derogatory term for the posthuman "weakly godlike intelligences" that inhabit the inner Solar System by the novel's end.

== Plot summary and breakdown by story ==
In the following table, the chapter number (#), chapter name and original magazine date of publication, and a brief synopsis are given. The nine stories are grouped into three parts.

#	Chapter/Date of original publication	Part 1 : Slow Takeoff – Synopsis
1	"Lobsters"; June 2001	In early-21st-century Amsterdam, Manfred receives a call on a courier-delivered phone from entities claiming to be a net-based AI working for KGB .ru, seeking his help on how to defect. Eventually, he discovers the callers are actually uploaded brain-scans of the California spiny lobster looking to escape from humanity's interference. Driven by his commitment to agalmic economics, he manages to team them up with entrepreneur Bob Franklin, who is looking for an AI to crew his nascent spacefaring project—the building of a self-replicating factory complex from cometary material. A legal precedent is established that will help define the rights of future AIs and uploaded minds. Later, Manfred's predatory fiancée Pamela forces him to impregnate and marry her in an attempt to control him.
2	"Troubadour"; October 2001	Three years later, Manfred is in the throes of an acrimonious divorce, and has a daughter from his marriage to Pamela, frozen as a newly fertilised embryo. He meets Annette again, and begins a relationship with her. Three schemes—a workable state centralised planning apparatus that can interface with external market systems, a way to upload the entirety of the 20th century's out-of-copyright film and music to the net, and a plan to thwart his grasping wife and her lawyers—come together perfectly. Amber, Manfred's daughter, has been defrosted and born, and is being brought up by Pamela.
3	"Tourist"; February 2002	In Edinburgh, five years later, Manfred is mugged and his memories (stored in cyberware) are stolen, forcing him to rediscover who he is and what he's doing in Edinburgh. Meanwhile, the Lobsters are thriving in colonies situated at the L5 point, and on a comet in the asteroid belt; they, along with the Jet Propulsion Laboratory and the ESA, have picked up encrypted signals from outside the Solar System. Bob Franklin, now dead, is personality-reconstructed in the Franklin Collective. Manfred, his memories recovered, moves to further expand the rights of non-human intelligences. Aineko begins its own study—and decoding—of the alien signals.
#	Chapter	Part 2 : Point of Inflection – Synopsis
4	"Halo"; June 2002	A decade later, Amber Macx —now in her early teens— finally breaks free from her domineering mother by utilising a complex plot, thought up by Manfred and Annette, in which she enslaves herself via a Yemeni shell corporation and later enlists aboard a Franklin Collective-owned, youth-crewed spacecraft, mining materials from Amalthea, Jupiter's third moon. Pamela petitions the imam Sadeq to issue an Islamic legal judgment against Amber, which she thwarts by setting up her own empire on a small, privately owned asteroid, thus making herself sovereign. In the meantime, the alien signals have been decoded, and a physical journey to a mentioned "router" is planned.
5	"Router"; September 2002	The alien router, orbiting a 3-light-year-distant brown dwarf star named Hyundai +4904/-56, is visited by the spacecraft Field Circus, a Coke-can-sized mass of computronium propelled by a Jupiter-based laser and a lightsail. Amber and 62 others have uploaded themselves to become the virtualised crew. They are contacted by a group of aliens called "The Wunch", who occupy virtual bodies based on Lobster patterns "borrowed" from Manfred's original transmissions. The Wunch turn out to be thieving, third-rate "barbarians" who, after a struggle, are thwarted. Amber and a few others make the decision to travel deep into the router's wormhole network.
6	"Nightfall"; April 2003	The router explorers find themselves trapped by yet more malign aliens in a variety of virtual spaces, but are eventually set free by Aineko's machinations. They discover that they are being hosted in a Matrioshka brain, the builders of which seem to have disappeared (or been destroyed by their own creations), leaving an anarchy ruled by sentient, viral corporations and scavengers who attempt to use newcomers as currency. The crew finally escape by offering passage to a "rogue alien corporation" (a "pyramid scheme crossed with a 419 scam"), virtualised as a giant slug, who opens a powered route out. Thereafter, the crew begins the journey back home.
#	Chapter	Part 3 : Singularity – Synopsis
7	"Curator"; December 2003	Back in Earth's Solar System, the crew find that "home" is now Saturn, on a floating habitat in the planet's upper atmosphere, where they meet Sirhan, son of the physical Amber and Sadeq, who both stayed (and died) at home. The crew upload their virtual states into new bodies, and find that they are all now bankrupt, unable to compete with the new Economics 2.0 model practised by the posthuman intelligences of the inner system. Manfred, Pamela, and Annette are present in various forms. Bailiffs—sentient enforcement constructs—arrive to "repossess" Amber and Aineko, but a scheme is hatched whereby the Slug is introduced to Economics 2.0, which keeps both constructs very busy.
8	"Elector"; September 2004	In the increasingly populated Saturnian floating cities, Amber, Annette, Gianni and Manfred begin a political campaign to finance a scheme to escape the predations of the "Vile Offspring" by journeying once more to the router network, with Amber as the leader of the "Accelerationista" party. She loses the election (to the stay-at-home "conservationista" faction), but once more the Lobsters step in to help, by offering passage to uploads on their large ships if the humans agree to act as explorers and mappers.
9	"Survivor"; October 2004	In the centuries following the singularity, the router has, once again, been reached. Learning from it, the refugees have created their own network, enabling them to explore vast distances. Habitats built around Hyundai are home to copies that wish to stay put, including child-clones. Aineko returns to make Manfred an offer that, if he accepts it, will result in Aineko leaving them alone forever.

== Allusions/references to contemporary science ==
The novel contains numerous allusions to real-world scientific concepts and individuals, including:

- The lobster stomatogastric ganglion (STG)
- Rubberized concrete
- The Fermi paradox: Stross offers a solution to the paradox, claiming that the apparent lack of intelligent life in the universe is an illusion created by a shortage of bandwidth (see information theory).
- The Menger sponge
- The Austrian roboticist and futurist Hans Moravec, who is mentioned numerous times
- Quantum state vectors
- The nanoassembly conformational problem
- Ken Thompson's compiler hack
- Penrose tiling
- Noam Chomsky's example sentence, Colorless green ideas sleep furiously
- A Dyson sphere and its variants
- Aerogel

== Awards and nominations ==
Accelerando won the 2006 Locus Award for Best Science Fiction Novel, and the 2010 Estonian SF Award for Best Translated Novel of 2009. Additionally, the novel was shortlisted for several other awards, including:

- 2005 BSFA award
- 2006 Hugo Award for Best Novel
- 2006 Arthur C. Clarke Award
- 2006 John W. Campbell Memorial Award

=== Individual short stories ===
The original short story "Lobsters" (June 2001) was shortlisted for:

- 2002 Hugo Award for Best Novelette
- Nebula Award for Best Novelette
- Theodore Sturgeon Award

The original short story "Halo" (June 2002) was shortlisted for:

- 2003 Hugo Award for Best Novelette
- Theodore Sturgeon Award

The original short story "Router" (September 2002) was shortlisted for:

- 2003 BSFA Award

The original short story "Nightfall" (April 2003) was shortlisted for:

- 2004 Hugo Award for Best Novelette

The original short story "Elector" (September 2004) was shortlisted for:

- 2005 Hugo Award for Best Novella

== Release details ==
- Ace (US), hardcover, July 2005, ISBN 0-441-01284-1
- Ace (US), paperback, July 2006, ISBN 0-441-01415-1
- Orbit (UK), hardcover, August 2005, ISBN 1-84149-390-2
- Orbit, UK, paperback, June 2006, ISBN 1-84149-389-9

=== Online versions ===
- The original short story Elector (September 2004) is available at Asimov's Science Fiction.
- A searchable SiSU version of the complete novel is available in multiple formats.
- A ManyBooks version with format selection is also available.
- Charles Stross also makes epub, mobi, aportis and rtf versions of Accelerando available for download from his blog.

== See also ==
- Copyleft
- Post-scarcity
- Simulated reality
- Singularity Sky, another Stross novel dealing with a technological singularity
- Technological singularity
- Transhumanism
