= Space bridge =

Space bridge may refer to one of the following

- Orbiting skyhooks, an orbiting tether space transportation system that can be built with existing materials and technology
- Space elevator, a hypothetical device
- US-Soviet Space Bridge, a 1980's joint US-Soviet show.
- Electronika IM-09 - Space Bridge (Электроника ИМ-09 - Космический мост), a clone of Nintendo's Fire from the Game & Watch
- Space Bridge, a fictional interstellar transportation system in the Transformers universe, first seen in the episode in "Transport to Oblivion"
