= Missile Gap =

2006 novella by Charles Stross

- Cover of first edition (hardcover)
- Author: Charles Stross
- Illustrator: J. K. Potter
- Language: English
- Genre: Science fiction novel
- Publisher: Subterranean Press (US)
- Publication date: 31 December 2006; 19 years ago
- Publication place: United Kingdom
- Media type: Print (hardcover)
- Pages: 99 pp
- ISBN: 1-59606-058-1
- OCLC: 82457976

"Missile Gap" is a 2006 English language science fiction novella, originally published in the anthology One Million A.D. by British author Charles Stross. It won the Locus Award for best novella of 2006. The novella was republished in Stross's short-story collection Wireless in 2009.

== Plot ==
On 2 October 1962, the universe underwent a change – instantly, the continents of the Earth were no longer wrapped onto a spherical planet but were on the surface of an Alderson disk. Measurements on Cepheid variable stars indicate that the Alderson disk is located in the Lesser Magellanic Cloud, and that the epoch is roughly 800,000 years later than the calendar date (give or take 100,000 to 200,000 years). In the sky, the stars of the Milky Way are reddened and metal-depleted, evidence that it is now controlled by a Type-III civilisation capable of controlling the resources of an entire galaxy. Three theories for the change are suggested within the novella:

1. the atoms making up the surface and people of Earth have somehow peeled off the Earth and shipped to a new location.
2. Marvin Minsky suggests that a snapshot of the world was taken and the snapshot has been used as the basis for a physical recreation.
3. Hans Moravec suggests that a snapshot of the world was taken and the snapshot has been used as the basis for a simulated reality.

The first hypothesis would indicate that the characters of the book are the original humans of the 20th century Earth. The latter two hypotheses would indicate that the characters of the book are duplicates of humans that lived and died thousands of years previously. The creatures that moved or copied humanity are unknown, as is the technology they used and the purpose for their action.

Because of the projection of a spherical surface onto a flat surface, some changes occur: North America is now much farther from Asia, as there is no polar route. Furthermore, launching an artificial satellite into orbit becomes impossible, and chemical-fuelled ICBMs are no longer capable of reaching other continents. The gravitational attraction in the near field of an Alderson disk does not drop away according to the inverse-square law but is approximately constant and perpendicular to the disk, so missile trajectories become parabolic rather than segments of elliptical orbits. Thus, both the strategic bomber and ICBM "legs" of the nuclear triad are no longer feasible so nuclear deterrence breaks down, and the Soviet Union takes advantage of this to conquer much of Western Europe. The deterrent role is then taken over by long-range nuclear-powered cruise missiles.

Cold War tensions between the two super states provide the in-between plot direction. There are several sub-plots – the exploration of the new world by both superpowers forms much of the major plot.

Yuri Gagarin captains a huge, nuclear-powered Ekranoplan on behalf of the Soviets, whilst the US launch cruise liners filled with colonists for exotic new continents beyond the boundaries of the old Earth. On one such colony, Madelaine Holbright (initially a housewife) begins an affair with John Martin, an entomologist who is almost fatally stung by native termites which begin to display signs of intelligence. During his travels, Gagarin turns up further examples of other "Earths" far away from the currently inhabited areas, with cities that have clearly been destroyed in nuclear war in the distant past.

A character named Gregor Samsa seems to be highly connected with the US Government, and is later shown to be in fact an advanced alien termite with pheromone control, and is guiding the transplanted humanity towards nuclear destruction, to clear the path for the "mock aboriginal termites" that have previously stung Martin. Eventually Gregor is successful, and humanity is destroyed in a nuclear exchange – Gregor's intelligence is saved and it is heavily implied that not only has this happened before, but that it will happen again, supporting (but not actually confirming) the second two of the suggested theories.

To explain plot sections and provide background information, Stross makes use of themes that recur in his works – the use of security clearance briefings, and codewords to imply secret levels of information – COLLECTION and RUBY for Missile Gap

== Reception ==
Publishers Weekly described the novella as a "blend of 1900s H. G. Wells and 1970s propaganda, updated for the 21st century in the clear, chilly and fashionably cynical style that lets Stross get away with premises that would be absurdly cheesy in anyone else's hands." Carl Hays in his review for Booklist called the novel a "bizarre, nevertheless brilliant alternate-history novella featuring a protracted U.S.–Soviet cold war."
