= Saturn's Children (novel) =

2008 novel by Charles Stross

- First edition cover
- Author: Charles Stross
- Audio read by: Bianca Amato
- Language: English
- Genre: Science fiction, Space opera
- Publisher: Ace (US); Orbit (UK)
- Publication date: July 1, 2008 (US); 3 July 2008 (UK)
- Publication place: United States; United Kingdom
- Media type: Print (Hardcover)
- Pages: 336 (US); 384 (UK)
- ISBN: 0-441-01594-8 (US)
- OCLC: 202548412
- Dewey Decimal: 823/.92 22
- LC Class: PR6119.T79 S28 2008
- Followed by: Neptune's Brood

Saturn's Children is a 2008 science fiction novel by British author Charles Stross. Stross called it "a space opera and late-period [Robert A.] Heinlein tribute", specifically to Heinlein's 1982 novel Friday.

The novel was nominated for the 2009 Hugo Award for Best Novel, the 2009 Locus Award for Best Science Fiction Novel, and was a finalist for the 2009 Prometheus Award. An audiobook version narrated by Bianca Amato was released in 2009.

== Plot ==
The novel chronicles the travels and perils of Freya Nakamichi-47, a gynoid in a distant future in which humanity is extinct and a near-feudal android society has spread throughout the Solar System. Wealthy and self-indulgent "aristos" own and have enslaved most of the populace; the remaining "free" androids struggle to keep themselves independent and can rarely afford the exorbitant costs of interplanetary travel. Freya, a robotic courtesan originally designed to please humans but activated a century after their mysterious extinction, is considered obsolete and works menial jobs to survive. When she offends an aristo and needs to escape off-world, she accepts a job as a courier for the mysterious Jeeves Corporation and becomes embroiled in a complex and dangerous war among factions conspiring against each other for control of society.

== Influences ==
Saturn's Children is an homage to the works of Isaac Asimov and Robert A. Heinlein, in particular Heinlein's 1982 novel Friday. The novel opens with an explanation of Asimov's Three Laws of Robotics, and then establishes that humans are extinct. Jesse Willis of SFFaudio.com commented:

Stross has quite a lot of fun playing with the world he’s created here, naming a city Heinleingrad, naming a robot butler character after P. G. Wodehouse’s famous “gentleman’s personal gentleman." It all mostly works with Saturn’s Children seeming to take most of its inspiration though from Heinlein’s novel Friday. Both novels feature artificial female persons as secret couriers, both tell their own stories, both secrete their smuggled cargos in their abdomens. Later on in Saturn’s Children there is some playing with the ideas promulgated in Heinlein’s 1970 novel I Will Fear No Evil. And, identity, in a world where brain data, and brain states, are easily and quickly copyable, isn’t as simple as it is with us meatbags.

== Critical reception ==
Bookmarks magazine called the novel "a commentary on identity and free will in a post-human galaxy", adding:

The combination of sex and violence clashes a bit with some deep philosophizing on identity and purpose, though Stross’s sense of humor and Freya’s rollicking adventure transcend what SF Reviews deems "some bizarre cross-genre hybrid." Many SF readers will appreciate the novel, deemed as one of Stross’s more accessible, and revel in the author’s numerous nods toward his influences; others might want to give it a pass.

Booklist praised Saturn's Children as “one of the most stylishly imaginative robot tales ever penned", and The Times described it as "a smart and playful romp.” The San Diego Union-Tribune called the novel “Good fun ... Heinlein himself would’ve liked this.” Calling it an "erotic futuristic thriller", Publishers Weekly pointed out that the novel contains "a deep message of how android slavery recapitulates humanity's past mistakes", but also suggests that Stross "struggles to make it heard over the moans and gunshots". Adrienne Martini of the Baltimore City Paper wrote that "Stross seems to be saying something about identity and class, but those larger ideas get buried in a labyrinthine plot that isn’t overly satisfying on its own," adding that "for a Heinlein fan, Saturn’s Children is an interesting game of spot the reference." Jesse Willis of SFFaudio.com wrote:

The idea of a post-human solar system is an interesting one, and Stross plays with it quite effectively ... This humanless solar system is ... quite vividly explored, with floating cities ... on Venus, waste heated bio-labs on the frozen dwarf planet of Eris, and a truly frightening description of what’s happened to poor old Earth ... The worst sin here is that the ending is rather weak.

Saturn's Children was nominated for the 2009 Hugo Award for Best Novel, the 2009 Locus Award for Best Science Fiction Novel, and was a finalist for the 2009 Prometheus Award.

== Sequels ==
Though Stross wrote Saturn's Children as a standalone novel, he published a short story sequel called "Bit Rot" in the 2010 anthology Engineering Infinity and later made it available online. In the story, a descendant android of Freya's named Lilith Nakamichi-47 is on a long interstellar voyage as a catastrophic event wreaks havoc on the spaceship and its occupants. Robert E. Waters of Tangent classified "Bit Rot" as "one of the hardest SF stories" in the anthology, and called it "one of the most clever zombie stories in recent memory." Lois Tilton of Locus agreed, calling it "an exceedingly neat idea for a space horror story, twisting the classic, and Stross, of course, works it out thoroughly well." Nigel Seel wrote for ScienceFiction.com:

[Hannu Rajaniemi's short story] The Server and the Dragon is ... classic SF in that it’s all head and no heart: emotional investment in the protagonist remains minimal. Charles Stross with "Bit Rot" has a similar problem ... Stross writes interestingly about the nature of the disaster and its effects on the ship and the entities on board, and our sympathies are with Lilith as events unfold ... I enjoyed the story but wondered whether I might have missed some deeper metaphor which Stross had intended.

In 2013 Stross released Neptune's Brood, a novel set later in the same universe as Saturn's Children, and called "Bit Rot" the "missing link" between the two novels.
