= Non-human intelligence =

Non-human intelligence (NHI) may refer to:

- Animal intelligence, the intelligence of animals
- Artificial intelligence, the intelligence of machines or software
- Extraterrestrial intelligence, the intelligence of life outside of Earth
