= Five Branches University =

Private university in California, United States

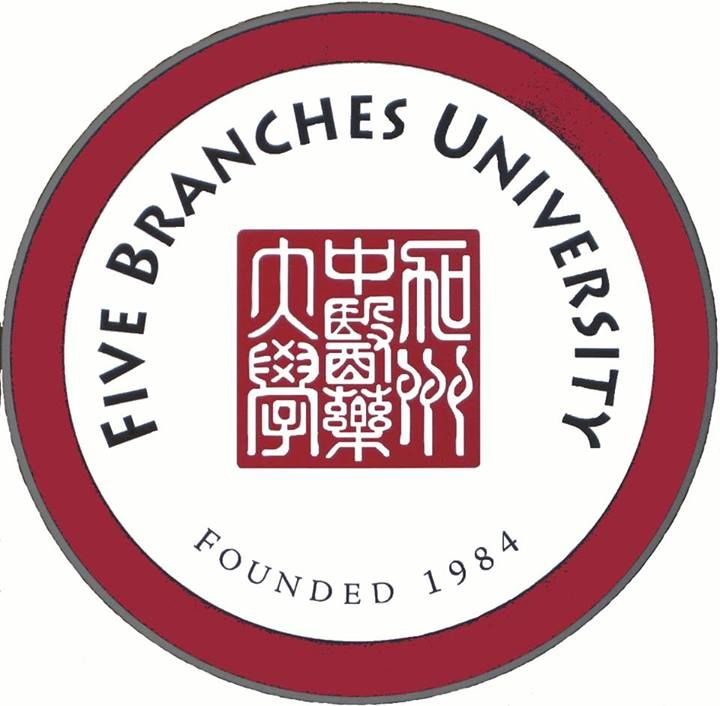
- Other names: FBU
- Type: Private university
- Established: 1984
- President: Ron Zaidman
- Academic staff: Over 100 members
- Administrative staff: 76 over two campuses
- Location: Santa Cruz; San Jose; 36°57′51″N 121°59′53″W
- Colors: Red and gold
- Website: www.fivebranches.edu

Five Branches University is a private university with two campuses in the U.S. state of California, one in Santa Cruz and one in San Jose.

== History ==
Five Branches University was founded in Santa Cruz on February 4, 1984.

In 2005, Five Branches University opened their second campus in San Jose in Tisch Tower at the end of the famous Santana Row. In the spring of 2016, the Santa Jose Campus moved to its current location on Lundy Ave.

== Academics ==
Five Branches University is accredited by the Accreditation Commission for Acupuncture and Herbal Medicine (ACAHM).

The school offers three degrees:

- Dual Degree Doctor/Master of Traditional Chinese Medicine (DTCM/MTCM)
- Master of Acupuncture(MAc)
- Doctor of Acupuncture & Oriental Medicine (DAOM) degree
