= Palimpsest (novella) =

2009 science fiction novella by Charles Stross

- Cover of first edition (hardcover)
- Author: Charles Stross
- Language: English
- Genre: Science fiction novel
- Publisher: Subterranean Press
- Publication date: 31 August 2011
- Publication place: United Kingdom
- Media type: Print (Hardcover & Paperback)
- Pages: 136 pp
- ISBN: 978-1596064218

Palimpsest is a 2009 science fiction novella by Charles Stross, exploring the conjunction of time travel and deep time. Originally published in Stross's 2009 collection Wireless, it won the 2010 Hugo Award for Best Novella.

Subterranean Press announced they would reprint the novella separately in 2011.

== Inspiration ==
Stross has stated that Palimpsest is effectively a rewrite of The End of Eternity, by Isaac Asimov.

== Plot ==
Pierce is a police officer with the Stasis, a special institution dedicated to the preservation of humanity by its agents who are able to travel through time. After every extinction event resulting in humanity's end, the Stasis reseeds Earth with a replacement group of humans time-jumped from an earlier era. However, the Opposition, an organisation that seems to struggle against the Stasis, has been created over time, and it seems that Pierce is somehow tied to it.
