= Charles Stross =

British author (born 1964)

- Stross in 2024 at Cymera Festival
- Born: 18 October 1964 (age 62); Leeds, England
- Education: University of Bradford
- Occupation: Writer
- Writing career
- Period: 1990s–present
- Genres: Science fiction, fantasy, horror
- Website: www.antipope.org/charlie/

Charles David George "Charlie" Stross (born 18 October 1964) is a British writer of science fiction and fantasy. Stross specialises in hard science fiction and space opera.

== Early life and education ==
Stross was born in Leeds, England. He showed an early interest in writing and wrote his first science fiction story at age 12.

He graduated with a bachelor's degree in pharmacy in 1986 and qualified as a pharmacist in 1987. In 1989, he enrolled at University of Bradford for a post-graduate degree in computer science.

== Career ==
Stross at Worldcon 75 in Helsinki, 2017

In the 1970s and 1980s, Stross published some role-playing game articles about Advanced Dungeons & Dragons in White Dwarf magazine. Some of his creatures, such as the death knight, githyanki (the name borrowed from George R. R. Martin's 1977 novel, Dying of the Light), githzerai, and slaad (a chaotic race of frog-like humanoids) were later published in the Fiend Folio monster compendium for the Dungeons & Dragons role-playing game.

His first published short story, "The Boys", appeared in Interzone in 1987. In 1990, Stross was working as a technical author and programmer. In 2000, he began working as a writer full-time, as a technical writer at first, but then became successful as a fiction writer. Between 1994 and 2004, he was also an active writer for the magazine Computer Shopper and was responsible for its monthly Linux column. He stopped writing for the magazine to devote more time to novels. However, he continues to publish freelance articles on the Internet.

A collection of his short stories, Toast: And Other Rusted Futures, was released in 2002; subsequent short stories have been nominated for the Hugo Award, Nebula Award, and other awards. His first novel, Singularity Sky, was published by Ace Books in 2003 and was also nominated for the Hugo Award. His novella The Concrete Jungle (published in The Atrocity Archives) won the Hugo award for its category in 2005. His novel Accelerando won the 2006 Locus Award for Best Science Fiction Novel, was a finalist for the John W. Campbell Memorial Award for Best Science Fiction Novel, and was on the final ballot for the Hugo Award in the best novel category. Glasshouse won the 2007 Prometheus Award and was on the final ballot for the Hugo Award in the best novel category; the German translation Glashaus won the 2009 Kurd-Laßwitz-Preis. His novella Missile Gap won the 2007 Locus Award for best novella, and he was awarded the Edward E. Smith Memorial Award or Skylark at Boskone 2008.

His novel The Atrocity Archives (2004) detailed a British intelligence agency tasked with investigating otherworldly horrors; using ideas similar to those in the RPG book Delta Green (1996), Stross wrote in the afterword to the book: "All I can say in my defence is ... I hadn't heard of Delta Green when I wrote The Atrocity Archive ... I'll leave it at that except to say that Delta Green has come dangerously close to making me pick up the dice again."

Rogue Farm, his 2003 short story, was adapted into an eponymous animated film that debuted in August 2004.

Stross was one of the Guests of Honour at Orbital 2008, and at the British National Science Fiction convention (Eastercon) in March 2008. He was the Author Guest of Honour at the Maryland Regional Science Fiction Convention (Balticon) in May 2009. He was Author Guest of Honour at Fantasticon (Denmark) in August 2009. He was the Guest of Honor at Boskone 48 in Feb 2011.

Cubicle 7 used their Basic Role-Playing license to create The Laundry (2010), based on Stross' writings, wherein agents must contend with both the outer gods and the bureaucracy of the United Kingdom.

In September 2012, Stross released The Rapture of the Nerds, a novel written in collaboration with Cory Doctorow. The two have also together been involved in the Creative Commons licensing and copyright movement. In December 2017 he gave a talk at 34C3 hacker conference.

== Awards ==
Accelerando won the 2006 Locus Award for Best Science Fiction Novel. Missile Gap won the 2007 Locus Award for best novella. The Concrete Jungle (contained in The Atrocity Archives) won the Hugo Award for Best Novella in 2005; Palimpsest, included in Wireless, won the same award in 2010, and Equoid in 2014. Glasshouse won the 2009 Prometheus Award for Best Novel; Stross was a Best Novel finalist in 2009 for Saturn's Children and has been nominated four other times for Iron Sunrise (in 2005), Accelerando (2006), The Revolution Business (2010) and Annihilation Score (2016). The Apocalypse Codex won the 2013 Locus Award for Best Fantasy Novel. Stross's work has also been nominated for a number of other awards, including the John W. Campbell Memorial Award, Arthur C. Clarke Award, and the Hugo Award for Best Novel, as well as the Japanese Seiun Award.

== Personal life ==
Stross is Jewish. He believes himself to be autistic, but does not intend to seek a professional diagnosis.

== Selected bibliography ==
=== The Merchant Princes series ===
- The Family Trade (2004)
- The Hidden Family (2005)
- The Clan Corporate (2006)
- The Merchants' War (2007)
- The Revolution Business (2009)
- The Trade of Queens (2010)
- Empire Games (2017)
- Dark State (2018)
- Invisible Sun (2021)

=== The Laundry Files universe ===
==== The Laundry Files ====
- The Atrocity Archives (2004)
- The Jennifer Morgue (2006)
- Down on the Farm (2008 novelette)
- Equoid (2013 novelette)
- The Fuller Memorandum (2010)
- Overtime (2009 novelette)
- The Apocalypse Codex (2012)
- The Rhesus Chart (2014)
- The Annihilation Score (2015)
- The Nightmare Stacks (2016)
- The Delirium Brief (2017)
- The Labyrinth Index (2018)
- Escape From Yokai Land (2022 novella)
- A Conventional Boy (2025)
- The Regicide Report (2026)

==== Tales of the New Management ====
- Dead Lies Dreaming (2020)
- Quantum of Nightmares (2022)
- Season of Skulls (2023)

=== Halting State series ===
- Halting State (2007)
- Rule 34 (2011)

=== Eschaton series ===
- Singularity Sky (2003)
- Iron Sunrise (2004)

=== Standalone work ===
- A Colder War (2000)
- Accelerando (2005)
- Glasshouse (2006)
- Missile Gap (2006)
