= Eunice =

Eunice may refer to:

== People ==
=== Given name ===
- Eunice (Bible), mother of Timothy
- Eunice (Bosporan queen), wife of Bosporan Roman Client King Tiberius Julius Cotys I
- Eunice, born Heo Soo-yeon, member of Kpop girl group DIA
- Eunice Adabunu, Togolese businesswoman
- Eunice Alberts (1927–2012), American opera singer
- Eunice Eloisae Gibbs Allyn (1847–1916), American correspondent, author, poet
- Eunice Cho (born 1991), American actress and scientist
- Eunice Crowther (1916–1986), British singer, dancer, and choreographer
- Eunice Hale Waite Cobb (1803–1880), American writer, public speaker, activist
- Eunice Caldwell Cowles (1811–1903), American educator
- Eunice Davis (1800–1901), American abolitionist
- Eunice Eichler (1932–2017), New Zealand Salvation Army officer, nurse, midwife and open adoption advocate
- Eunice Eisden (born 1961), Curaçaoan politician
- Eunice Newton Foote (1819–1888), American atmospheric scientist and civil rights advocate
- Eunice Frost (1914–1998), British publisher
- Eunice Gayson (1928–2018), English actress
- Eunice Huthart (born 1966), British stuntwoman
- Eunice Nangueve Inácio (born 1948), Angolan peace activist
- Eunice D. Kinney (1851-1942), Canadian-born American physician
- Eunice Lagusad (born 1998), Filipina actress and vlogger
- Eunice Rivers Laurie (1899–1986), African American nurse
- Eunice Lee (speed skater) (born 2004), American short track speed skater
- Eunice Muñoz (1928–2022), Portuguese actress
- Eunice Murray (1878–1960), Scottish suffrage campaigner, author, folklorist. First Scottish woman to stand in the first election open to women in 1918.
- Eunice Murray Blackmer (1878–1960), American writer, nurse and housekeeper
- Eunice Norton (1908–2005), American pianist
- Eunice Olawale (died 2016), Nigerian Christian female preacher and murder victim
- Eunice Olsen (born 1977), winner of the Miss Singapore Universe contest in 2000 and Singapore version of Vanna White
- Eunice Olumide (born 1987), Scottish model of Nigerian descent
- Eunice Paiva (1929–2018), Brazilian lawyer and humanitarian
- Eunice Parsons (1916–2024), American modernist collage artist and art teacher.
- Eunice Peterson (1900-1988), American geologist, scientific librarian
- Eunice Kennedy Shriver (1921–2009), sister of JFK, founder of the Special Olympics
- Eunice Spry (born 1944), British criminal
- Eunice Sum (born 1988), Kenyan middle-distance runner
- Eunice Kathleen Waymon, birth name of Nina Simone (1933–2003), American singer, pianist and arranger.

=== Greek mythological figures ===
- Eunice (mythology), one of the Nereids
- Eunice, one of the would-be sacrificial victims of the Minotaur
- Eunice, one of the spring nymphs responsible for kidnapping Hylas

== Fictional characters ==
- DC Eunice Noon, Darego's police partner on the British dark-comedy TV drama The End of the F***ing World
- Eunice, a character in the 1895 novel Quo Vadis by Polish author Henryk Sienkiewicz
- Eunice Akinya, a character in the science fiction novels Blue Remembered Earth, On the Steel Breeze and Poseidon's Wake by Alastair Reynolds.
- Eunice Bates, a character from the romantic comedy sports film She's the Man
- Eunice Burns, a character in the 1972 romantic comedy film What's Up, Doc?
- Eunice Harper Higgins, fictional character from The Carol Burnett Show and Mama's Family
- Eunice Dunstan, a character in the Irish soap opera Fair City
- Sister Mary Eunice McKee, a character in American Horror Story: Asylum
- Eunice Stein, a major protagonist from Hotel Transylvania
- Eunice Tate Leitner, a character on the TV sitcom Soap
- Eunice Tolling, a character in the Enid Blyton book The Mystery of the Missing Man
- Eunice, a character in Ben 10: Ultimate Alien

== Places ==
=== Inhabited places ===
- Eunice, Alberta, Westlock County, Alberta, Canada
- Eunice, Arkansas, a ghost town in Chicot County, Arkansas, U.S.
- Eunice, Kentucky, U.S.
- Eunice, Louisiana, U.S.
- Eunice, Missouri, U.S.
- Eunice, New Mexico, U.S.
- Eunice, West Virginia, U.S.

=== Lakes ===
- Eunice Lake (Pierce County, Washington), U.S.
- Eunice Lake (Nova Scotia), lake in Nova Scotia, Canada

== Zoology ==
- Eunice (annelid), a genus in the worm family Eunicidae
- Eunice, a genus of brush-footed butterflies invalidly established by Geyer in 1832; now Eunica

== Other uses ==
- Eunice (film), a 1982 television film based on the Carol Burnett character Eunice Harper Higgins
- Eunice (software), a Unix emulation package for the VAX/VMS operating system
- Eunice High School, St. Landry Parish, Louisiana
- Eunice (storm), a 2022 cyclone over northwestern Europe
- European University for Customised Education, an alliance of European universities
- 185 Eunike, an asteroid

== See also ==
- EUNIS (disambiguation)
- Eunuch (disambiguation)
- Jonah (or Yunis), biblical figure
  - Yunus (surah), in the Quran
- UNECE, European UN body
- UNICE (disambiguation)
- Unix (disambiguation)
