= Ideomancer =

Canadian speculative fiction magazine (2001–2015)

- Editor: Leah Bobet
- Categories: Speculative fiction magazine
- Frequency: Quarterly
- Founded: 2001
- Final issue: 2015
- Country: Canada
- Language: English

Ideomancer was a Canadian quarterly online speculative fiction magazine whose contents included science fiction, fantasy, slipstream, horror, flash fiction and speculative poetry, along with reviews and interviews. The first issue debuted in 2001, and in 2002 the magazine was "rebooted" with new numbering under new editorship. Volume 1 of the current Ideomancer was established in 2002.

Chris Clarke and Mikal Trimm, who were on the original Ideomancer editorial team, edited an ebook anthology called Ideomancer Unbound published by Fictionwise in 2002. It includes stories by Charles Coleman Finlay, Jack Dann, Jeff VanderMeer, Tobias S. Buckell, Deborah Biancotti, Mike Resnick, and Claire McKenna, among others. Cover art is by Cat Sparks.

As of 2019, it appears that the magazine is now defunct. It ceased publication sometime after April 20, 2015, which was the date of the last tweet on their Twitter account.

== Contributing writers ==
In addition to those featured in Ideomancer Unbound, notable authors published by Ideomancer included Nicole Kornher-Stace, Ted Kosmatka, Ruth Nestvold, Christopher Barzak, and Sarah Monette.

== Staff ==
Publisher

- Leah Bobet

Designer & Publisher Emeritus

- Marsha Sisolak

Reviews Editor

- Claire Humphrey

Poetry Editor

- Beth Langford

Production Editor, Designer

- Erin Hoffman

Associate Editors

- Alena McNamara
- Michael R. Colangelo
- Maya Chhabra
- Lillian Wheeler
- Kim Neville

== Awards and recognition ==
Works published in Ideomancer have received the following awards:

2009

- "Sea Change", by Erica L. Satifka, honorable mention, The Year's Best Science Fiction: Twenty-Sixth Annual Collection

2008

- "Deadnauts", by Ted Kosmatka, long list, British Science Fiction Award; honorable mention, The Year's Best Science Fiction: Twenty-Fifth Annual Collection
- "Screamers", by Yoon Ha Lee, honorable mention, The Year's Best Science Fiction: Twenty-Fifth Annual Collection
- "Far Side of the Moon", by Ruth Nestvold, honorable mention, The Year's Best Science Fiction: Twenty-Fifth Annual Collection
- "Things With Sharp Teeth", by Astrid Atkinson, honorable mention, Year's Best Fantasy and Horror
- "Winner", by Kyri Freeman, honorable mention, Year's Best Fantasy and Horror

2007

- "Triple Helix", by Ruth Nestvold, honorable mention, The Year's Best Science Fiction: Twenty-Fourth Annual Collection
- "Nine Lives", by Becca de la Rosa, honorable mention, Year's Best Fantasy and Horror

2006

- "The Sun's Kiss", by Yoon Ha Lee, honorable mention, The Year's Best Science Fiction: Twenty-Third Annual Collection
- "Whale Falls", by Steve Mohan, Jr, honorable mention, The Year's Best Science Fiction: Twenty-Third Annual Collection

2003

- "Mr Neblin's Boy", by Nancy Proctor, honorable mention, Year's Best Fantasy and Horror
- "Horsethieves and Preachermen", by Christopher Rowe, honorable mention, Year's Best Fantasy and Horror

== See also ==
- Science fiction magazine
- Fantasy fiction magazine
- Horror fiction magazine
