= The Ant Men of Tibet and Other Stories =

- First edition
- Author: Edited by David Pringle
- Language: English
- Genre: Science fiction anthology
- Publisher: Big Engine
- Publication date: 2001
- Publication place: United Kingdom
- Media type: Print
- Pages: 255
- ISBN: 1-903468-02-7
- OCLC: 83732776

The Ant Men of Tibet and Other Stories (ISBN 1903468027) is a science fiction anthology edited by David Pringle that was originally published in 2001 in the United Kingdom by Big Engine. It includes ten stories that were all originally published between 1992 and 1998 in the United Kingdom science fiction magazine Interzone, of which Pringle was the editor, along with a three-page introduction by Pringle. The stories are as follows, along with their dates of original publication.

- Stephen Baxter: "The Ant-Men of Tibet" (1995)
- Alastair Reynolds: "Byrd Land Six" (1995)
- Chris Beckett: "The Warrior Half-and-Half" (1995)
- Keith Brooke: "The People of the Sea" (1996)
- Eugene Byrne: "Alfred's Imaginary Pestilence" (1996)
- Nicola Caines: "Civilization" (1997)
- Jayme Lynn Blaschke: "The Dust" (1998)
- Molly Brown: "The Vengeance of Grandmother Wu" (1992)
- Peter T. Garratt: "The Collectivization of Transylvania" (1994)
- Eric Brown: "Vulpheous" (1998)
