= Alastair Reynolds =

Welsh science fiction author (born 1966)

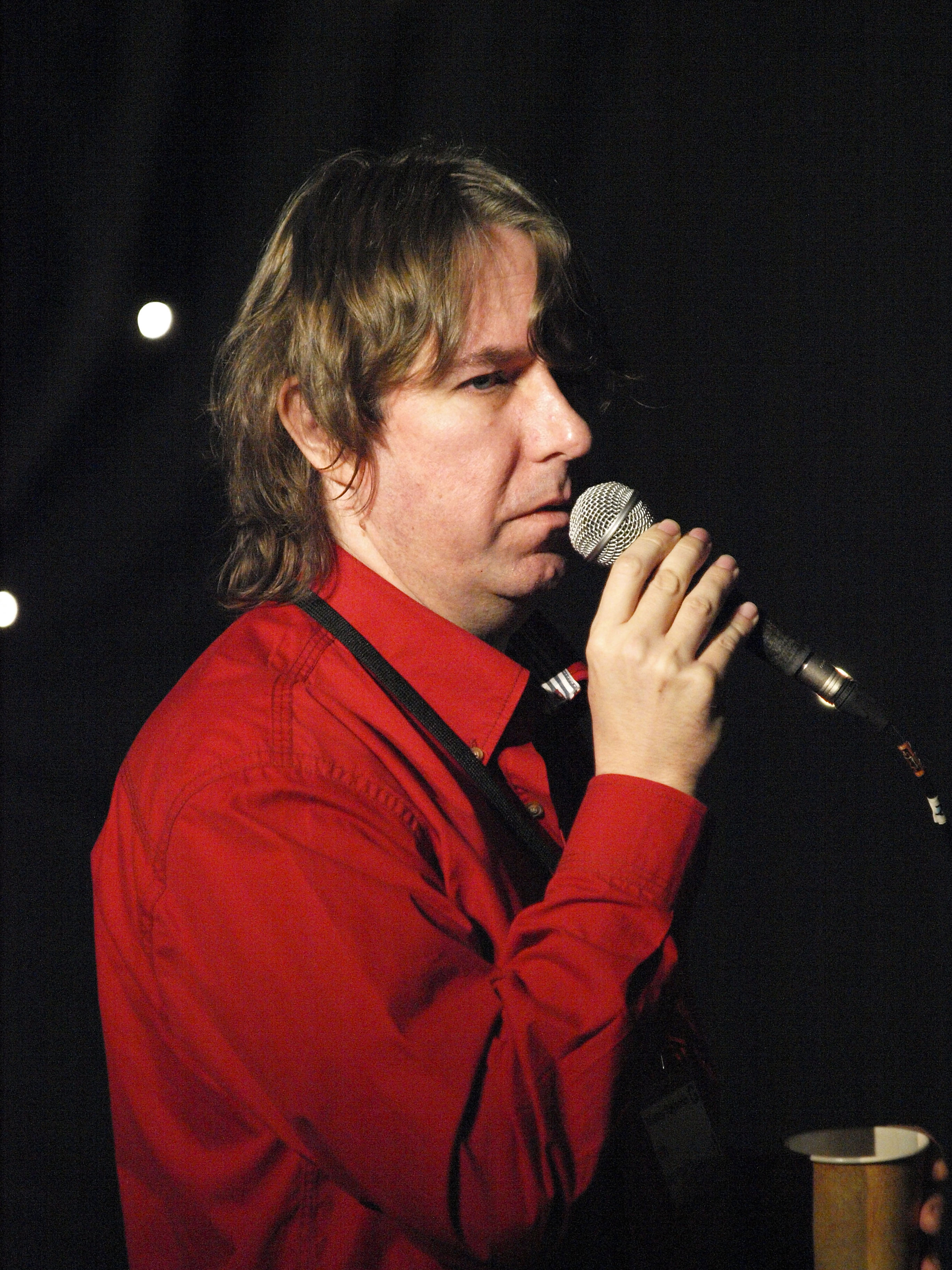
- Reynolds at Eastercon in 2010
- Born: 13 March 1966 (age 60); Barry, South Glamorgan, Wales
- Occupations: Novelist, former research astronomer with the European Space Agency
- Writing career
- Genre: Science fiction
- Website: alastairreynolds.com

Alastair Preston Reynolds (born 13 March 1966) is a Welsh science fiction author. He specialises in hard science fiction and space opera.

== Early life ==
Reynolds was born in Wales and spent his early years in Cornwall before moving back to Wales, and later attended Newcastle University, where he studied physics and astronomy. He subsequently earned a PhD in astrophysics from the University of St Andrews.

== Career ==
Reynolds wrote his first four published science fiction short stories while still a graduate student, in 1989–1991; they appeared in 1990–1992, his first sale being to Interzone. In 1991 Reynolds graduated and moved from Scotland to the Netherlands to work at ESA. He then started spending much of his writing time on a first novel, which eventually turned into Revelation Space, while the few short stories he submitted from 1991 to 1995 were rejected. This ended in 1995 when his story "Byrd Land Six" was published, which he says marked the beginning of a more serious phase of writing. As of 2011 he has published over forty shorter works and nine novels. His works are hard science fiction, typically in the sub-genres of space opera and noir, and reflect his professional expertise with physics and astronomy, included by extrapolating future technologies in terms that are consistent, for the most part, with current science. Reynolds has said he prefers to keep the science in his books to what he personally believes will be possible, and he does not believe faster-than-light travel will ever be possible, but that he adopts science he believes will be impossible when it is necessary for the story. Most of Reynolds's novels contain multiple storylines that originally appear to be completely unrelated, but merge later in the story.

Eight of his novels and several of his short stories take place within one consistent future universe, usually now called the Revelation Space universe after the first novel published in it, although it was originally developed in short stories for several years before the first novel. Although most characters appear in more than one novel, the works set within this future timeline rarely have the same protagonists twice. Often the protagonists from one work belong to a group that is regarded with suspicion or enmity by the protagonists of another work. While a great deal of science fiction reflects either very optimistic or dystopian visions of the human future, Reynolds's future worlds are notable in that human societies have not departed to either positive or negative extremes, but instead are similar to those of today in terms of moral ambiguity and a mixture of cruelty and decency, corruption and opportunity, despite their technology being dramatically advanced.

The Revelation Space series includes eight novels, seven novellas, and six short stories set over a span of several centuries, spanning approximately AD 2205 to 40 000, although the novels are all set in a 300-year period spanning from 2427 to 2727. In this universe, extraterrestrial sentience exists but is elusive, and interstellar travel is primarily undertaken by a class of vessel called a lighthugger which only approaches the speed of light (faster than light travel is possible, but it is so dangerous that no race uses it). Fermi's paradox is explained as resulting from the activities of an inorganic alien race referred to by its victims as the Inhibitors, which exterminates sentient races if they proceed above a certain level of technology. The tetralogy consisting of Revelation Space, Redemption Ark, Absolution Gap, and Inhibitor Phase deals with humanity coming to the attention of the Inhibitors and the resultant war between them.

Century Rain takes place in a future universe independent of the Revelation Space universe and has different rules, such as faster-than-light travel being possible through a system of portals similar to wormholes. Century Rain also departs substantially from Reynolds's previous works, both in having a protagonist who is much closer to the perspective of our real world (in fact he is from a version of our past), serving as a proxy for the reader in confronting the unfamiliarity of the advanced science fiction aspects and in having a much more linear storytelling process. Reynolds's previous protagonists started out fully absorbed in the exoticisms of the future setting and his previous Revelation Space works have several interlinked story threads, not necessarily contemporaneous. According to Reynolds, while Century Rain is a "personal favorite", he has "sworn there will never be a sequel".

Pushing Ice is also a standalone story, with characters from much less distant in the future than in any of his other novels, set into a framework storyline that extends much further into the future of humanity than any of his previous novels. It contains an alternative interpretation of the Fermi paradox: intelligent sentient life in this universe is extremely scarce. Reynolds states that he is "firmly intending" to return to the Pushing Ice setting to write a sequel.

The Prefect marked a return to the Revelation Space universe. Like Chasm City, it is a stand-alone novel within that setting. It is set prior to any of the other Revelation Space novels, though still 200 years after the original human settlement is established on the planet Yellowstone in the Epsilon Eridani system. It was published in the United Kingdom on 2 April 2007. Since its publication, the title of The Prefect has been changed to Aurora Rising to more align with the name of the sequel, Elysium Fire, which was published in 2018, marking the first novel length return to the Revelation Space universe since 2007. This sub-series within the Revelation Space universe is now called The Prefect Dreyfus Emergencies. Reynolds states that he has "tentative plans for three more Dreyfus titles, with an arc that would eventually take him beyond Yellowstone, and then back again."

House of Suns is a standalone novel set in the same universe as his novella "Thousandth Night" from the One Million A.D. anthology. It was released in the UK on 17 April 2008 and in the US on 2 June 2009. Reynolds described it as "Six million years in the future, starfaring clones, tensions between human and robot metacivilisations, King Crimson jokes." As with Pushing Ice, Reynolds also states that he is "firmly intending" to return to the House of Suns setting to write a sequel.

Terminal World, published in March 2010 was described by Reynolds as "a kind of steampunk-tinged planetary romance, set in the distant future". As with Century Rain, Reynolds has said that he does not plan any further work in the universe of Terminal World.

In June 2009 Reynolds signed a new deal, worth £1 million, with his British publishers for ten books to be published over the next ten years.

Between 2012 and 2015 Reynolds released three novels set in a new universe called Poseidon's Children: Blue Remembered Earth (2012), On the Steel Breeze (2014), and Poseidon's Wake (2015). The novels comprise a hard science fiction trilogy dealing with the expansion of the human species into the Solar System and beyond, and the emergence of Africa as a spacefaring, technological super-state.

His Doctor Who novel Harvest of Time was published in June 2013.

His forthcoming work includes "Banish", which will be appearing in Multiverses by Preston Grassmann (ed.) for Titan Publishing.

== Awards and nominations ==
Reynolds's fiction has received three awards and several other nominations. His second novel Chasm City won the 2001 British Science Fiction Award for Best Novel. His short story "Weather" and "Zima Blue" won the Japanese National Science Fiction Convention's Seiun Award for Best Translated Short Fiction. His novels Absolution Gap and The Prefect have also been nominated for previous BSFA awards. Reynolds has been nominated for the Arthur C. Clarke Award three times, for his novels Revelation Space, Pushing Ice and House of Suns. In 2010, he won the Sidewise Award for Alternate History for his short story "The Fixation". His novella Troika made the shortlist for the 2011 Hugo Awards. His Novel Revenger received the 2017 Locus Award for Best Young Adult Book.

== Adaptations ==
On 10 March 2019 Alastair Reynolds announced that his short stories "Zima Blue" and "Beyond the Aquila Rift" had been adapted as part of Netflix's animated anthology Love, Death & Robots. These stories are the first of Reynolds's works to be adapted for TV or film.

== Personal life ==
In 1991, Reynolds moved to Noordwijk in the Netherlands, where he met his wife Josette (who is from France) and worked for the European Space Research and Technology Centre (part of the European Space Agency) until 2004, when he left to pursue writing full-time. He returned to Wales in 2008 and lives near Cardiff.

== Publications ==
=== Novels ===
==== Revelation Space series ====
The Inhibitor Sequence:
1. Revelation Space. London: Gollancz, 2000. ISBN 978-0-44-100942-8
2. Redemption Ark. London: Gollancz, 2002. ISBN 0-575-06879-5
3. Absolution Gap. London: Gollancz, 2003. ISBN 0-575-07434-5
4. Inhibitor Phase. London: Gollancz, 2021. ISBN 978-0-57-509071-2

The Prefect Dreyfus Emergencies:
1. The Prefect/Aurora Rising. London: Gollancz, 2007, ISBN 0-575-07716-6
2. Elysium Fire. London: Gollancz, 2018, ISBN 0-575-09058-8
3. Machine Vendetta. London: Gollancz, 2024, ISBN 978-0-316-46285-3

Standalone:

- Chasm City. London: Gollancz, 2001. ISBN 0-575-06877-9

==== Poseidon's Children Universe ====
1. Blue Remembered Earth. London: Gollancz, 2012, ISBN 0-575-08827-3
2. On the Steel Breeze. London: Gollancz, 2013, ISBN 0-575-09045-6
3. Poseidon's Wake. London: Gollancz, 2015, ISBN 978-0-575-09049-1

==== Doctor Who (Third Doctor) ====
- Harvest of Time. BBC Books, 2013, ISBN 978-1-849-90418-6

==== Other ====
- Century Rain. London: Gollancz, 2004. ISBN 0-575-07436-1
- Pushing Ice. London: Gollancz, 2005. ISBN 0-575-07438-8
- House of Suns. London: Gollancz, 2008, ISBN 0-575-07717-4
- Terminal World. London: Gollancz, 2010, ISBN 0-575-07718-2
- The Medusa Chronicles (with Stephen Baxter). London: Gollancz, 2016, ISBN 978-1473210189
- Eversion. London: Gollancz, 2022 ISBN 978-0575090767
- Halcyon Years. London: Gollancz, 2025 ISBN 978-1399611763
- Merlin's Way. New York: Hachette Book Group, 2027 ISBN 978-0-3166-071-17

=== Young adult novels ===
==== Revenger Universe ====
1. Revenger. London: Gollancz, 2016, ISBN 978-057-509053-8
2. Shadow Captain. London: Gollancz, 2019, ISBN 978-057-509063-7
3. Bone Silence. London: Gollancz, 2020, ISBN 978-057-509067-5

=== Collections ===
- Diamond Dogs, Turquoise Days. London: Gollancz, 2003. ISBN 0-575-07526-0
  - Diamond Dogs – Originally published as a chapbook from PS Publishing (2001, ISBN 1-902880-27-7); reprinted in Infinities (2002), Peter Crowther, ed.
  - Turquoise Days – Originally published as a chapbook from Golden Gryphon (2002, no ISBN); reprinted in The Year's Best Science Fiction: Twentieth Annual Collection (2003, ISBN 0-312-30860-4), Gardner Dozois, ed.; and in Best of the Best Volume 2: 20 Years of the Year's Best Short Science Fiction Novels (2007, ISBN 0-312-36342-7), Gardner Dozois, ed.
- Zima Blue and Other Stories. San Francisco, CA: Night Shade Books, 2006. ISBN 1-59780-058-9 (Contains nearly all of the author's non-Revelation Space universe stories at the time of publication). Reprinted as Zima Blue and Other Stories. London: Gollancz, 2009. ISBN 0-575-08405-7 (British edition has additional stories 1) Cardiff Afterlife; 2) Minla's Flowers; 3) Digital to Analogue; 4) Everlasting) not included in the original publication. Introduction by Paul J. McAuley.)
  - "Enola" – Originally published in Interzone #54 (December 1991).
  - "Digital to Analogue" – Originally published in In Dreams (1992), Paul J. McAuley and Kim Newman, eds.., Limited Edition
  - "Spirey and the Queen" – Originally published in Interzone #108 (June 1996); reprinted in Future War (1999, ISBN 0-441-00639-6), Gardner Dozois and Jack Dann, eds..; and in The Space Opera Renaissance (2006), David G. Hartwell & Kathryn Cramer, eds.; and posted free online at Infinity Plus
  - "Angels of Ashes" – Originally published in Asimov's Science Fiction (July 1999).
  - "Merlin's Gun" – Originally published in Asimov's Science Fiction (May 2000).; and in The Mammoth Book of Extreme Science Fiction (2006, ISBN 978-0-7867-1727-9), Mike Ashley, ed.
  - "Hideaway" – Originally published in Interzone #157 (July 2000).
  - "The Real Story" – Originally published in Mars Probes (2002), Peter Crowther, ed..
  - "Everlasting" – Originally published in Interzone #193 (Spring 2004).
  - "Beyond the Aquila Rift" – Originally published in Constellations (2005), Peter Crowther, ed.; reprinted in The Year's Best Science Fiction: Twenty-Third Annual Collection (2006, ISBN 0-312-35334-0), Gardner Dozois, ed.; and in Year's Best SF 11 (2006, ISBN 978-0-06-087341-7), David G. Hartwell and Kathryn Cramer, eds..
  - "Zima Blue" – Originally published in Postscripts # 4 (Summer 2005); reprinted in The Year's Best Science Fiction: Twenty-Third Annual Collection (2006, ISBN 0-312-35334-0), Gardner Dozois, ed..
  - "Signal to Noise" – Originally published in Zima Blue and Other Stories, (2006); reprinted in The Year's Best Science Fiction: Twenty-Fourth Annual Collection (2006, ISBN 978-0-312-36335-2), Gardner Dozois, ed.
  - "Cardiff Afterlife" – Originally published in the reprint of Zima Blue and Other Stories
  - "Understanding Space and Time" – Originally published in a limited edition of 400 copies for the Novacon 35 Sci Fi convention; reprinted in Science Fiction: The Best of the Year, 2006 Edition (2006, ISBN 978-0-8095-5649-6), Rich Horton, ed.; and in Science Fiction: The Very Best of 2005 (2006), Jonathan Strahan, ed.
  - "Minla's Flowers" – Originally published in The New Space Opera (2007, ISBN 978-0-06-084675-6), Gardner Dozois and Jonathan Strahan, eds.
- Galactic North. London: Gollancz, 2006. ISBN 0-575-07910-X (Contains all novellas and short stories in the Revelation Space universe up to 2006, except those in Diamond Dogs, Turquoise Days)
  - "Great Wall of Mars" – Originally published in Spectrum SF #1 (February 2000); reprinted in The Year's Best Science Fiction: Eighteenth Annual Collection (2001, ISBN 0-312-27465-3), Gardner Dozois, ed.
  - "Glacial" – Originally published in Spectrum SF #5 (March 2001); reprinted in The Year's Best Science Fiction: Nineteenth Annual Collection (2002, ISBN 0-312-28879-4), Gardner Dozois, ed.; and in Year's Best SF 7 (2002, ISBN 0-06-106143-3), David G. Hartwell & Kathryn Cramer, eds.
  - "Weather" – Originally published in Galactic North (2006)
  - "Grafenwalder's Bestiary" – Originally published in Galactic North (2006)
  - "Nightingale" – Originally published in Galactic North (2006); reprinted in The Year's Best Science Fiction: Twenty-Fourth Annual Collection (2006, ISBN 978-0-312-36335-2), Gardner Dozois, ed.
  - "Dilation Sleep" – Originally published in Interzone #39 (September 1990).
  - "A Spy in Europa" – Originally published in Interzone #120 (June 1997); reprinted in The Year's Best Science Fiction: Fifteenth Annual Collection (1998, ISBN 0-312-19033-6), Gardner Dozois, ed.; and posted free online at Infinity Plus
  - "Galactic North" – Originally published in Interzone #145 (July 1999); reprinted in Space Soldiers (2001, ISBN 978-0-441-00824-7), Jack Dann and Gardner Dozois, eds.; and in The Year's Best Science Fiction: Seventeenth Annual Collection (2000, ISBN 0-312-26417-8), Gardner Dozois, ed.; and in Hayakawa's SF magazine.
- Deep Navigation. Framingham, MA: NESFA Press, 2010. ISBN 978-1-886778-90-0 (Limited edition containing stories either not included in, or published after the earlier collections. Introduction by Stephen Baxter.)
  - "Nunivak Snowflakes" – Originally published in Interzone #36 (June 1990)..
  - "Byrd Land Six" – Originally published in Interzone #96 (June 1995); reprinted in The Ant Men of Tibet and Other Stories (2001, ISBN 1-903468-02-7), David Pringle, ed.
  - "On the Oodnadatta" – Originally published in Interzone #128 (February 1998)..
  - "Stroboscopic" – Originally published in Interzone #134 (August 1998); reprinted in Dangerous Games (2007, ISBN 978-0-441-01490-3), Gardner Dozois and Jack Dann, eds.
  - "Viper" – Originally published in Asimov's Science Fiction (December 1999)..
  - "Fresco" – Originally published in the UNESCO Courier (May 2001)..
  - "Feeling Rejected" – Originally published in the journal Nature (2005)..
  - "Tiger, Burning" – Originally published in Forbidden Planets (2006, ISBN 0-7564-0330-8), Peter Crowther, ed.; reprinted in Year's Best SF 12 (2007, ISBN 978-0-06-125208-2), David G. Hartwell and Kathryn Cramer, eds..
  - "The Sledge-Maker's Daughter" – Originally published in Interzone No. 209 (April 2007); reprinted in The Year's Best Science Fiction: Twenty-Fifth Annual Collection (2006, ISBN 978-0-312-37860-8), Gardner Dozois, ed..
  - "Soirée" – Originally published in Celebration: Commemorating the 50th Anniversary of the British Science Fiction Association (March 2008), Ian Whates, ed..
  - "The Star-Surgeon's Apprentice" – Originally published in The Starry Rift (April 2008), Jonathan Strahan, ed..
  - "Fury" – Originally published in Eclipse Two: New Science Fiction and Fantasy, (November 2008)..
  - The Fixation – Originally published in a Finnish language, Hannun basaarissa a limited edition booklet of about 200 copies in tribute to Hannu Blommila in Finland (2007); reprinted in The Solaris Book of New Science Fiction, Volume 3 (February 2009), George Mann, ed..
  - "The Receivers" – Originally published in Other Earths (April 2009), Nick Gevers and Jay Lake, eds.
  - "Monkey Suit" – Originally published in Death Ray #20 (July 2009) (a Revelation Space story).
- Beyond the Aquila Rift. London: Gollancz, 2016. ISBN 978-1473216358
  - "Great Wall of Mars" – previously collected in Galactic North
  - "Weather" – previously collected in Galactic North
  - "Beyond the Aquila Rift" – previously collected in Zima Blue and Other Stories
  - "Minla's Flowers" – previously collected in Zima Blue and Other Stories
  - "Zima Blue" – previously collected in Zima Blue and Other Stories
  - "Fury" – previously collected in Deep Navigation
  - "The Star Surgeon's Apprentice" – previously collected in Deep Navigation
  - "The Sledge-Maker's Daughter" – previously collected in Deep Navigation
  - Diamond Dogs – previously collected in Diamond Dogs, Turquoise Days
  - Thousandth Night – originally published in One Million A.D. (2005), Gardner Dozois, ed.
  - Troika – originally published in Godlike Machines (2010), Jonathan Strahan, ed.;
  - "Sleepover" – originally published in The Mammoth Book of Apocalyptic SF (May 2010), Mike Ashley, eds.
  - "Vainglory" – originally published in Edge of Infinity (December 2012), Jonathan Strahan, ed.
  - "Trauma Pod" – originally published in Armored (April 2012), John Joseph Adams, ed
  - "The Last Log of the Lachrimosa" – originally published in Subterranean Online (July 2014) (a Revelation Space story)
  - "The Water Thief" – originally published in Arc 1.1 / The Future Aways Wins (February 2012), Sumit Paul-Choudhury, Simon Ings, eds.
  - "The Old Man and the Martian Sea" – originally published in Life on Mars (April 2011), Jonathan Strahan, ed.
  - "In Babelsberg" – originally published in Reach for Infinity (May 2014), Jonathan Strahan, ed.
- Belladonna Nights and Other Stories. Subterranean Press, October 2021.
  - "Belladonna Nights" – originally published in The Weight of Words, Subterranean Press (December 2017), Dave McKean and William Schafer eds. (a House of Suns story)
  - "Different Seas" – originally published in Twelve Tomorrows, MIT Press (May 2018), Wade Rush ed.
  - "For the Ages" – originally published in Solaris Rising: The New Solaris Book of Science Fiction (November 2011), Ian Whates, ed.
  - "Visiting Hours" - originally published in Megatech: Technology in 2050 (2017)
  - "Holdfast" – originally published in Extrasolar, PS Publishing (August 2017), Nick Gevers ed.
  - "The Lobby" – originally published in Memoryville Blues (Postscripts #30/31), Peter Crowther & Nick Gevers, ed.
  - "A Map of Mercury" – originally published in The Lowest Heaven (June 2013)
  - "Magic Bone Woman" - originally published in Consequences (2011)
  - "Providence" – originally published in 2001: An Odyssey in Words, Newcon Press (March 2018), Ian Whates and Tom Hunter eds.
  - "Wrecking Party" – originally published in Dead Man's Hand: An Anthology of the Weird West (May 2014), John Joseph Adams, ed.
  - "Sixteen Questions for Kamala Chatterjee" - originally published in Bridging Infinity, Solaris Press (October 2016), Jonathan Strahan ed.
  - "Death's Door" – originally published in Infinity's End, Solaris Press (July 2018), Jonathan Strahan ed.
  - "A Murmuration" – originally published in Interzone (Mar–Apr 2015)
  - "Open and Shut" – originally published online by Gollancz (January 2018) (a Revelation Space story).
  - "Plague Music"- originally published in Belladonna Nights (2021) (a Revelation Space story)
  - "Night Passage" – Published in Infinite Stars, Titan Books (October 2017), Bryan Thomas Schmidt ed. (a Revelation Space story)

=== Novellas ===
- "Thousandth Night", ISBN 978-1596062597 (with "Minla's Flowers") – Originally published in One Million A.D. (2005), Gardner Dozois, ed.; available in electronic format from Subterranean Press.
- "The Six Directions of Space", ISBN 978-1596061842 – Originally published in Galactic Empires (September 2007), Gardner Dozois, ed.
- "Troika", ISBN 978-1596063761 – Originally published in Godlike Machines (2010), Jonathan Strahan, ed.;
- "Slow Bullets" (2015), ISBN 978-1616961930
- "The Iron Tactician" (2016), ISBN 978-1910935309
- "Permafrost" (2019), ISBN 9781250303561
- "The Dagger in Vichy" (2025), ISBN 9781645242802

=== Uncollected short fiction ===
- "The Big Hello" – Originally published in German translation in a convention program.
- "The Manastodon Broadcasts" – Originally published in Aberrant Dreams I: The Awakening (December 2008), Joe Dickerson, Ernest G. Saylor and Lonny Harper, eds.
- "Scales" – Originally published in The Guardian (2009); and posted free online at Lightspeed.
- "Lune and the Red Empress" with Liz Williams, originally published in the 2010 Eastercon souvenir booklet.
- "At Budokan" – Originally published in Shine (March 2010), Jetse de Vries, ed.
- "Ascension Day" – Originally published in Voices from the Past (May 2011), reprinted in The Year's Best Science Fiction: Twenty-Ninth Annual Collection (2012, ISBN 978-1-250-00354-6), Gardner Dozois, ed.
- "Sad Kapteyn" – Originally published online by the School of Physics and Astronomy, Queen Mary University of London
- "Remainers" – Originally published in Tales from the Edge: Escalation, Spiral Arm Studios (July 2017), Stephen Gaskell ed.
- "Polished Performance" – Published in Made To Order: Robots and Revolution, Solaris Press (March 2020), Jonathan Strahan ed.
- "Things to Do In Deimos When You're Dead" - Published in Asimov's Science Fiction (September/October 2022)
- "End User" – Published online on Medium (June 2023)
- "Detonation Boulevard" – Published online in Tor.com (July 2023)
- "Lottie and the River" – Published in New Scientist (16/23 December 2023)
- "The Scurlock Compendium" – Published in To the Stars and Back: Stories in Honour of Eric Brown (2024, ISBN 9781914953798)
- "Meet Tomorrow" – Published as a commission for Zurich Insurance (December 2025)

=== Essays, reporting and other contributions ===
- Reynolds, Alastair (2015). "Gerry Anderson saw the future". Book Club. SciFiNow. 104: 96–97.

== See also ==
- Night Shade Books
- Revelation Space universe
