= House of Sun =

House of Sun may refer to:

- The imperial Sun clan of Eastern Wu (222–280) and its precursor in China's Three Kingdoms period
- "House of Sun", one of the two tracks on the 2004 album Seadrum/House of Sun by Boredoms

== See also ==
- Sun House (disambiguation)
- The House of the Sun (disambiguation)
- House of Suns, 2008 novel by Alastair Reynolds
