= UNICE =

UNICE or Unice may refer to:

- Union of Industrial and Employers' Confederations of Europe, (now BusinessEurope), a Brussels-based industry association
- Université de Nice Sophia Antipolis, a subsumed public university in France
- U.N.I.C.E., a character in Bibleman, an American television series
- Únice, a municipality and village in the Czech Republic
- Josh Unice (born 1989) U.S. ice hockey player

== See also ==
- Ice (disambiguation)
- Eunice (disambiguation)
- Eunuch (disambiguation)
- Unix (disambiguation)
  - Unix, whose plural is "Unices"
  - Unix-like operating systems, sometimes referred to as "Unices"
  - List of Unices, of Unix systems
- University of Nice Sophia Antipolis, the university in Nice, France
- Digging out of ice
- Deicing
- UNECE
