= Shadow Captain =

Shadow Captain may refer to:

- Shadow Captain (song), a song by Crosby, Stills & Nash
- Shadow Captain (novel), a 2019 novel by Alastair Reynolds
