= Science Fiction Book Club original anthology series =

The Science Fiction Book Club original anthology series is a series of books of all-new short fiction(s), mainly at novella length, typically including six novellas per book, commissioned and published by the Science Fiction Book Club, and edited by a variety of editors. The series ended in 2009, with Godlike Machines being the last of the anthologies.

== Volumes ==
- One Million A.D., edited by Gardner Dozois (2005)
- Escape from Earth, edited by Gardner Dozois & Jack Dann (2005)
- Down These Dark Spaceways, edited by Mike Resnick (2005)
- Forbidden Planets, edited by Marvin Kaye (2006)
- Galactic Empires, edited by Gardner Dozois (2007)
- Alien Crimes, edited by Mike Resnick (2007)
- Godlike Machines, edited by Jonathan Strahan (2009)
