= Terminal World =

2010 novel by Alastair Reynolds

- First edition cover
- Author: Alastair Reynolds
- Language: English
- Genre: Science fiction
- Publisher: Gollancz, Ace Books
- Publication date: March 2010 (Gollancz ed.); June 2010 (Ace Books ed.)
- Publication place: United Kingdom
- Media type: Print (Hardback)
- Pages: 487 (Ace Books ed.) 490 (Gollancz ed.)
- ISBN: 978-0-575-07718-8
- OCLC: 428776527

Terminal World is a 2010 science fiction novel by Welsh author Alastair Reynolds. It is a standalone novel set in the distant future, which chronicles the journey of Quillon, a pathologist forced into exile. The Gollancz hardcover edition of the book was published in March 2010 in the United Kingdom. The Ace Books hardcover edition was published in June 2010 in the United States.

== Setting ==
The novel is set in an unspecified distant future. Human civilization is largely confined to the city of Spearpoint, home to more than 30 million people. Spearpoint (colloquially called the Godscraper) is built on the surface of a vast artificial spire made of a nameless, nearly impermeable black substance. Both Spearpoint and its surroundings are divided into zones: regions of space-time that exist at different energy states. Different zones support different levels of technology, and humans require periodic drug treatments to survive outside their native zone. Within Spearpoint itself, individual zones designate different precincts within the city; further away, they become much larger, with some on the opposite side of the world encompassing entire geographic regions. Spearpoint consists of six precincts of ascending technological advancement: Horsetown, Steamville, Neon Heights, Circuit City, the cybertowns/cyborg polities, and the Celestial Levels. Deep inside Spearpoint's spire is a theorized core, called the Mire or the Eye of God, near which the zones become exponentially smaller.

Beyond Spearpoint is the Outzone, the rest of the world. The terrain is primarily a vast, sparsely forested plain crisscrossed by ancient roads, disused railways, and the semaphore towers responsible for relaying communication between Spearpoint and the towns. Bodies of water like the Long Gash and the Old Sea are rapidly receding, and the world itself is becoming colder. In this harsh land, travelers must contend with Carnivorgs, cybernetic canine-like creatures who prey on people for their brain tissue, and the Skullboys, land pirates that create havoc and anarchy for the sheer thrill of it and because of imperfect zone drugs. These are obtained from the Carnivorgs in return for victims to be robbed of their brain tissue.

Opposing the Skullboys is Swarm, a conglomeration of several hundred airships that formerly served as Spearpoint's military arm, before splitting from the city over a thousand years previously. They have retained a highly militaristic way of life, though with elements of democracy, voting by flags (one per airship) on important matters. They view Spearpointers with great suspicion, possible spies and saboteurs. Other inhabitants of the Outzone they view as just inferior, apart from the Skullboys who are bitter foes. There is internal division about how best to deal with them.

== Plot ==
The plot begins when an "angel", a posthuman from the Celestial levels at Spearpoint's peak, falls to Neon Heights, further down the spire. The clean-up crew that finds it delivers it to Quillon, one of the zone's pathologists. It is revealed that Quillon was part of a secret angel project to see if angels could be altered to survive in Spearpoint's lower levels. The dying angel tells Quillon that certain factions amongst the angels are searching for him to obtain further information about the results of this project.

Quillon seeks advice from his old ally, Fray, who tells him that he needs to leave Spearpoint if he is to survive in the foreseeable future. He summons Meroka, one of his extraction specialists, to help Quillon out of the city. Quillon and Meroka escape the city, pursued by "Ghouls"- angels with similar, but less sophisticated, inter-zonal modifications that allow them to survive in lower state zones for short periods of time.

They find out that the zones had rearranged themselves totally overnight in what is called a "zone storm". They look to Spearpoint and see that all the lights have gone out, indicating the entire city has been affected by the storm. They venture on and run into an overturned carriage with several bodies having been consumed by the vorgs, carnivorous cyborgs, that harvest brain tissue to feed on. Soon Quillon and Meroka run into a Skullboy caravan and find two prisoners who they release. The Skullboys take them all hostage, then the vorgs turn up and demand fresh meat in return for making drugs for the Skullboys. Meroka offers herself up to the vorgs but before she is harvested the vorg behind her is killed by members from Swarm.

Swarm airmen kill off the remaining Skullboys and Vorg and pronounce Quillons group to be "clients of Swarm". They are taken aboard one of the hundred and fifty airships that make up the entity of Swarm. The gang get taken back to Swarm's HQ and are taken to see the leader Riccasso. Meroka finds out that Quillon is an angel and as she had a chequered past with the angels, no longer speaks to him. Ricasso tells Quillon about his research into finding a complete cure for zone sickness, which would allow people to cross zone boundaries at will.

The two prisoners that Quillon and Meroka released are mother Kalis and daughter Nimcha who both bear the Tectomancer birthmark. However Kalis' birthmark upon closer inspection turns out to be a tattoo used to divert hatred and prejudice from her daughter onto herself. Quillon takes great measures to hide their identity from Swarm because they are as prejudiced as all the other outerland peoples about these "witches". Eventually Ricasso finds out and agrees to keep it from the rest of Swarm as it would cause unrest with the airmen.

Quillon finds out that the serum that Ricasso had been preparing before serves as an effective anti-zonal medication. Quillon asks Ricasso and a few of his most trusted allies to head back to Spearpoint to help out the millions of needy and sick people still living there. After a tense discussion it is decided that the issue will be put to the flags to see who is for or against the idea. Surprisingly the majority say that they are behind the plans, even some of Ricasso's most staunch enemies. Preparations are made to head out to Spearpoint and the serum is prepared for dilution. When one of the scouts comes back after a successful battle with a Skullboy ship they bring back intelligence and maps that the previously dead land of the Bane has had a zone realignment and using the route could be a massive short cut. Ricasso decides that this is the best plan of action even though it is highly dangerous.

In the vorg cage room where Ricasso's lab is Quillon is hard at work preparing the serum for dilution and he gets surprised by Spatha who has a gun aimed at Quillon's head. Spatha demands that Quillon release a vorg to make everyone think that bringing him aboard and letting him loose in the laboratory was a bad idea. However the vorg runs through the ship and causes mayhem, releases the other vorgs in the cages and manages to kill 4 people before Nimcha uses her powers to cause a small zone tremor so the ship is reverted to a lower state zone, killing off the highly advanced vorg. Spatha is arrested and sentenced to death by firing squad.

The journey across the newly opened short cut over the Bane is uneventful at first, until they come across a metallic object in the distance. The Painted Lady, Curtana's ship on which Quillon and Meroka are living, is instructed to scope out the object whilst the rest of the Swarm carries on its normal course. The object turns out to be a plane, unusual because the Bane is supposedly uninhabitable by anything other than single celled organisms and dirt. Soon they come across more planes, then prop-planes then bi and tri planes until they get to gliders. Many of them are marked with a red rectangle with one large star and four small stars. (This means nothing to them, but would be consistent with it being the flag of China in our own era.)

After this they see on the horizon what appears to be a very similar object to Spearpoint, but with no signs that anyone ever lived on its surface. Ricasso and Quillon elect to take a closer look at the building in a balloon as normal airships can't reach the top of the object. They see that unlike Spearpoint this object was never colonised as thoroughly and is hollow with a hole at the top.

Once they get close to Spearpoint they intercept semaphore lines that tell of zone changes on the boundary of their destination which are so low state it would inhibit powered flight. A plan is made to come in steep, nurse the engines as long as possible and finally glide into Spearpoint. This is complicated by the pockets of resistance put up by Skullboys in balloons. There is a fierce battle into which Quillon and Meroka are enlisted, many of the guns and engines fail as they cross into the lower state zones but eventually they triumph.

They reach Spearpoint and land in the middle of a sea of people. They are met with Tulwar's militia force that escort Quillon and Meroka to the Red Dragon Bathhouse. They start to unload the crates of Serum-15 and a stray Skullboy rocket sets fire to the tail of the Painted Lady. Luckily most of the airmen and Curtana make it off the ship with little more than burns but some of the medicine was lost in the hurry to offload it. At the bathhouse Quillon, Meroka, Kalis, and Nimcha talk to Tulwar about the distribution of the serum and about getting Nimcha close to the Mire, inside of Spearpoint, which has been calling to her through her dreams and asking her to heal it. Tulwar agrees to let them travel to the nearest tunnel entrance and suggests that they stay the night to rest after their chaotic journey. The next day they head to the Pink Peacock and enter the tunnel system with Meroka leading them. She smells something amiss with Tulwar's plan and thinks that they are being set up so that Tulwar can remain in power of Spearpoint and prolong the chaos to reign supreme. She diverts from the planned path and they eventually get caught up by Kargas, Tulwar's head of militia, and get into a fire fight. At that point Fray and Malkin turn up with powerful guns and mow down the assailants. Tulwar had informed the party that Fray was dead but this is just another of his deceptions. After talking to Fray they get lead to meet with the Mad Machines, long thought to be an urban myth about the even more mythical tunnel systems by many living in Spearpoint. They meet with Juggernaught and plead Nimcha's case and it agrees to take them to see the others. They travel along without Meroka and Malkin who leave to sort out Tulwar and meet with The Final One. She informs Nimcha that she must take a place in the chamber beside the other tectomancers so they can heal the Mire.

After the party leaves Nimcha and Fray down in the chamber they decide to take revenge on Tulwar for his deceptions. They hide in crates of the serum and Meroka shoots Tulwar several times, disabling him by puncturing his steam pipes. Quillon talks to Tulwar about his deceptions then spits up blood and passes out. He has internal bleeding from a shot to his back and is on his death bed. He is informed that an angel was sent out to meet with the rest of the Swarm, which had hung back before the zone boundaries, and has told them that they have allies in the celestial levels. Quillon realises that these are the same allies that warned him about his imminent execution and Curtana orders him to travel with Meroka to the Celestial Levels in hopes of saving his life and finding allies to take Spearpoint back from the Skullboys and the unallied angels.

The book finishes with Curtana and Agraffe wondering what changes would befall the planet and Spearpoint after Nimcha has finished healing the mire and wonder what the Mad Machines were talking about when they mentioned Earthgate and going into the planet to reach the stars.

== 'Earth' ==
While the world the story takes place on is referred to only as "Earth" throughout the novel, it is gradually revealed through anecdotes and remarks by the characters that the world Spearpoint is on is not Earth as we know it. It fits quite well with the world being a post-apocalyptic terraformed Mars that has somehow lost or confused its history.

Near the beginning of chapter 6, at night time, the book describes celestial features specifically referring to Venus in the sky as well as "the golden eye of Mars shone balefully in the east". Either this was an oversight of the author, a deliberate point to mislead readers or, as some have suggested, a misunderstanding or confusion of history lost to time.

Geographical features such as the Daughters, three mountains that were "punched in a sloping line with the regularity of bullet holes", and the Mother Goddess, "the tallest of all mountains, so tall and wide that from its foot slopes it no longer seemed a mountain, but merely a gentle steepening of the ground", correspond to the Tharsis Montes and Olympus Mons, respectively. One character mentions to another character that they are traveling through a canyon system called the "Night Maze", having already passed over Long Gash. This name corresponds to Noctis Labyrinthus, which lies to the west of Valles Marineris. Navigation is affected as well, Swarm airships use navigational gyroscopes, with no mention of compasses, as Mars has no significant magnetic field.

One character tells a story about the founding of the world's two other cities, Fortune's Landing and Soul's Rest, both known to be older than even Spearpoint. According to the story, the cities were founded by twin princes who hailed from a faraway kingdom. One brother, named Spirit, founded Soul's Rest, while the other brother, Opportunity, founded Fortune's Landing. This refers to the Mars Exploration Rover mission.

The ages of characters, given in years, also imply that either they mature much more quickly than present-day humans, or that the year is much longer than 365 days (which if the planet is Mars will be the case since a Mars year is 687 Earth days). It is said that people once lived to be twice as old as now, which makes Mars such a good fit. Additionally, several references to time referring to “Twelve months to a year” indicate that the local year is longer than the twelve months of a terrestrial year. There are also references to people in the past being similar in size to children; this could indicate that the lower Martian gravity has led all humans to be taller than their Earth-based ancestors.

Several times during the novel, distant historical/mythical events are referred to as "before the moon split in two" hinting at Mars' two moons.

There are references throughout the novel to the world growing colder and the air thinner, which fits with a terraformed Mars whose atmosphere isn't being maintained. One of the main characters, Ricasso, mentions that he has done calculations and that the atmosphere is "like a bucket with a leak in it".

Another factor is where, toward the end of the book powerful machines which have a major part to play refer to the location as Earthgate "this ancient, once-dead world" and distinguish it from Earth itself. One character pick up partially on this, saying "What the hell is Earthgate anyway? Why doesn't she just say Earth and be done with it?"

At one point in the text, Mars is explicitly referenced as visible in the night sky, just before one of the two halves of the moon appears.

In an interview Reynolds confirmed that the story is set on Mars.

== Development ==
Reynolds announced on April 30, 2008 that he was writing a new novel which he described as "SF ... weird, and it doesn't have spaceships". He elaborated further in an interview in early 2009, saying that Terminal World was a steampunk-influenced novel about "the last human city, a vast vertical structure called Spearpoint", a city divided into several semi-autonomous "zones" of differing technological levels. The story focuses on the adventures of Quillon, a pathologist forced into exile from Spearpoint, and involved a "terrible catastrophe" befalling the city. A diagram showing the plotting of the novel's structure was featured on his website in an article describing his writing methods.

Reviews have compared the novel to Vernor Vinge's Zones of Thought series, which also takes place in a universe split into areas where different levels of technology are possible. Reynolds has described the novel as being influenced by Arthur C. Clarke's The City and the Stars, which is also set on a world where most of the population is confined to one city, as well as films depicting dystopian and post-apocalyptic worlds such as Delicatessen, Dark City and Mad Max. Reynolds has repeatedly said in interviews and on his website that although he did consider incorporating Terminal World's material into a series while planning it, the novel is complete in its own right and he does not anticipate writing a sequel.

In 2013, Reynolds published on his blog three scenes in Quillon's life originally planned for the novel but cut in the later stages of editing.

== Reception ==
Eric Brown reviewed the book for The Guardian and concluded "The novel works as a rousing adventure in a wildly original setting, and Quillon's transformation from cold loner to caring human being is effectively charted."
