= The House of the Sun =

House of the Sun may refer to:

== Locations ==
- Beth Shemesh (Hebrew "house of the sun"), name of several biblical places
- Haleakalā (Hawaiian "house of the sun"), volcano in Maui
  - The House of the Sun Visitor Center, Crater Historic District, Hawaii
- Haleʻākala (Hawaiian "house of the sun"), historic house in Honolulu
- House of the Sun, Cusco, ruined Inca temple, now site of St. Dominic monastery
- House of the Sun, 2 rue Saint-Georges Place de la Trinité

== Concepts ==
- House of the Sun, Leo (zodiac) in astrology
- House of the Sun, Urban planning in ancient Egypt

== Arts and entertainment ==
- The House of the Sun (opera) (Auringon talo), 1990 Finnish-language chamber opera by Einojuhani Rautavaara
- House of the Sun (manga) (Taiyō no Ie), 2010 Japanese shōjo manga series by Ta'amo
- The House of the Sun (film) (Дом Cолнца), 2010 Russian film about hippies in the Soviet Union
- To the House of the Sun, narrative poem by Tim Miller (poet)
- House of the Sun, a Shadowrun novel by Nigel Findley

== See also ==
- Sun House (disambiguation)
- House of Sun (disambiguation)
- House of Suns
- The House of the Rising Sun
