= Sun House =

Sun House can be:

- The Sun House, Grace Hudson's 1911 redwood Craftsman bungalow home, is adjacent to the Grace Hudson Museum in Ukiah, California
- Dover Sun House in Dover, Massachusetts
- The Sun House, a Grade II* listed Modernist house in Hampstead, London
- House of Suns: a 2008 science fiction novel
- Sunhouse: short-lived Nottingham based band

== See also ==
- House of Sun (disambiguation)
- The House of the Sun (disambiguation)
- Son House
