= Eunuch (disambiguation) =

A eunuch is a man who has been castrated.

Eunuch or Eunuchs may also refer to:

- Eunuch (TV series), a 1980 Hong Kong TV series
- Eunuch (film), a 1986 South Korean film
- The Eunuch, a 1971 Hong Kong film directed by Teddy Yip
- Eunuchs (film), a 2007 British documentary
- Eunuchus, a comedy by the 2nd century BCE Roman playwright Terence

== See also ==
- Eunice (disambiguation)
- UNICE (disambiguation)
- Unix (disambiguation)
