= Zima Blue and Other Stories =

Short story collection by Alastair Reynolds

Zima Blue and Other Stories cover

Zima Blue and Other Stories (2006, ISBN 1-59780-058-9, republished in 2009 as Zima Blue, ISBN 978-0-575-08455-1) is the first collection of short works by Alastair Reynolds. It was published in September 2006, by Night Shade Books. It includes ten stories, most of them long out of print. None of the stories in it are set in Reynolds's well-known Revelation Space universe. However Galactic North, a collection of most of Reynolds's Revelation Space short stories, was released soon after.

There is a limited edition (2006, ISBN 1-59780-059-7) with an extra story, "Digital to Analogue", and with Reynolds's signature. "Digital to Analogue" was originally published in the 1992 anthology In Dreams.

A new version of the collection was published in April 2009 and contained all the stories listed below as well as Minla's Flowers (currently available in The New Space Opera), Cardiff Afterlife (a sequel of sorts to Signal to Noise) and Everlasting (first published in Interzone, Summer 2005).

== Contents ==
- Introduction by Paul J. McAuley
- "Angels of Ashes" (Originally published in Asimov's SF, July 1999; unavailable since then)
- "Beyond the Aquila Rift" (Originally published in Constellations, edited by Peter Crowther, 2005)
- "Enola" (Originally published in Interzone 54, December 1991; unavailable since then in English)
- "Hideaway" (Originally published in Interzone 157, July 2000; unavailable since then)
- "Merlin's Gun" (Originally published in Asimov's SF, May 2000; unavailable since then)
- "The Real Story" (Originally published in Mars Probes, edited by Peter Crowther, 2002)
- "Spirey and the Queen" (Originally published in Interzone 108, June 1996)
- "Understanding Space and Time" (Originally published in a limited edition of 400 copies for the Novacon 35 Sci Fi convention)
- "Zima Blue" (Originally published in Postscripts magazine, issue 4, edited by Peter Crowther)

There was also one brand new story included, "Signal to Noise", which Reynolds had recently finished and for which Reynolds was shortlisted for the 2006 British Science Fiction Association award for short fiction .

For each story in the collection, Reynolds provides a personal afterword in which he discusses the story's genesis, influences, and such, which might be of interest to the reader.

== Adaptations ==
On March 10, 2019, Alastair Reynolds announced that his short story "Zima Blue" was adapted as part of Netflix's animated anthology Love, Death & Robots. This story, along with "Beyond the Aquila Rift" are the first Reynolds' works to be adapted for TV or film.
