= Century Rain =

2004 novel by Alastair Reynolds

- Hardcover edition
- Author: Alastair Reynolds
- Language: English
- Genre: Science fiction
- Publisher: Gollancz
- Publication date: 25 November 2004
- Publication place: United Kingdom
- Media type: Print (Hardback)
- Pages: 512
- ISBN: 978-0575074361

Century Rain is a 2004 noir science fiction alternative history mystery novel by Welsh author Alastair Reynolds (ISBN 0-575-07436-1).

== Plot summary ==
Wendell Floyd is an expatriate American living in an alternative version of 1950s Paris. In this world, the Nazi invasion of France failed, and Hitler was deposed by the German High Command. Without World War II, technology in this world has stagnated at 1930s levels, and Fascist political parties have gained power in France. Floyd is a part-time jazz musician whose career has stalled since his ex-girlfriend, Greta, left Paris to pursue a musical career touring with another jazz band. He and his band-mate André Custine earn a supplemental income working as private detectives. When the novel opens, Floyd and Custine are hired by a concerned landlord to investigate the death of one of his tenants. Blanchard, the landlord, is certain that the death of Susan White, which the Parisian police have written off as an accident, is murder. Floyd is not so certain, but he's willing to investigate.

In a scene seemingly from another novel, Verity Auger finds herself responsible when her archaeology dig beneath the frozen ruins of some far-flung future Paris results in the death of one of her students. During her trial she is caught up in political infighting and maneuvered into accepting a high-risk assignment, without knowing what it entails.

When she is summoned on a mission to Mars by the top-secret security agency Contingencies, Auger is relieved to be exempt from her tribunal and the years of prison she would have faced. However, she is taken to a secret underground base on the Martian moon Phobos containing an ancient alien relic that opens a portal to a distant part of the galaxy, and told that she is to go through it. At the other end of the portal is a version of Earth in the year 1959, almost 300 years in Auger’s past. She is to retrieve a tin of documents that was left behind on that Earth by an agent who died under mysterious circumstances.

== Reviews ==
- Cassada, Jackie. "Century Rain." Library Journal 130.11 (15 June 2005): 66–66.
- "Century Rain." Publishers Weekly 252.19 (9 May 2005): 51–51.
- Schroeder, Regina. "Century Rain." Booklist 101.19/20 (June 2005): 1769–1769.
- "CENTURY RAIN." Entertainment Weekly (8 July 2005): 73–73.
- "CENTURY RAIN." Science Fact & Science Fiction Concatenation (15 April 2009): vol 19 (3).
