= Galactic Empires (anthology) =

2008 anthology edited by Gardner Dozois

- First edition
- Author: Edited by Gardner Dozois
- Cover artist: Vincent Di Fate
- Language: English
- Genre: Science fiction
- Publisher: Science Fiction Book Club / Writer's House Inc.
- Publication date: 2008
- Publication place: United States
- Media type: Print (Hardcover)

Galactic Empires is a science fiction anthology edited by American writer Gardner Dozois, published in 2008. It should not be confused with the two Brian Aldiss anthologies Galactic Empires Volumes One and Two published in 1976.

== Contents ==
The book includes 6 novellas, all commissioned for this book and published here for the first time. This is the second anthology of original SF novellas edited by Dozois for the Science Fiction Book Club, the first being One Million A.D., published in 2005. Two of the six authors also appear in both anthologies: Robert Reed and Alastair Reynolds. The stories are as follows.

- Peter F. Hamilton: "The Demon Trap"
- Neal Asher: "Owner Space"
- Robert Reed: "The Man With the Golden Balloon"
- Alastair Reynolds: "The Six Directions of Space"
- Stephen Baxter: "The Seer and the Silverman"
- Ian McDonald: "The Tear"
