= Other Earths =

2009 anthology edited by Nick Gevers and Jay Lake

- First edition
- Author: Edited by Nick Gevers and Jay Lake
- Language: English
- Genre: Alternate history, science fiction
- Publisher: DAW Books
- Publication date: 2009
- Publication place: United States
- Media type: Print (paperback)
- ISBN: 0-7564-0546-7
- OCLC: 317699194

Other Earths (2009) is an alternate history, science fiction anthology of all-new stories being edited by Nick Gevers and Jay Lake.

== Contents ==
- Robert Charles Wilson: This Peaceable Land, or, The Unbearable Vision of Harriet Beecher Stowe
- Jeff VanderMeer: The Goat Variations
- Stephen Baxter: The Unblinking Eye
- Theodora Goss: Csilla's Story
- Liz Williams: Winterborn
- Gene Wolfe: Donovan Sent Us
- Greg van Eekhout: The Holy City and Em's Reptile Farm
- Alastair Reynolds: The Receivers
- Paul Park: A Family History
- Lucius Shepard: Dog-Eared Paperpack of My Life
- Benjamin Rosenbaum: Nine Alternate Alternate Histories
