= Revenger (novel) =

2016 novel by Alastair Reynolds

- First edition
- Author: Alastair Reynolds
- Cover artist: www.blacksheep.uk.com
- Language: English
- Series: Revenger Trilogy
- Genre: Space Opera
- Publisher: Gollancz
- Publication date: 20 September 2016
- Publication place: United Kingdom
- Media type: Print (hardback & paperback)
- Pages: 411 (hardcover)
- ISBN: 978-0-5750-9053-8
- OCLC: 994810105
- Dewey Decimal: 823.914 23
- LC Class: PR6068.E95 R492 2016
- Followed by: Shadow Captain

Revenger is a 2016 science fiction novel by British author Alastair Reynolds. It is unconnected to any of Reynolds's previous works, and is the first book in the Revenger Trilogy. A sequel, entitled Shadow Captain was published on 10 January 2019, and a third and final book in the trilogy, Bone Silence, was published in 2020.

Revenger won the 2017 Locus Award for Best Young Adult Book, and was a finalist for the 2018 Philip K. Dick Award.

== Plot ==
Tens of millions of years in the future, sisters Adrana and Arafura ('Fura') Ness are skilled bone readers—the primary method by which spaceships communicate with one another. Their skill at bone reading leads them to be taken on as apprentices aboard 'Monetta's Mourn,' a spaceship captained by Pol Rackamore. Rackamore and his crew engage in the practice of finding ancient technological artifacts, called "baubles". While in search of these artifacts, their ship is attacked by the infamous space pirate Bosa Sennen, separating the sisters and leaving Fura adrift on the ship in empty space. When she emerges from hiding two days later, she finds the bodies of her crew and swears revenge on Bosa.

Fura hails a distant ship that rescues her and one other survivor, Prozor, the ship's integrator, or technician. They serve on the new ship's crew and explore a bauble on their way back to civilization. After docking, the ship's captain offers a valuable "quoin" to entice Fura and Prozor to reveal any intelligence on baubles, especially the elusive one known as the Fang, but they do not share any information, despite Prozor's familiarity with it.

Prozor guides Fura to a shady bar with a contact who could help her find a ship, but they are surprised by the man once dispatched by her father to shepherd her back home. He insists her sister is dead, stuns Prozor, and forces Fura to wear a tracking bracelet before he takes her aboard a commercial clipper ship.

Fura finds the bone room on the ship, where she uses the skull to contact Adrana and confirm she's alive. She vows to rescue her from the clutches of Bosa, though Adrana pleads with her younger sister to go home instead. Fura plans to find Adrana before Bosa uses torture, drugs, and psychological manipulation to remake the girl into her protegé.

Fura is returned to her father, but becomes captive in his home under the debilitating medication of the family doctor. She finds the remains of the old robot who once served as the sisters' guardian and tutor, repairs him, and hears the message left for her by Prozor. She tells Fura she has found a new crew that needs a bone reader like Fura, who obtains the robot's help to escape the house and search party. At the space dock, she finds the privateer captain who has hired Prozor and pitches herself for the position of bone reader.

Working aboard the new ship, Fura and Prozor hide their personal history from the crew. Fura shares with her a secret plan to guide the captain to the Fang, which contains powerful alien weapons, once sought by Captain Rackamore. When the sisters talk through the skulls again, Fura persuades Adrana to suggest the idea to Bosa of raiding their ship after they retrieve the treasure from the Fang, at which time Fura will spring her trap.

Fura manages to sway her captain to set course for the Fang, where their exploratory party finds the legendary weapons and armor cache deep within. Fura reveals that she has tricked the captain to find this treasure, which they must use against Bosa, who will soon attack.

As the crew escapes the bauble, whose protective field will soon close, they detect Bosa's ship as she hails them. Fura and her crew don the alien armor, fight the pirate boarding party, and finally defeat Bosa, although their ship suffers catastrophic damage.

Fura and her surviving crewmates seize control of the pirate ship and capture the wounded Bosa. Fura reunites with Adrana in a moment of reckoning, as she discovers how her sister has been changed under Bosa's influence. Fura asks Bosa why she had hoarded the valuable quoins obtained by so many privateering crews, alluding to a possible answer behind the ancient mystery of the quoins. To put her mind at rest, Fura expresses her hope to Adrana that she will become herself again, without a trace of Bosa. They agree to pursue the thrill of cracking more baubles and Fura retires to Bosa's cabin to write her true account of her adventure.

== Reception ==
Revenger has been labelled by some reviews as a young adult novel, although it has not been marketed as such by the publisher. Reynolds addresses this on his blog, saying he hopes the novel "is a straightforward SF novel that also happens to be accessible, and perhaps accessible to somewhat younger readers."

Mark Yon of SFFWorld.com describes the novel as "an entertaining pirate romp ... with a touch of Firefly." Publishers Weekly calls Revenger a "remarkably creative, resonant space opera."
