= 185 Eunike =

Main-belt asteroid

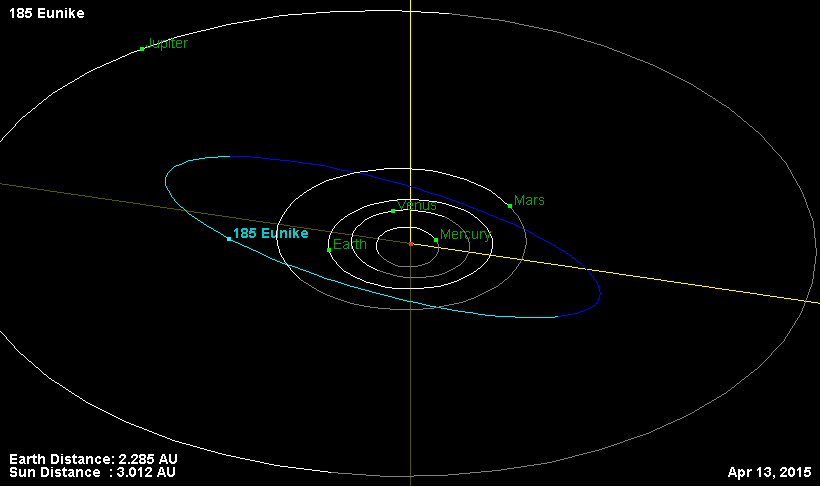
- Orbital diagram

Discovery
- Discovered by: C. H. F. Peters, 1878
- Discovery date: 1 March 1878

Designations
- Pronunciation: /juːˈnaɪkiː/
- Named after: Εὐνίκη Eynīkē
- Alternative designations: A878 EA
- Minor planet category: Main belt
- Adjectives: Eunikean /juːnɪˈkiːən/

Orbital characteristics
- Epoch 31 July 2016 (JD 2457600.5)
- Uncertainty parameter 0
- Observation arc: 131.77 yr (48128 d)
- Aphelion: 3.0924 AU (462.62 Gm)
- Perihelion: 2.3843 AU (356.69 Gm)
- Semi-major axis: 2.7383 AU (409.64 Gm)
- Eccentricity: 0.12930
- Orbital period (sidereal): 4.53 yr (1655.1 d)
- Mean anomaly: 327.48°
- Mean motion: 0° 13^{m} 3.036^{s} / day
- Inclination: 23.238°
- Longitude of ascending node: 153.84°
- Argument of perihelion: 224.01°
- Earth MOID: 1.41759 AU (212.068 Gm)
- Jupiter MOID: 2.40697 AU (360.078 Gm)
- T_{Jupiter}: 3.222

Physical characteristics
- Dimensions: 160.61 ± 5.00 km (composite estimate); 157.51±2.6 km
- Mass: (3.60±0.64)×10^{18} kg (Note: Calculated from its standard gravitational parameter GM = 0.240±0.043 km^{3}/s^{2}.)
- Mean density: 1.66 g/cm^{3}
- Synodic rotation period: 21.797 h (0.9082 d); 21.812 ± 0.001 hours
- Geometric albedo: 0.0638±0.002
- Spectral type: C
- Absolute magnitude (H): 7.62, 7.45 ± 0.01

185 Eunike is a dark and very large main-belt asteroid. It was discovered by C. H. F. Peters on March 1, 1878, in Clinton, New York and named after Eunike, a Nereid in Greek mythology whose name means 'happy victory'. The name was chosen to celebrate the Treaty of San Stefano (1878).

This object is orbiting the Sun at a distance of 2.74 AU with an eccentricity of 0.129 and an orbital period of 4.53 years. Its orbital plane is inclined at an angle of 23.2° to the plane of the ecliptic. Using infrared measurements, the diameter has been measured at 160.464 km. It has a primitive carbonaceous composition.

Based upon photometric observations made between 2010 and 2014, this asteroid has a rotation period of 21.812±0.001 hours and a brightness variation of 0.08±0.01 in magnitude. At opposition, the absolute magnitude was measured at 7.45±0.01. It displays a hemispheric albedo dichotomy similar to that on 4 Vesta.

As of 17 September 2020, there have been thirteen observed occultations of stars by Eunike.
