= Blue Remembered Earth =

Science fiction novel by Alastair Reynolds

- First edition
- Author: Alastair Reynolds
- Language: English
- Genre: Science fiction novel
- Publisher: Gollancz
- Publication date: 19 January 2012
- Publication place: United Kingdom
- Media type: Print (hardcover and paperback); E-book; Audiobook
- ISBN: 978-0-575-08827-6
- Followed by: On the Steel Breeze

Blue Remembered Earth is a science fiction novel by Welsh author Alastair Reynolds, first published by Gollancz on 19 January 2012. It describes the efforts of two adult siblings to solve a mystery in the pseudo-utopian 2160s. The novel is the first of the Poseidon's Children trilogy, which follows humanity's development over many centuries, with the intention of portraying a more optimistic future than anything Reynolds had previously written. The second book in the trilogy, On the Steel Breeze, was released on 26 September 2013, and the trilogy's finale, Poseidon's Wake, was released on 30 April 2015.

== Background ==
Reynolds first announced his plans to write the Poseidon's Children trilogy (known at the time as the "11k" trilogy) in early 2009. He described the first novel of the series as featuring a utopian future where Africa is a leading technological power. Blue Remembered Earth was initially scheduled for publication in 2011, but was ultimately released in January 2012.

== Plot summary ==
Blue Remembered Earth takes place in the 2160s, at a time when humanity has repaired Earth's climate and extensively colonised the inner Solar System. An omnipresent surveillance system (known as the "Mechanism") ensures that violent crime is almost unheard-of, and genetic engineering has vastly extended human lifespans. China, India and the nations of Africa are now the world's leading technological powers, although they face competition from the United Aquatic Nations, a new underwater civilisation populated by water-breathing transhumans. Almost all humans possess neural computer interfaces known as "augs", which allow them to access online information, view augmented reality displays, translate speech in real-time and operate telepresence robots. Some individuals, wishing to escape the constant surveillance of Earth's Mechanism, live in a bohemian, ungoverned "Descrutinized Zone" on the far side of the Moon.

The story focuses on Geoffrey and Sunday Akinya, a brother and sister who are members of a powerful African corporate family. Following the death of their influential grandmother Eunice, the siblings begin investigating a series of cryptic messages that Eunice left across the Solar System over the previous century, during her voyages to Pythagoras Crater, Phobos, Pavonis Mons, and the Kuiper Belt. It emerges that Eunice placed herself in exile in the Winter Palace, a space station at one of the Moon's Lagrange points. It is in this station that she died, but not before initiating a mysterious research project. Facing opposition from powerful Earth authorities and even members of their own family, Geoffrey and Sunday are forced to travel to the edge of the Solar System to discover Eunice's secret.

== Reception ==
Eric Brown of The Guardian gave Blue Remembered Earth a highly positive review, saying that "Reynolds's near-future is so brilliantly extrapolated, with original ideas fizzing off every page, that the reader is left awestruck at what further wonders await in the following volumes." Niall Harrison of Strange Horizons praised Reynolds' intricate worldbuilding while criticizing the thriller elements as making the plot "more functional, and less textured". Javier Martinez of the Los Angeles Review of Books praised the novel as "engrossing" and "deeply romantic", noting that it is "informed by an infectious sense of optimism".
