= In Dreams (book) =

1992 science fiction and horror short story collection

- First edition cover Cover art by Dave McKean
- Author: Paul J. McAuley and Kim Newman
- Genre: Anthology; Horror; Science fiction
- Publisher: Victor Gollancz
- ISBN: 0-575-05201-5

In Dreams (ISBN 0-575-05201-5) is a 1992 anthology of science fiction and horror short stories, 'a celebration of the 7-inch single in all-original SF and horror fiction'. It was edited by Paul J. McAuley and Kim Newman, and published by Gollancz. It includes stories by Jonathan Carroll, Greg Egan, Ian R. MacLeod, Alastair Reynolds, Lewis Shiner, and Don Webb.

The Alastair Reynolds story from In Dreams, "Digital to Analogue", was re-published in a special edition of Zima Blue and Other Stories (2006, ISBN 1-59780-058-9).
