= Dominic Green (science fiction writer) =

British writer

Dominic Green (born 1967) is a British writer of short science fiction. His short story "The Clockwork Atom Bomb" was nominated for a 2005 Hugo Award. Green is best known for his stories published in Interzone during the 1990s and 2000s, many of which have been reprinted in various Year's Best anthologies. Interzone published a special issue devoted to Green and his stories in July 2009.

== Biography ==
Green has lived for much of his life in Bakewell and Northampton. He graduated in English from St Catharine's College, Cambridge and works in information technology. He is married to the painter Allyson X. Green and until recently taught Kung Fu part-time.

In 2010, Fingerpress brought out Green's first published novel, Smallworld. In 2011, he electronically published a young adult SF novel, Saucerers and Gondoliers, the first of a series set in and around the fictional United States of the Zodiac, a secret set of colonies in space involved in a struggle for independence from Britain and the United States, as well as political and military intrigue involving the former Soviet colonies and alien/Nazi symbiotes. The series is named after its two primary characters, Anthony Stevens and Cleopatra Shakespeare, two UFO-abducted teenagers from Northampton.

== Bibliography ==
=== Short stories ===
- "Moving Mysteriously" (Interzone, June 1996, and translated as "Les Mystères de la Sainte-Propulsion", Invasions 99, Étoiles Vives, 1999)
- "Evertrue Carnadine" (Interzone, October 1996)
- "Everywhen" (Interzone, April 1997)
- "The Cozumel Incident" (Interzone, July 1997)
- "King's Chamber" (in the anthology Decalog 5: Wonders, 1997)
- "Queen of the Hill" (Interzone, April 1998)
- "That Thing Over There" (Interzone June 1998. Reprinted in Year's Best SF 4, 1999)
- "Something Chronic" (Interzone, September 2000)
- "Rude Elves and Dread Norse Reindeer" (Interzone, December 2000)
- "Queen of Hearts" (Interzone, November 2001)
- "Blue Water, Grey Death" (Interzone, January 2002)
- "News from Hilaria" (Interzone, May 2002)
- "Send Me A Mentagram" (Interzone November 2003. Reprinted in The Year's Best Science Fiction: Twenty-First Annual Collection, 2004)
- "The Rule of Terror" (Interzone, May 2003)
- "Three Lions on the Armband" (Interzone, Spring 2004)
- "Sherlock Holmes and the Adventure of the Lost World" (BBC Cult website, 2004)
- "The Clockwork Atom Bomb" (Interzone, May 2005 - nominated for a Hugo Award in the Best Short Story category and winner of the 2005 Interzone Readers' Poll. Reprinted in The Year's Best Science Fiction: Twenty-Third Annual Collection.)
- "Butterfly Bomb", "Coat of Many Colours" and "Glister" (Interzone, July–August 2009)
- "Shining Armor" (The Solaris Book of New Science Fiction, Volume 2, ed. George Mann, reprinted in Year's Best SF); featured in Locus's recommended reading list

== Novels and series ==
- The Space Opera on Mount Ararat series:
  - Book 1 - Smallworld (2010)
  - Book 2 - Littlestar (2011)
- The Ant and Cleo series:
  - Book 1 - Saucerers and Gondoliers (2013)
  - Book 2 - Sister Ships and Alastair (2013)
  - Book 3 - There Ain't Gonna Be No World War Three (2013)
  - Book 4 - Destination Alpha Four (2013)
  - Book 5 - Dog on the Highway (2013)
  - Book 6 - At the Goings Down of the Suns (2013)
  - Book 7 - Time Held Me Green and Dying (2014)
  - Book 8 - The Moon a Ghostly Galleon (2015)
  - Book 9 - Today's Stars for Dinosaurus (2016)
  - Book 10 - Make Omicron Eridani Great Again (2018)
  - Book 11 - On A Small World West Of Wonder (2019)
  - Book 12 - We Have Been in Hell Before (2022)
- Warlords of Llantatis (2014)
- Elder Shepherd (2016)
- Cowboys & Dinosaurs (2016)
- The Marshal College series:
  - Book 1 - Phil and the Death Machine (2017)
- The Big Sis series:
  - Book 1 - Twinkle, Twinkle, Collapsar (2020)
