= The Year's Best Science Fiction: Twenty-Third Annual Collection =

2006 anthology edited by Gardner Dozois

- Editor: Gardner Dozois
- Language: English
- Series: The Year's Best Science Fiction
- Genre: Science fiction
- Publisher: St. Martin's Press
- Publication date: 2006
- Publication place: United States
- Media type: Print (hardcover & trade paperback)
- Pages: 660 pp
- ISBN: 9780312353353 (hardcover) ISBN 9780312353346 (trade paperback)
- OCLC: 69483800
- Preceded by: The Year's Best Science Fiction: Twenty-Second Annual Collection
- Followed by: The Year's Best Science Fiction: Twenty-Fourth Annual Collection

The Year's Best Science Fiction: Twenty-Third Annual Collection is a science fiction anthology edited by Gardner Dozois that was published in 2006. It is the 23rd in The Year's Best Science Fiction series. It won the Locus Award for best anthology in 2007.

== Contents ==
The book includes a 30-page summation by Dozois; 29 stories, all that first appeared in 2005, and each with a two-paragraph introduction by Dozois; and a ten-page referenced list of honorable mentions for the year. The stories are as follows:

- Ian McDonald: "The Little Goddess"
- Paolo Bacigalupi: "The Calorie Man"
- Alastair Reynolds: "Beyond the Aquila Rift"
- Daryl Gregory: "Second Person, Present Tense"
- Jay Lake and Ruth Nestvold: "The Canadian Who Came Almost All the Way Back From the Stars"
- Michael Swanwick: "Triceratops Summer"
- Robert Reed: "Camouflage"
- Ken MacLeod: "A Case of Consilience"
- Bruce Sterling: "The Blemmye's Strategem"
- William Sanders: "Amba"
- Mary Rosenblum: "Search Engine"
- Chris Beckett: "Picadilly Circus"
- David Gerrold: "In the Quake Zone"
- Liz Williams: "La Malcontenta"
- Stephen Baxter: "The Children of Time"
- Vonda N. McIntyre: "Little Faces"
- Gene Wolfe: "Comber"
- Harry Turtledove: "Audubon in Atlantis"
- Hannu Rajaniemi: "Deus Ex Homine"
- Steven Popkes: "The Great Caruso"
- Neal Asher: "Softly Spoke the Gabbleduck"
- Alastair Reynolds: "Zima Blue"
- David Moles: "Planet of the Amazon Women"
- Dominic Green: "The Clockwork Atom Bomb"
- Chris Roberson: "Gold Mountain"
- Gwyneth Jones: "The Fulcrum"
- Peter Watts and Derryl Murphy: "Mayfly"
- Elizabeth Bear: "Two Dreams on Trains"
- Joe Haldeman: "Angel of Light"
- James Patrick Kelly: "Burn"
