= The Year's Best Science Fiction: Twenty-Fifth Annual Collection =

2008 anthology edited by Gardner Dozois

- Editor: Gardner Dozois
- Language: English
- Series: The Year's Best Science Fiction
- Genre: Science fiction
- Publisher: St. Martin's Press
- Publication date: July 8, 2008
- Publication place: United States
- Media type: Print (hardcover & trade paperback)
- Pages: 672 pp
- ISBN: 9780312378608
- OCLC: 191924873
- Preceded by: The Year's Best Science Fiction: Twenty-Fourth Annual Collection
- Followed by: The Year's Best Science Fiction: Twenty-Sixth Annual Collection

The Year's Best Science Fiction: Twenty-Fifth Annual Collection is a science fiction anthology edited by Gardner Dozois that was published on July 8, 2008. It is the 25th in The Year's Best Science Fiction series and won the Locus Award for best anthology. The UK edition is titled The Mammoth Book Of Best New SF 21, the "21st Annual Collection" (ISBN 978-1845298289) and contains the same stories listed.

== Contents ==
The book includes 32 stories, all that were first published in 2007. The book also includes a summation by Dozois, a two-paragraph introduction to each story by Dozois and a referenced list of honorable mentions for the year. The stories are as follows:

- David Moles: "Finisterra"
- Ken MacLeod: "Lighting Out"
- John Barnes: "The Ocean is a Snowflake, Four Billion Miles Away"
- Gwyneth Jones: "Saving Tiamaat"
- James Van Pelt: "Of Late I Dreamt of Venus"
- Ian McDonald: "Verthandi's Ring"
- Una McCormack: "Sea Change"
- Chris Roberson: "The Sky is Large and the Earth is Small"
- Greg Egan: "Glory"
- Robert Silverberg: "Against the Current"
- Neal Asher: "Alien Archeology"
- Ted Chiang: "The Merchant and the Alchemist's Gate," which went on to win the 2008 Hugo Award for Best Novelette
- Justin Stanchfield: "Beyond the Wall"
- Bruce Sterling: "Kiosk"
- Stephen Baxter: "Last Contact"
- Alastair Reynolds: "The Sledge-Maker's Daughter"
- Ian McDonald: "Sanjeev and Robotwallah"
- Michael Swanwick: "The Skysailor's Tale"
- Vandana Singh: "Of Love and Other Monsters"
- Greg Egan: "Steve Fever"
- Kage Baker: "Hellfire at Twilight"
- Brian Stableford: "The Immortals of Atlantis"
- Pat Cadigan: "Nothing Personal"
- Elizabeth Bear: "Tideline," which went on to win the 2008 Hugo Award for Best Short Story
- Keith Brooke: "The Accord"
- Nancy Kress: "Laws of Survival"
- Tom Purdom: "The Mists of Time"
- Kristine Kathryn Rusch: "Craters"
- Ted Kosmatka: "The Prophet of Flores"
- Benjamin Rosenbaum & David Ackert: "Stray"
- Robert Reed: "Roxie"
- Gregory Benford: "Dark Heaven"
