= The Year's Best Science Fiction: Twenty-Fourth Annual Collection =

2007 anthology edited by Gardner Dozois

- Editor: Gardner Dozois
- Language: English
- Series: The Year's Best Science Fiction
- Genre: Science fiction
- Publisher: St. Martin's Press
- Publication date: 2007
- Publication place: United States
- Media type: Print (hardcover & trade paperback)
- Pages: 662 pp
- ISBN: 9780312363345
- OCLC: 155845698
- Preceded by: The Year's Best Science Fiction: Twenty-Third Annual Collection
- Followed by: The Year's Best Science Fiction: Twenty-Fifth Annual Collection

The Year's Best Science Fiction: Twenty-Fourth Annual Collection is a science fiction anthology edited by Gardner Dozois that was published in 2007. It is the 24th in The Year's Best Science Fiction series.

== Contents ==
The book includes a 29-page summation by Dozois; 28 stories, all that first appeared in 2006, and each with a two-paragraph introduction by Dozois; and a ten-page referenced list of honorable mentions for the year. For the second year in a row, this book includes two stories by Alastair Reynolds. The stories are as follows.

- Cory Doctorow: "I, Row-boat"
- Robert Charles Wilson: "Julian: A Christmas Story"
- Michael Swanwick: Tin Marsh"
- Ian McDonald: "The Djinn's Wife"
- Benjamin Rosenbaum: "The House Beyond Your Sky"
- Kage Baker: "Where the Golden Apples Grow"
- Bruce McAllister: "Kin"
- Alastair Reynolds: "Signal To Noise"
- Jay Lake and Ruth Nestvold: "The Big Ice"
- Gregory Benford: "Bow Shock"
- Justin Stanchfield: "In the River"
- Walter Jon Williams: "Incarnation Day"
- Greg van Eekhout: "Far As You Can Go"
- Robert Reed: "Good Mountain"
- David D. Levine: "I Hold My Father's Paws"
- Paul J. McAuley: "Dead Men Walking"
- Mary Rosenblum: "Home Movies"
- Daryl Gregory: "Damascus"
- Jack Skillingstead: "Life On the Preservation"
- Paolo Bacigalupi: "Yellow Card Man"
- Greg Egan: "Riding the Crocodile"
- Elizabeth Bear and Sarah Monette: "The Ile of Dogges"
- Ken MacLeod: "The Highway Men"
- Stephen Baxter: "The Pacific Mystery"
- Carolyn Ives Gilman: "Okanoggan Falls"
- John Barnes: "Every Hole Is Outlined"
- A. M. Dellamonica: "The Town On Blighted Sea"
- Alastair Reynolds: "Nightingale"
