= Harvest of Time =

2013 novel by Alastair Reynolds

- Hardcover edition
- Author: Alastair Reynolds
- Language: English
- Series: Doctor Who book
- Subject: Featuring: Third Doctor; Jo Grant, UNIT and the Master
- Genre: Fiction
- Publisher: BBC Books
- Publication date: June 2013
- Publication place: United Kingdom
- Media type: Print
- Pages: 368
- ISBN: 978-1849904186 (standard)

Doctor Who: Harvest of Time is a Third Doctor novel by Alastair Reynolds. It features the Third Doctor (as portrayed by Jon Pertwee), Jo Grant, the Master (as portrayed by Roger Delgado), Brigadier Lethbridge-Stewart, and other familiar characters from the Third Doctor era of Doctor Who.

Harvest of Time, a BBC Books original novel, was published in June 2013. It was simultaneously released as an eBook and in an unabridged audio version read by Geoffrey Beevers.

== Plot ==
The Doctor and the Master must make an uneasy alliance to overcome a common enemy, the Sild, which have been attacking the Earth and using the Master as their tool of conquest. With the Brigadier, UNIT, and others gradually forgetting who the Master is, the Doctor and the Master must defeat the Sild before the Master becomes unstitched from time and the Earth is overrun by the vicious Sild. The events of the novel take place at some point after The Dæmons and before The Sea Devils; settings include a North Sea oil rig and a distant planet in a very distant future.

== See also ==
- List of Doctor Who Audiobooks
- List of non-televised Third Doctor stories
