= The Clockwork Atom Bomb =

- Short story by Dominic Green
- Country: United Kingdom
- Language: English
- Genre(s): Science fiction

Publication
- Published in: Interzone
- Publication type: Periodical
- Media type: Print (Magazine)
- Publication date: May/June 2005

"The Clockwork Atom Bomb" is a 2005 science fiction short story by British writer Dominic Green. It was first published in Interzone.

== Plot summary ==
Mativi is a weapons inspector for the United Nations, whose mission to Kinshasa is hindered by the local residents' insistence that his actions will disrupt their economy.

== Reception ==
"The Clockwork Atom Bomb" won the 2005 Interzone readers' poll as the most popular story of the year, and was a finalist for the 2006 Hugo Award for Best Short Story. It was also included in the 23rd edition of The Year's Best Science Fiction, a collection of outstanding science fiction short stories edited by Gardner Dozois.
