= Unix (disambiguation) =

Unix may refer to:

- Unix, a family of operating systems, the first originally developed by Bell Labs at AT&T
  - Single UNIX Specification, the trademark UNIX and the terms of its use, now owned by The Open Group
  - POSIX (IEEE 1003 or ISO/IEC 9945), the basic Unix interface standard
  - OpenServer (formerly SCO Unix, System V) the owner's version of the operating system, now owned by Xinuos
  - UNIX System V, the orthodox family of licensed Unices, canonical form being SCO Unix that became Open Server
  - BSD Unix, the widespread family of licensed Unices originating from UCBerkeley
    - BSD licenses, a family of software licenses, sometimes called "Unix license"
  - Unix System Laboratories, the division that developed unix, especially the System V family
    - SCOsource, the owner of unix intellectual property, especially as it relates to the canonical form SCO Unix
  - List of Unix systems, for a Unix operating system
- Unix-like, the extended family of operating systems inspired by and having a general similarity with Unix
- Unix Magazine, a defunct magazine covering unix and unix-like software sector
- UNIX Review, a defunct magazine covering unix software sector

== See also ==
- History of Unix
- Unix wars, the battle between BSD Unix and System V for supremacy
- UnixWorld, a defunct magazine covering unix software sector
- UNICE (disambiguation)
- Eunice (disambiguation)
- Eunuch (disambiguation)
