= Pushing Ice =

2005 novel by Alastair Reynolds

- Author: Alastair Reynolds
- Language: English
- Genre: Science fiction novel
- Publisher: Gollancz
- Publication date: 27 October 2005
- Publication place: United Kingdom
- Media type: Print (Hardback)
- Pages: 460
- ISBN: 0-575-07438-8
- OCLC: 61302291
- Dewey Decimal: 823/.92 22
- LC Class: PR6068.E95 P87 2005

Pushing Ice is a 2005 science fiction novel by Welsh author Alastair Reynolds. According to Reynolds' Web site, the story takes place in a different universe from his Revelation Space stories.

== Plot summary ==
Pushing Ice begins in the distant future, where the elected rulers of the "Congress of the Lindblad Ring" gather to decide on a suitable ceremony to honour a woman they consider responsible for the technological advancement and territorial expansion of the future human race, Bella Lind. To explain her role, the chronology is then pushed back to the early days of humanity's crewed exploration of the Solar System, where it is explained that Lind is the captain of the Rockhopper, a spacecraft used for mining cometary ice. While on a routine mission, Lind is informed that Saturn's moon Janus has deviated from its normal orbit, and is accelerating out of the Solar System. The Rockhopper, deemed the only ship capable of catching up to Janus, is asked to pursue the moon, sending back as much information as possible before being forced to turn back by the limitations of fuel and supplies. However, on their approach to the moon, revealed to be a camouflaged alien spacecraft, Lind and her crew are caught in the field of the ship's inertialess drive, causing them to travel farther and faster than expected, and beyond their capacity to return to Earth. Realising their predicament, the crew decide to land on the moon and attempt to survive the flight out of the Solar System, wherever it may take them. Eventually it becomes apparent that the ship is heading towards Spica, a close binary pair in the constellation of Virgo.

At one point before the landing, Bella's closest friend and subordinate, Svetlana Barseghian, pushes for Bella to turn the ship around while there is still a chance to return to Earth. Bella decides that turning back is too dangerous, angering Svetlana, who then leads a mutiny and, after the ship lands, exiles Bella to a structure set apart from the main colony. The novel traces the life of the colony for many years as they try to eke out an existence on Janus and determine why it is moving through space. They work out a way of deriving power from some alien technology they find, and slowly start to improve their living conditions.

They eventually arrive at a vast megastructure where they meet an alien species, called 'Fountainheads'. The encounter with the benevolent aliens improves the colonists' situation dramatically. The alien presence is played poorly by Svetlana who loses control of the colony to Bella. Bella does not exile Svetlana, even if she chooses a form of self-exile.

The Fountainheads are able to rejuvenate humans, healing injuries and making them younger. The only restriction is that they cannot heal brain damage without the patient losing part of their personality. Bella and several others undergo rejuvenation to make themselves younger. Those that are rejuvenated still age, but more slowly. Another several decades go by as the Fountainheads and the humans co-exist. The Fountainheads are trading advanced technology with the colony in exchange for drilling rights on Janus, whose core is a vast energy resource.

The Fountainheads warn Bella of the arrival of another, repulsive (by human standards) race called Musk Dogs that will infect the colony and tear it apart in an effort to get at Janus' core. When they arrive, Svetlana meets with the Musk Dogs and trades with them. She tries to regain control of the colony, but her actions set off a chain of events that destroys Janus and requires everyone to evacuate. Svetlana, with the assistance of the Fountainheads, leaves the structure through the gap created by the explosion. Pictures from her ship reveal the structure to be a Torus the size of a planetary system, with part of the structure missing at its center (believed to be the Spicans' quarters). Bella dies during the evacuation of Janus, but her body is nonetheless brought along with the evacuating colony. Her body remains in stasis for decades, waiting for the Fountainheads to restore her to life; she eventually awakens to learn that a new human colony has been established elsewhere in the structure.

== Factions ==
=== Congress of the Lindblad Ring ===
A far future human civilisation inhabiting a region of space roughly 500 light-years in diameter. The Congress has advanced femtotechnology granting the citizens capabilities such as near-instant travel, near-light speed spacecraft, and immortality. An elected representative from each member planet meets once every few hundred years to discuss governance of the Congress. Nearing their 10,000-year anniversary the representatives meet to discuss what to do to commemorate this occasion. One representative, Chromis Pasqueflower Bowerbird, proposes sending a message to Bella Lind, the "Benefactor" who made the Congress possible, over suggestions such as constructing a Dyson sphere or an ornamental fountain. This decision has far reaching implications for the rest of the characters.

=== The United Economic Entities (UEE) ===
In the 2050s, the United Nations has developed into a body that represents not just nations but any corporation with sufficient economic wealth. The Rockhopper is owned by one such entity and gains official UEE status upon commencing its interception with Janus. Not all strong economies are part of the UEE, however; these "rogue states" include China, who were expelled for their reckless experiments with forge vat technology leading to a grey goo outbreak.

=== The Fountainheads ===
Named after their appearance these enigmatic aliens are the first to contact the crew of the Rockhopper after their arrival at the Structure. A single Fountainhead is around 3 metres tall and resembles a flowing fountain with multiple layers of coloured limbs erupting from a central core, such as found on a willow tree. The outer layer of limbs are thicker and used for locomotion (tractor limbs), inner sets hang above the floor and are used for finer manipulation, the inner most limbs resemble gossamer threads and provide sensory information. Indeed, these sensory limbs often weave together to form a "hi-res" eye as named by the Rockhopper Crew. Little is known about the Fountainhead history other than their realm used to contain many hundreds of thousands of extrasolar systems and at some point uncovered the relics of a long gone humanity.

Fountainhead technology is far in advance of the technology available to the Rockhopper crew. Their ships resemble bubbles of coloured glass and have the ability to suppress inertia and manipulate gravity. Bella Lind remarks on the mastery of genetics that the Fountainheads possess, in spite of having few records of terrestrial marine life the Fountainheads are able to engineer a variety of fish that would not be out of place if found on Earth. Their mastery over biology is further demonstrated by their resurrection of previously dead (and now frozen) members of the crew and their ability to rejuvenate crew members to a younger age.

Fountainhead society is stated as having no factions but other than this little is known about their culture. Fountainhead psychology is fundamentally different from humans in ways that no human can really comprehend, it becomes apparent that the Fountainhead's perception of time is not linear but is strongly dependent on events. At one point, a crew member observes that 100 years of nothing is less time to a Fountainhead than a busy five minutes.

The fountainheads are a member species of the Shaft-Five Nexus, a group of like minded species who have a very stringent set of rules of order. The Nexus is largely responsible for containing the Uncontained.

The relationship between the population of Janus and the Fountainheads is one of benevolent trade. Janus (as with all new worlds in the Structure) holds vast power reserves. In exchange for access to some of this power, the Fountainheads exchanged history and technology from Earth from the time after the Rockhopper left. The technologies were a vast boon to the humans to launch their society from on the brink of extinction to one of prosperity.

=== The Whisperers ===
Introduced to Bella by the Fountainheads the Whisperers are a strange race also inhabiting the Structure. They are said to live on the other side of the "matter gap" and as such cannot interact with ordinary matter (much like the hypothetical mirror matter). They can only communicate through manipulating inertia and gravity, consequently communication with them ensues through the use of large tables covered in alien script with a heavy ball in the centre. The Whisperer can move the ball on their side of the matter gap to cause the ball on the table to move to different scripts (similar to a Ouija board). The Whisperers can pass through most Structure doors unhindered but with some have to use passkeys like other races, it is implied that the Whisperers have an advantage in making passkeys as other races buy these keys from them. The Whisperers do not appear to behave as a single faction with one Whisperer providing intelligence to the Fountainheads and others selling passkeys to the Musk Dogs and the Uncontained.

=== The Musk Dogs ===
A highly factious species, the Musk Dogs are another species of the Structure. Their ships resemble large organic bones with bits of other ships and technologies bolted on (and floating around) the main section; the only ship to be seen is named The Gristleship by Bella owing to its unfavourable look. Musk Dogs themselves resemble "many dogs fighting over a single bone". They resemble terrestrial dogs but are much larger with multiple legs, genitalia and mouths at odd angles. They are highly territorial with different members of the ship constantly competing with each other, visitors are marked by greeting Musk Dogs in an effort to gain status, Musk Dogs that displease their pack are often eaten. The only dealing any inhabitant of Janus has with the Musk Dogs is when The Gristleship arrives in orbit and after hacking into the communications net broadcasts propaganda claiming that the Fountainheads are exploiting the humans and that trade with the Musk Dogs would be far more profitable as they are willing to give technologies far beyond what they currently possess (inertialess drives, femtotechnology, passkeys for the endcap doors in the Structure to name but a few). In return they want to mine some power from Janus, like the Fountainheads.

The Fountainheads warn Bella that the Musk Dogs can't be trusted and that some technologies are far too dangerous for a species ill-equipped to handle them, though the Fountainheads do not know the Musk Dogs true intentions. Svetlana (in defiance of Bella's advice) trades with the Musk Dogs for a passkey in return for access to Janus. The attempted construction of the passkey leads to an outbreak of replicating femtotech causing many deaths, at the same time it is revealed that the Musk Dogs are not tapping energy from Janus but priming the moon to explode so as to blow a hole in the wall of the Structure.

=== The Uncontained ===
Little is known about The Uncontained but they are said to be a fiercely violent race. Upon their arrival in the Structure they immediately set about attacking nearby civilizations causing the genocide of one race and the near extinction of another. Towards the end of the novel the Fountainheads discover that The Uncontained are on the warpath and heading for Janus, indeed they are in league with the Musk Dogs and plan to use the destruction of Janus to escape the Structure.
