= Bone Silence =

Book by Alastair Reynolds

- Hardcover edition
- Author: Alastair Reynolds
- Language: English
- Series: Revenger Trilogy
- Genre: Science fiction
- Publisher: Gollancz
- Publication date: January 9, 2020
- Publication place: United Kingdom
- Media type: Print, e-book, audiobook
- Pages: 496
- ISBN: 978-057-509067-5
- Preceded by: Shadow Captain

Bone Silence is a 2020 hard science fiction novel by Welsh author Alastair Reynolds. This is the third and final novel in the Revenger Trilogy series, with the prequels being Revenger and Shadow Captain. The book was released on January 9, 2020, by Gollancz.

== Synopsis ==
Bone Silence is the third and final novel in Alastair Reynolds’ Revenger trilogy, a science fiction series blending space opera, cyberpunk, and Gothic horror elements. Set in a far-future solar system filled with ancient relics, ruthless factions, and mysterious alien technology, the story follows the adventures of the Ness sisters, Adrana and Arafura, as they navigate a dangerous and decaying civilization.

The sisters, once naive but now hardened by betrayal and violence, must outmaneuver their enemies while uncovering the dark truths behind their world’s history. They learn of the "Bone Silence," a cryptic and terrifying force linked to the long-vanished aliens who once inhabited the system. As they delve deeper, they realize that the entire civilization is built on lies, and the relics they’ve been plundering may have a will of their own. With time running out, the sisters must decide whether to save themselves or risk everything to expose the secrets that could shatter their world forever.

== Reception ==
Russell Letson writing for the Locus Online stated, "This is perfectly good adventure-stuff: colorful crew members, encounters with assorted crooks and spies, space combat, chases and escapes and betrayals. The enduring appeal for me is the setting, starting with the immediate environments of steampunkish solar-sailing spacecraft, all rigging and rivets and water-cooled coil-guns; or the tatty corridors and conduits and drinking-dens of ancient habitats. Even the more respectable kinds of stations are far from the sterile, molded-white-plastic modernism of Kubrick’s 2001." Mark Yon of SFF World wrote, "There is scope for other stories and other ideas to be pursued should Alastair or his publishers wish to do so, but if this is the end of our journey with Adrana and Fura, then the distance travelled by the Ness sisters over the three books, taken as a complete story, is impressive. If you’ve enjoyed the journey so far, Bone Silence should not disappoint."

== Awards ==
In 2021, the novel was nominated for Philip K. Dick Award.
