= Eunuchs (film) =

2007 British TV documentary film

- Genre: Documentary
- Directed by: Danny Horan
- Country of origin: United Kingdom
- Original language: English

Original release
- Network: Channel 4
- Release: 3 April 2007

Eunuchs is a television documentary film which premiered 3 April 2007 on Channel 4. The film interviewed and followed the lives of a number of men who chose voluntarily to become eunuchs.

== Overview ==
The film starts by interviewing the Sheriff of Haywood County, North Carolina, at the Waynesville home of S&M enthusiast Richard Sciara—known as 'Master Rick'—where he and two of his companions had been castrating men.

The interviewer meets Roger, a British man who was castrated by Dr Murray Kimmel, a surgeon in Philadelphia, and a young American man called Zachary Arnold who was planning to do likewise.

The programme also interviews Bill from Florida, who used a burdizzo at home to remove his own testicles to control his overactive sex drive and put the photographs online.

The fourth man they interview is Brother Shawn Francis Benedict from the LGBT-affirming Ray of Hope Church in Elmira, New York. He said that his castration represented "the end of my cooperation with all the traditional expectations of the American male".

== Reception ==
Lucy Mangan in The Guardian sarcastically wondered whether Channel 4 was adequately serving its public service remit, saying after watching it she felt "informed, entertained and ever so slightly like I am about to have a stroke". Mangan also noted that the programme failed to address the wider issues regarding gender and sexuality: it "told the stories without attempting to ask or answer questions about how we construct masculinity, what there might be to fear in belonging to an ostensibly privileged gender that you would rather cut off its physical markers than remain part of it, or what part an internalised cultural hatred of homosexuality might have played in the men's decisions".

In The Scotsman, Andrea Mullaney said that "the programme did make it seem less freakish" but she was left baffled as to why the men desired castration.

In The Independent, Thomas Sutcliffe remarked that the Internet enabled documentary film makers to locate "human compulsion or oddity" much easier as "prospective interviewees are stacked up on the specialist chat-room sites just waiting to receive your email". Sutcliffe also expressed concern for the interviewees over the "prurient curiosity" of the British television audience.
