= Eunice Frost =

British publisher (1914–1998)

- Born: 5 November 1914
- Died: 12 August 1998 (aged 83)
- Employer: Penguin Books

Eunice Frost OBE (5 November 1914 – 12 August 1998), was a British publisher. She started in 1936, working for Penguin Books, as secretary to co-founder Allen Lane, but soon was promoted to editor, and eventually a director of the company.

== Biography ==
Frost was born on 5 November 1914. In 1938, she began working at Penguin Books, which had been founded two years earlier, as a secretary. While working there, Lane would send her out to "deal with his difficulties," hiring and firing employees and handling issues for him.

In 1941, Frost set up the American branch of Penguin Books in New York. She was known as "Frostie" by her colleagues.

Frost retired in the 1960s due to ill health.

Frost died in Lewes, East Sussex on 12 August 1998.
