= Únice =

- Municipality
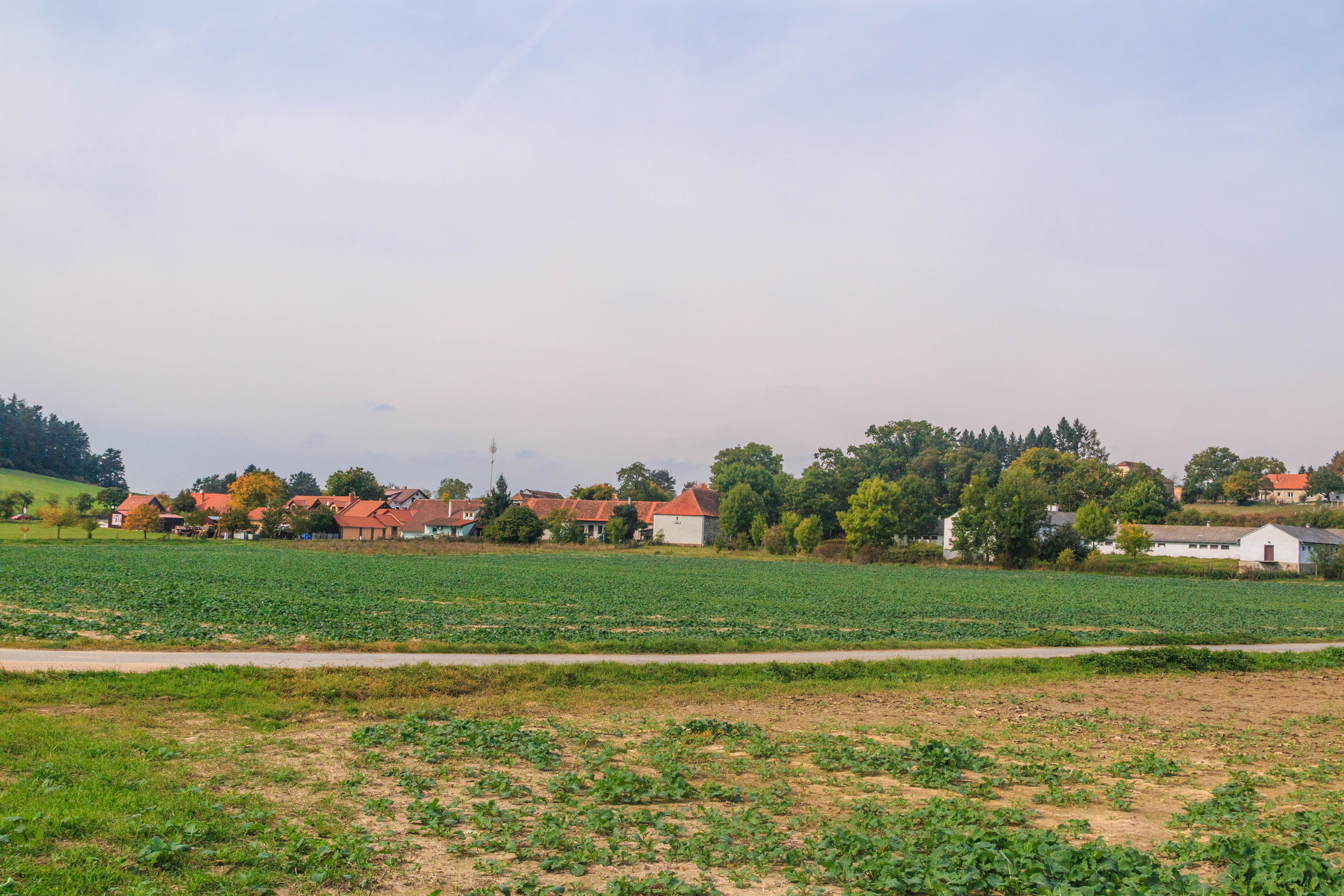
- Hubenov, a part of Únice

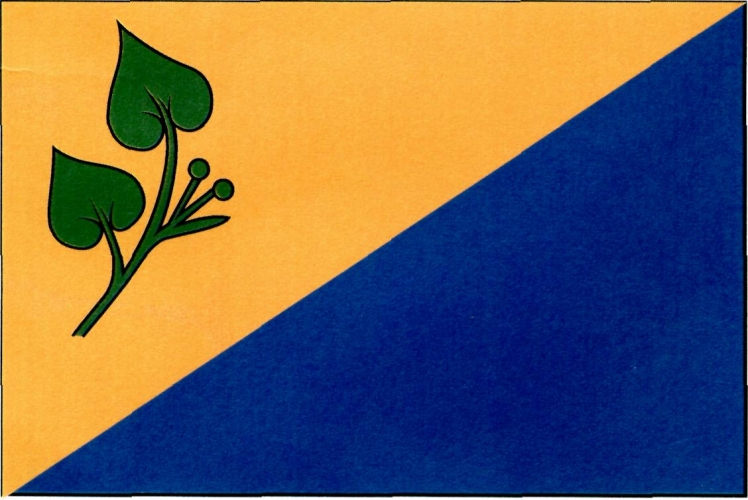
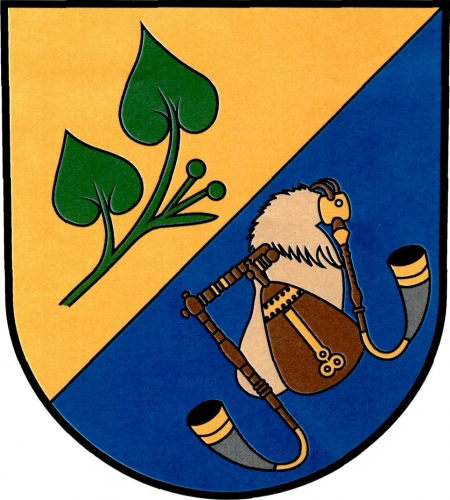
- Flag Coat of arms

- Location in the Czech Republic
- Coordinates: 49°18′44″N 13°52′6″E
- Country: Czech Republic
- Region: South Bohemian
- District: Strakonice
- First mentioned: 1308

Area
  - Total: 5.59 km^{2} (2.16 sq mi)
- Elevation: 468 m (1,535 ft)

Population (2026-01-01)
  - Total: 63
  - Density: 11/km^{2} (29/sq mi)
- Time zone: UTC+1 (CET)
  - Summer (DST): UTC+2 (CEST)
- Postal code: 386 01
- Website: unice-hubenov.cz

Únice is a municipality and village in Strakonice District in the South Bohemian Region of the Czech Republic. It has about 60 inhabitants.

Únice lies approximately 7 kilometres (4 mi) north-west of Strakonice, 59 km (37 mi) north-west of České Budějovice, and 95 km (59 mi) south-west of Prague.

== Administrative division ==
Únice consists of two municipal parts (in brackets population according to the 2021 census):

- Únice (16)
- Hubenov (48)

== Demographics ==
Historical population
Year	Pop.	±%
1869	202	—
1880	214	+5.9%
1890	220	+2.8%
1900	177	−19.5%
1910	158	−10.7%
1921	164	+3.8%
1930	141	−14.0%
1950	119	−15.6%
1961	100	−16.0%
1970	82	−18.0%
1980	60	−26.8%
1991	41	−31.7%
2001	42	+2.4%
2011	58	+38.1%
2021	64	+10.3%
Source: Censuses
