= Infinity Plus =

Science fiction webzine active from 1997 to 2007

Infinity Plus (sometimes stylized as infinity plus and infinityplus) was a science fiction webzine active from 1997 to 2007, specializing in reviews, interviews, and professionally written fiction. It was founded by Keith Brooke (who took a "deliberately elitist approach"); Nick Gevers and Paul Barnett were associate editors. As of 2018, it continues to exist as a small press.

Brian Stableford declared it to be the "leading sf site in the United Kingdom", and SF Signal called it "informative and insightful".
