= EUNIS =

EUNIS is an abbreviation for

- European Nature Information System
- European University Information Systems Organization
- Extreme Ultraviolet Normal Incidence Spectrograph, a sounding rocket instrument for observing the solar corona.
