= On the Steel Breeze =

Science fiction novel by Alastair Reynolds

- Hardcover edition
- Author: Alastair Reynolds
- Language: English
- Genre: Science fiction novel
- Publisher: Gollancz
- Publication date: 26 September 2013
- Publication place: United Kingdom
- Media type: Print (hardcover and paperback); E-book; Audiobook
- Preceded by: Blue Remembered Earth
- Followed by: Poseidon's Wake

On the Steel Breeze is a science fiction novel by Welsh author Alastair Reynolds, which was first published by Gollancz on 26 September 2013. It is the second part of Reynolds' future history Poseidon's Children trilogy, following his 2012 novel Blue Remembered Earth. On the Steel Breeze was followed on 30 April 2015 by the concluding novel of the trilogy, Poseidon's Wake.

== Plot summary ==
On the Steel Breeze is set in the 24th century, 200 years after the events of Blue Remembered Earth. It depicts a massive interstellar colonization effort, involving hundreds of immense generation ships known as "holoships" carrying millions of humans to extrasolar planets. The holoships are propelled to relativistic velocities by engines based on exotic "Chibesa physics", but are in danger of overshooting their target planets due to a lack of fuel for deceleration. Meanwhile, the ocean-dwelling transhumans of the United Aquatic Nations have become one of Earth's pre-eminent powers, and the colonization of Venus is underway.

The novel's main characters are two clones of Chiku Akinya, the daughter of one of the main characters of Blue Remembered Earth. The original Chiku had herself cloned centuries before to allow her to experience three different lifestyles. One clone, Chiku Yellow, remained on Earth, while the second, Chiku Green, embarked on a holoship heading for the alien planet of Crucible, which is home to a mysterious structure known as the Mandala. A third clone, Chiku Red, was lost attempting to find her famous great-grandmother Eunice Akinya in deep space. Chiku Green faces a series of revelations after a strange accident kills hundreds aboard her holoship, while Chiku Yellow is haunted by a cybernetic "ghost", leading her to seek out a powerful transhuman on Venus.

== Reception ==
Michael Flett of GeekChocolate.co.uk described On the Steel Breeze as "satisfying and rounded" with "fascinating" protagonists, though he stated that the plot "occasionally drags". SciFiEmpire.net also gave the novel a positive review, praising Reynolds' ability to "combine previously divergent storylines into one epic conclusion". Alex Good of the Toronto Star praised the book, saying that "few SF writers merge rousing adventure with advanced futuristic technology as skilfully as Alastair Reynolds". Paul Kincaid of SFSite.com wrote that although "[On the Steel Breeze] is far from being the best novel Reynolds has written...[it] displays many of his real strengths as a writer of large-scale science fiction...and there is more than enough intrigue to ensure we come back for the next volume."
