= Shadow Captain (novel) =

2019 novel by Alastair Reynolds

- Author: Alastair Reynolds
- Language: English
- Series: Revenger Trilogy
- Genre: Space opera
- Publisher: Gollancz
- Publication date: 10 January 2019
- Publication place: United Kingdom
- Media type: Print (hardback & paperback)
- Pages: 432 (hardcover)
- ISBN: 978-0-5750-9066-8
- Preceded by: Revenger
- Followed by: Bone Silence

Shadow Captain, by British author Alastair Reynolds, is the second book in the Revenger trilogy that began with the novel Revenger, published in 2016.

Shadow Captain takes place in a setting 10 million years in the future called The Congregation, where the Solar System has been through thirteen "Occupations" that has reduced the planets to rubble and rebuilt it into its current state, a collection of 50 million micro-worlds, with 20,000 of them occupied by the remnants of humanity and alien species.

While Revenger is told from the first person perspective of Arafura Ness, Shadow Captain is told from the first person perspective of her older sister, Adrana.

The final book in the trilogy, Bone Silence, was published in 2020.

== Plot summary ==
Three months after the events of the novel Revenger, Arafura ('Fura') Ness finds herself in command of the Revenger. They break into a bauble in order to raid a cache of fuel. Barely escaping 'twinkle-heads' found inside, they retreat back to space. Surt and Adrana believe they are being followed by another ship, but Fura dismisses the concern. A book is found on board that documents the history of Occupations, but in addition there is a second timeline that hints at the existence of "Shadow Occupations".

Revenger is struck by a photon storm, and it's decided they should travel to Wheel Strizzardy (a wheel world) on the outer reaches of the Congregation. While en route they are shot at by the still hidden ship trailing them and as a result Strambli accidentally badly wounds herself with a Ghostie blade out on the hull. Arriving at Wheel Strizzardy the crew take on fake identities and bribe their way onto the station. Strambli is given over to the care of Dr. Eddralder. The crew meets with Mister Glimmery who is infected with the "glowy" like Fura, in his presence is an alien Crawly named Cuttle. Afterwards they are escorted by Sneed to another part of the wheel to find accommodations.

The crew goes out to secure supplies, but when they return they find Cuttle skulking near their rooms. Cuttle falls off a balcony and dies. Adrana and Prozor are accused of his murder by two Crawlies who show up on the scene. While on the station Fura manages to capture Lagganvor, a former associate of Bosa Sennen, who knows the whereabouts of The Miser, a bauble holding Bosa's cache of quoins.

Merrix is Dr. Eddralder's daughter and is being used by Glimmery to ensure he is not poisoned by the doctor's glowy treatments. But Eddralder ends up slipping a poison to Glimmery anyway. Eddralder leaves six syringes with an antidote, and joins the crew of the Revenger with Merrix, promising to radio back how to cure the poison. Lagganvor also goes along with the crew.

They travel to The Miser and once inside they find trams that hold more quoins than any of them have ever seen. As the trams near the central chamber the quoins begin glowing bright white and emit a scream that's heard inside their heads. They separate the trams and find that the quoins have been reset to seemingly random denominations. Returning to Revenger they discover the same is true throughout the 20,000 worlds, and fear that this financial event may cause the end of the Thirteenth Occupation.

Adrana works out that Lagganvor is Pol Rackamore's brother (Brysca) who took on the identity to get revenge for his brother's death. Their plan at the end is to go into hiding by pursuing the object that Adrana believes is orbiting the Old Sun at intervals coinciding with Shadow Occupations.

=== Crew of the Revenger ===
- Arafura 'Fura' Ness - Captain of the Revenger, bone reader, infected with the "glowy" after consuming lightvine.
- Adrana Ness - Older sister of Fura, bone reader, narrator of Shadow Captain.
- Prozor - Crew member of the Mourn and a Scanner (bauble reader).
- Strambli - Bauble Cracker
- Tindouf - Master of Ions.
- Surt - Crew member and Integrator (technician).
- Paladin - Fura and Adrana's family robot, a relic of the Twelfth Occupation (Epoch of Robots), now integrated into the systems of Revenger.

=== Other characters ===
- Glimmery - Leader of Wheel Strizzardy, infected with the "glowy".
- Sneed - One of Glimmery's henchman.
- Doctor Eddralder - Runs an infirmary on Wheel Strizzardy.
- Merrix - A young girl in the service of Glimmery. Daughter of Doctor Eddralder.
- Cuttle - An alien (Crawly) somehow linked to Mister Glimmery.
- Scrabble - A Crawly on Wheel Strizzardy
- Fiddle - A Crawly on Wheel Strizzardy
- Lagganvor - A former associate and crewman of Bosa Sennen who knows the whereabouts of her secret quoin cache.
- Chasco - Bone reader aboard the White Widow.

== Reception ==
Paul Di Filippo at Locus Online gives a generally favorable review of Shadow Captain, saying: "what Reynolds is really doing is channeling some of the great writers from what David Pringle calls the Age of Storytellers–Dickens, Stevenson, Sabatini, Dumas–into space opera form [...] This second installment is a highly entertaining and worthy successor to Revenger."

SFFWorld rates the novel favorably and says the following: "Whilst there are clichés (it is, after all, space pirates!) there were times when I genuinely wasn’t sure where this was going to go. I will now wait impatiently for the third novel."

Tor.com contrasts the slow start of the novel with a strong finish and abundance of worldbuilding. "[...] as the decaying relationship of the sisters Ness takes centre stage, and our understanding of the Congregation is roundly reshaped, Shadow Captain goes from strength to strength, setting the scene for a conclusion that has a real chance of recapturing the vim and the vigour of volume one."

== References to music ==
Many of Reynolds' novels and stories make reference to the progressive rock genre. Shadow Captain is a song off the Crosby, Stills & Nash album CSN (1977). When asked by a fan if there is "Any reference there, subtle or otherwise" between the title of the book and the title of the song, Alastair Reynolds confirmed with "Yes, it's a wonderful song and the lyrics (trying to give the light the slip, etc) seemed to resonate well with the mood of the novel."
