= Poseidon's Wake =

Book by Alastair Reynolds

- Hardcover edition
- Author: Alastair Reynolds
- Language: English
- Genre: Science fiction novel
- Publisher: Gollancz
- Publication date: 30 April 2015
- Publication place: United Kingdom
- Media type: Print (hardcover and paperback); E-book; Audiobook
- Pages: 608 pp.
- Preceded by: On the Steel Breeze

Poseidon's Wake is a science fiction novel by Welsh author Alastair Reynolds. It forms the conclusion of Reynolds' Poseidon's Children future history trilogy, which follows the expansion of humanity and its transhuman descendants into the galaxy over the course of many centuries. Poseidon's Wake follows Blue Remembered Earth (2012) and On the Steel Breeze (2013), and was published by Gollancz on 30 April 2015.

== Background ==
Reynolds submitted the manuscript of Poseidon's Wake to Gollancz in October 2014, and completed his editorial revisions in November 2014. Gollancz released the novel's cover art and announced its print and digital release date in January 2015.

== Plot introduction ==
Poseidon's Wake is a loose sequel to Reynolds' 2013 novel On the Steel Breeze, featuring numerous recurring characters, but can also be considered a stand-alone story. Set in the distant future, after humans have travelled to other stars and encountered mysterious robotic aliens known as Watchkeepers, the novel depicts an expedition by interstellar colonists to a mysterious solar system which contains an ancient and devastating secret.

== Reception ==
Erlingur Einarsson of SciFiNow gave Poseidon's Wake a highly favourable review, describing it as "grand, involving and full of light and wonder" and naming it "one of the best sci-fi novels of the year", while acknowledging that it was more slow-paced than other science fiction works. Eric Brown of The Guardian also reviewed the novel favourably, calling it "a well-paced, complex story replete with intrigue, invention and an optimism uncommon in contemporary SF". Mark Diston of The Register was far more critical of the novel, describing it as "pedestrian, long-winded and ineffective" and saying that Reynolds' characters lack "life [and] humour".
