= One Million A.D. =

2005 anthology edited by Gardner Dozois

- First edition
- Author: Edited by Gardner Dozois
- Cover artist: Bob Eggleton
- Language: English
- Genre: Science fiction
- Publisher: Science Fiction Book Club
- Publication date: 2005; 21 years ago
- Publication place: United States
- Media type: Print (Hardcover)
- Pages: 399
- ISBN: 0-7394-6273-3
- OCLC: 63178197
- LC Class: PS648.S3 O54 2005

One Million A.D. is a science fiction anthology edited by American writer Gardner Dozois, published in 2005.

The book may be the first anthology of stories focused on the far future.

== Contents ==
- Robert Reed: "Good Mountain"
- Robert Silverberg: "A Piece of the Great World"
- Nancy Kress: "Mirror Image"
- Alastair Reynolds: "Thousandth Night"
- Charles Stross: "Missile Gap"
- Greg Egan: "Riding the Crocodile"

== Notes ==
The contents, made up of six novellas, were commissioned for this book and published here for the first time. The book also begins with a three-page introduction by Dozois.

The setting of Reynolds's story was later used as the setting for the novel House of Suns.

== See also ==
- Science Fiction Book Club original anthology series
