= Keith Brooke =

English writer and publisher

Keith Brooke is a British science fiction author, editor, web publisher and anthologist from Suffolk, England. He is the founder and editor of the infinity plus webzine. He also writes children's fiction under the name Nick Gifford.

== Biography and publishing history ==
Keith Brooke studied environmental science at university, and took a year out after graduating to write a novel. That novel, Keepers of the Peace, was published by Gollancz in 1990. He remained a full-time writer for some eight years, before finding work in various multimedia, web development and editorial roles at the Cheltenham and Gloucester College of Higher Education (now the University of Gloucestershire) and the University of Essex; in 2014 he returned to full-time writing and editing.

Brooke's first story was published in the British small press magazine Dream in 1989, but it was his first sale to Interzone, the story 'Adenotropic Man', which first brought him notice. He continued to be published in Interzone throughout the 1990s. There was, however, a nine-year gap between his third novel, Expatria Incorporated, and his fourth, Lord of Stone (although the latter was originally published on-line in 1997). In 2001 and 2002, US-based Cosmos Books published Brooke's three novels from the early 1990s in their first US editions. 2006 saw publication of Genetopia, achieving publisher Pyr's first ever starred review in Publishers Weekly. His 2009 novel The Accord picked up a second starred PW review. His 2012 novel, Harmony (published in the UK as alt.human) was shortlisted for the Philip K Dick Award.

In August 1997, Brooke founded the Infinity Plus website, publishing original and reprinted science fiction book reviews and stories. He continued regular updates for the next ten years, all of which appeared for free. Brooke invited hundreds of SF authors to showcase their work, beginning with several well-known British authors but eventually including newer authors and many from other countries. Regular updates to the site ceased in August 2007, although the archive is still available.

In 2010, Brooke relaunched Infinity Plus as an independent publishing imprint, publishing SF, fantasy, horror and crime fiction by Eric Brown, Kaitlin Queen, Molly Brown, John Grant, Anna Tambour, Garry Kilworth and others, including Brooke himself. Originally an ebook publisher, infinity plus began producing paperback editions in 2012.

Also in 2010, Brooke completed his PhD at the University of Essex: Genetopia: The Emergence of Story, the Emergence of Theme. Since 2007 he has taught creative writing at Essex, specialising in novel-writing and science fiction, at undergraduate and postgraduate levels.

In 2012, Palgrave Macmillan published Strange Divisions and Alien Territories: The Sub-genres of Science Fiction [sic], a non-fiction book edited by Brooke which explores the subgenres of science fiction from the perspectives of a range of top SF authors. Combining a critical viewpoint with the exploration of the challenges and opportunities facing authors working in the field, the book's contributors are: Michael Swanwick, Gary Gibson, Alastair Reynolds, Justina Robson, Catherine Asaro and Kate Dolan, John Grant, Kristine Kathryn Rusch, James Lovegrove, Adam Roberts, Keith Brooke, James Patrick Kelly, Paul Di Filippo and Tony Ballantyne.

Brooke also publishes teen fiction under the pen-name Nick Gifford, with four novels published by Puffin between 2003 and 2006. A fifth Gifford novel, Tomorrow, was published by infinity plus in 2014, described by the publishers as a "time-tangled thriller set in the War Against Chronological Terror ... when three teenagers may have the power to save or destroy a world that is yet to be".

== Bibliography ==
=== Novels ===
- Keepers of the Peace. London: Gollancz, 1990. ISBN 0-575-04907-3.
- Expatria
  - Expatria. London: Gollancz, 1991. ISBN 0-575-04921-9.
  - Expatria Incorporated. London: Gollancz, 1992. ISBN 0-575-04922-7.
- Lord of Stone. Canton, OH: Cosmos Books, 2001. ISBN 1-58715-334-3.
- Genetopia. Amherst, NY: Pyr, 2006. ISBN 1-59102-333-5.
- The Accord. Nottingham: Solaris, 2009. ISBN 978-1-84416-710-4.
- The Unlikely World of Faraway Frankie. Cambridge: Newcon Press, 2010. ISBN 978-1-907069-13-0.
- alt.human. Oxford: Solaris, 2012. ISBN 978-1781080023
  - variant title for North American edition: Harmony. Oxford: Solaris, 2012. ISBN 978-1781080016.

=== Young adult novels (published under the pen-name Nick Gifford) ===
- Piggies. London: Puffin, 2003. Colchester: infinite press, 2013. ISBN 978-1494360719.
- Flesh and Blood. London: Puffin, 2004. Colchester: infinite press, 2013. ISBN 978-1493692149.
- Incubus. London: Puffin, 2005.
  - variant title for infinite press edition (reverting to the author's preferred title): Like Father. Colchester: infinite press, 2013. ISBN 978-1-4943-6122-8.
- Erased. London: Puffin, 2006. Colchester: infinite press, 2013. ISBN 978-1494363611.
- Tomorrow. Colchester: infinity plus, 2014. ISBN 978-1495955259.

=== Collections ===
- Parallax View, with Eric Brown. Mountain Ash, Wales: Sarob Press, 2000. ISBN 1-902309-12-X.
- Head Shots. Canton, OH: Cosmos Books, 2001 (paper). ISBN 1-58715-387-4.
- Parallax View (revised edition with new content), with Eric Brown. Stafford, England: Immanion Press, 2007. ISBN 1-904853-42-0.
- Embrace: tales from the dark side. (infinity plus ebooks).
- Segue: into the strange. (infinity plus ebooks).
- Faking It: accounts of the General Genetics Corporation. (infinity plus ebooks).
- Liberty Spin: tales of scientifiction. (infinity plus ebooks).
- Memesis: modification and other strange changes. (infinity plus ebooks).

=== As editor ===
- Strange Divisions and Alien Territories: The Sub-genres of Science Fiction. Basingstoke: Palgrave Macmillan, 2012. ISBN 978-0230249677.

With Nick Gevers he has edited the following anthologies:

- Infinity Plus one. Harrogate: PS Publishing, 2001. ISBN 1-902880-23-4.
- Infinity Plus two. Harrogate: PS Publishing, 2003. ISBN 1-902880-58-7.
- Infinity Plus. Nottingham: Solaris Books, 2007. ISBN 978-1-84416-489-9.

=== Short non-fiction ===
- "Story behind 'Genetopia' - A short story a novel and seventeen years of writing" (2013), from "Story Behind the Book: Volume 1"
