= Nick Gevers =

South African science fiction editor and critic

- Born: 1965 (age 60–61); Oxford, England
- Education: PhD (Social and Political Science)
- Occupations: Writer, Editor

Nick Gevers (born 1965) is a South African science fiction editor and critic, whose work has appeared in The Washington Post Book World, Interzone, SciFi.com, SF Site, The New York Review of Science Fiction and Nova Express. He wrote two regular review columns for Locus magazine from 2001 to 2008, and is editor at the British independent press, PS Publishing; he also edits the quarterly genre fiction magazine, Postscripts.

Gevers was co-editor, with Keith Brooke, of the science fiction anthologies Infinity Plus One (2001) and Infinity Plus Two (2003) and in August 2007 released the combined Infinity Plus through Solaris Books. His first original anthology, Extraordinary Engines, was published by Solaris Books in October 2008, and a second, Other Earths (co-edited with Jay Lake), by DAW Books in Spring 2009. Subsequent original anthologies are This is the Summer of Love, Enemy of the Good, and Edison's Frankenstein (all 2009, from PS Publishing, co-edited with Peter Crowther), as well as The Book of Dreams (Subterranean Press, 2010); forthcoming are Is Anybody Out There? (DAW, June 2010, co-edited with Marty Halpern), The Company He Keeps (PS Publishing, 2010, co-edited with Peter Crowther), and Ghosts by Gaslight (Harper Colline Eos, 2011, co-edited with Jack Dann).

Gevers served as a judge for the Sidewise Award for Alternate History from 2004 through 2008.

== Awards ==
- Shirley Jackson Award Edited Anthology: Ghosts by Gaslight, edited by Jack Dann and Nick Gevers (Harper Voyager)
