= Eric Brown (writer) =

British science fiction author (1960–2023)

Eric Brown (24 May 1960 – 21 March 2023) was a British science fiction author and The Guardian critic.

== Biography ==
Eric Brown was born in Haworth, Yorkshire, in May 1960, and began writing in 1975. In the 1980s he travelled extensively throughout Greece and Asia (some of his novels are set in India). His first publication was in 1982, when his play for children Noel's Ark appeared.

His career took off in the late 1980s with a succession of short stories in the magazine Interzone and other publications. His story "The Time-Lapsed Man" won the Interzone readers' poll for the most admired story of 1988, and an Eastercon short text award in 1995. He was voted the Best New European SF writer of the Year in the early 1990s and subsequently won the BSFA Award twice (for the short stories "Hunting the Slarque" in 1999 and "Children of Winter" in 2001).

Brown publicly admired the science fiction writing of Michael G. Coney, Robert Silverberg, Richard Paul Russo and Robert Charles Wilson, amongst others.

Brown died from sepsis on 21 March 2023, at the age of 62.

== Bibliography ==
=== Novels ===
- Meridian Days. London: Pan, 1992 (paper). ISBN 9780330322874
- Engineman. London: Pan, 1994 (paper). ISBN 9780330330435
- Penumbra. London: Millennium, 1999 (paper). ISBN 9781857985924
- the Virex trilogy
  - New York Nights. London: Gollancz, 2000. ISBN 9780575068728
  - New York Blues. London: Gollancz, 2001. ISBN 9780575068735
  - New York Dreams. London: Gollancz, 2004 (paper). ISBN 9780575074941
- Bengal Station. Waterville, ME: Five Star Books, 2004. ISBN 9781594142123
- Helix. Nottingham: Solaris Books, 2007 (paper). ISBN 9781844164721
- Kéthani. Nottingham: Solaris Books, 2008 (paper). ISBN 9781844164738
- Bengal Station
  - Necropath. Nottingham: Solaris Books, 2009 (paper). ISBN 9781844166497
  - Xenopath. Nottingham: Solaris Books, 2010 (paper). ISBN 9781844167425
  - Cosmopath. Nottingham: Solaris Books, 2010 (paper). ISBN 9781844168323
- Engineman. Nottingham: Solaris Books, 2010 (paper). ISBN 9781907519420
- Guardians of the Phoenix. Nottingham: Solaris Books, 2010 (paper). ISBN 9781907519147
- The Kings of Eternity. Nottingham: Solaris Books, 2011 (paper). ISBN 9781907519710
- Weird Space: The Devil's Nebula. Abaddon, 2012 (paper). ISBN 9781781080238
- Helix Wars. Nottingham: Solaris Books, 2012 (paper). ISBN 9781781080498
- Serene Invasion. Abaddon, 2013 (paper). ISBN 9781781080924
- Weird Space: Satan's Reach. Abaddon, 2013 (paper). ISBN 9781781081310
- Weird Space: The Baba Yaga. Abaddon, 2015 (paper). ISBN 9781781083642
- The Further Adventures of Sherlock Holmes: The Martian Menace. Titan Books, 2020. ISBN 9781789092950
- Buying Time (writing as E.M.Brown). Solaris, 2018.

ISBN 9781781086636

=== Novellas ===
- A Writer's Life. Harrogate: PS Publishing, 2001. ISBN 9781902880211
- Approaching Omega. Tolworth, Surrey: Telos Publishing, 2005. ISBN 9781903889992
- The Extraordinary Voyage of Jules Verne. Harrogate: PS Publishing, 2005. ISBN 9781904619352
- Gilbert and Edgar on Mars. Hornsea: PS Publishing, 2009. ISBN 9781906301675
- Starship
  - Starship Summer. Harrogate: PS Publishing, 2007. ISBN 9781905834495
  - Starship Fall. Harrogate: NewCon Press, 2009. ISBN 9781907069024
  - Starship Winter. Harrogate: PS Publishing, 2012. ISBN 9781848633148
  - Starship Spring. Harrogate: PS Publishing, 2012. ISBN 9781848634886
  - Starship Coda. Harrogate: PS Publishing, 2016. ISBN 9781848639799
- The Telemass Quartet
  - Famadihana on Fomalhaut IV. Harrogate: PS Publishing, 2014. ISBN 9781848637610
  - Sacrifice on Spica III. Harrogate: PS Publishing, 2014. ISBN 9781848637894
  - Reunion on Alpha Reticuli II. Harrogate: PS Publishing, 2016. ISBN 9781848639768
  - Exalted on Bellatrix 1. Harrogate: PS Publishing, 2017. ISBN 9781786361059
  - Telemass Coda. Harrogate: PS Publishing, 2019. ISBN 9781786364227
- The Kon-tiki Quartet, with Keith Brooke
  - Dislocations. Harrogate: PS Publishing, 2018. ISBN 9781786363145
  - Parasites. Harrogate: PS Publishing, 2018. ISBN 9781786363473
  - Insights. Harrogate: PS Publishing, 2019. ISBN 9781786363763

=== Collections ===
- The Time-Lapsed Man and Other Stories. London: Pan, 1990 (paper). ISBN 9780330313667
- Blue Shifting. London: Pan, 1995 (paper). ISBN 9780330335904
- Parallax View, with Keith Brooke. Mountain Ash, Wales: Sarob Press, 2000. ISBN 9781902309125
- Deep Future. Canton, OH: Cosmos Books, 2001. ISBN 9781587154416
- The Fall of Tartarus. London: Gollancz, 2005 (paper). ISBN 9780575076181
- Threshold Shift. Urbana, IL: Golden Gryphon Press, 2006. ISBN 9781930846432
- Parallax View, with Keith Brooke. Stafford: Immanion Press, 2007 (paper). ISBN 9781904853428
- Salvage. Infinity Plus Books, 2013 (paper).
- Starship Seasons. Harrogate: PS Publishing, 2013. ISBN 9781848636026 - A collection of the first four Starship novellas.

=== Children's books ===
- The Web
  - Untouchable. London: Dolphin, 1997 (paper). ISBN 9781858814261
  - Walkabout. London: Dolphin, 1999 (paper). ISBN 9781858816432
- Twocking. Edinburgh: Barrington Stoke, 2002 (paper). ISBN 9781842990421
- Firebug. Edinburgh: Barrington Stoke, 2003 (paper). ISBN 9781842991039
- British Front. Edinburgh: Barrington Stoke, 2005 (paper). ISBN 9781842992876
- Space Ace. Edinburgh: Barrington Stoke, 2005 (paper). ISBN 9781842992944
- Crazy Love. Edinburgh: Barrington Stoke, 2006 (paper). ISBN 9781842993675
- Revenge (Most Wanted). Edinburgh: Barrington Stoke, 2007 (paper). ISBN 9781842995006

== External resources ==
- Official website
- Eric Brown at the Internet Speculative Fiction Database
- Eric Brown's online fiction at Free Speculative Fiction Online
- Infinity Plus has a short profile of Eric Brown, as well as an interview conducted by Keith Brooke and an earlier conversation between the two, and Brooke's introduction to Brown's collection Deep Future.
- Fantastic Fiction page on Eric Brown
- Ghostwriting review
- Serene Invasion review
- Eric Brown : Story behind The Serene Invasion - Online Essay at Upcoming4.me
- Eric Brown : Story behind Satan's Reach - Online Essay at Upcoming4.me
- Eric Brown : Story behind Salvage - Online Essay at Upcoming4.me
- Eric Brown : Story behind Murder by the Book - Online Essay at Upcoming4.me
- The story behind Jani and the Greater Game - Essay by Eric Brown at Upcoming4.me
