= Ruth Nestvold =

American novelist

Ruth Nestvold (born 1958) is an American Science fiction and Fantasy writer.

== Biography ==
Born in the state of Washington and raised in Oregon, she now lives in Stuttgart, Germany, where she works in technical translation and localization. Nestvold is a graduate of Clarion West Writers Workshop 1998.

== Works ==
Her first professional publication was "Latency Time," published in Asimov's Science Fiction in 2001. This work was recommended for 2001 reading in Locus Magazine.

Since then, her short fiction has appeared in numerous publications, including Realms of Fantasy, Sci Fiction, Strange Horizons, Futurismic, and several year's best anthologies. In 2004, her novella "Looking Through Lace" was short-listed for the Tiptree Award and nominated for the Sturgeon Award. In 2007, the Italian translation Il linguaggio segreto won the "Premio Italia" Award for best work of science fiction or fantasy translated into Italian in 2006. Her short story "Mars: A Traveler’s Guide" was a finalist for the 2008 Nebula Award for Best Short Story. She is also a regular contributor to The Internet Review of Science Fiction.

Her hyperfiction includes

- Cutting Edges: Or, A Web of Women (1995), released in a DOS version and featured in the Virtual Progressive Dinner Party (2000) edited by M.D. Coverley and preserved in WSUV's The NEXT Museum, Library, and Preservation Space.
- "Triple Helix," Ideomancer, (June 2006)
- Joe's Heartbeat in Budapest (2007)
