= House of Suns =

2008 novel by Alastair Reynolds

- Cover for House of Suns
- Author: Alastair Reynolds
- Cover artist: Chris Moore
- Language: English
- Genre: Science fiction
- Publisher: Gollancz
- Publication date: April 17, 2008
- Publication place: United Kingdom
- Media type: Print (hardcover and paperback)
- Pages: 473
- ISBN: 0-575-07717-4
- OCLC: 187294071

House of Suns is a 2008 science fiction novel by Welsh author Alastair Reynolds. The novel was shortlisted for the 2009 Arthur C. Clarke Award.

== Setting ==
Approximately six million years in the future, humanity has spread throughout the Milky Way galaxy, which appears devoid of any other organic sentient life. The galaxy is populated by numerous civilizations of humans and posthumans of widely varying levels of development. A civilization of sentient robots known as the Machine People coexists peacefully with humanity. Technologies of the era include anti-gravity, inertia damping, force fields, stellar engineering, and stasis fields. Also of note is the "Absence"—the mysterious disappearance of the Andromeda Galaxy.

Large-scale human civilizations almost invariably seem to collapse and disappear within a few millennia (a phenomenon referred to as "turnover"), the limits of sub-lightspeed travel making it too difficult to hold interstellar empires together. Consequently, the most powerful entities in the galaxy are the "Lines"—familial organizations made of cloned "shatterlings". The Lines do not inhabit planets, but instead travel through space, holding reunions after they have performed a "circuit" of the galaxy; something that takes about 200,000 years.

House of Suns concerns the Gentian Line, also known as the House of Flowers, composed of Abigail Gentian and her 999 clones (or "shatterlings"), male and female: exactly which of the 1,000 shatterlings is the original Abigail Gentian is unknown. The clones and Abigail travel the Milky Way Galaxy, helping young civilizations, collecting knowledge, and experiencing what the universe has to offer. Members of the Gentian Line are named after flowering plants.

== Synopsis ==
The novel is divided into eight parts, with the first chapter of each part taking the form of a narrative flashback to Abigail Gentian's early life (six million years earlier, in the 31st century), before the cloning and the creation of the Gentian Line. Each subsequent chapter is narrated from the first-person perspective of two shatterlings named Campion and Purslane, alternating between them each chapter. Campion and Purslane are in a relationship, which is frowned upon, even punishable, by the Line.

The primary storyline begins as Campion and Purslane are roughly fifty years late to the 32nd Gentian reunion. They detour to procure a replacement for Campion's several million year old ship from the posthuman "Ateshga". The shatterlings are tricked by Ateshga but escape with Hesperus, a member of the Machine People held captive by Ateshga. The shatterlings hope that Hesperus's rescue will excuse their tardiness and improve relations between the Gentian Line and the Machine People.

The shatterlings and Hesperus travel to the reunion world; they are forewarned by an emergency signal that the reunion has been attacked by unknown parties using "Homunculus" weapons – ancient monstrous spacetime-bending weapons that were ordered destroyed by another Line. Several Gentian survivors and four prisoners are rescued; Hesperus is critically wounded. They travel to Neume, the backup reunion world, and rendezvous with around forty other Gentians - there were once hundreds before the attack - and two Machine people guests, Cadence and Cascade. Soon after another Gentian is murdered; the Gentians suspect a traitor is responsible. Purslane is forced to give Silver Wings of Morning, her ship and one of the Line's best, to Cadence and Cascade, ostensibly so that they can return to the Machine People and seek assistance for the Line; the transfer is actually to punish Campion for transgressions against the Line. Hesperus is taken to "Spirit of the Air", an ancient Neumean posthuman machine-intelligence, for repairs. Hesperus is still non-functional when returned; unknown to the Gentians he has become an amalgamation of Hesperus and "Spirit".

Purslane, Cadence and Cascade board Silver Wings to execute the control transfer procedure; Hesperus is brought aboard for transport back to the Machine People. Hesperus reactivates and warns Purslane that Cadence and Cascade plan to hijack the ship; the other robots hack the ship's computer and takeoff. Campion and some other shatterlings, including Galingale, immediately pursue. Purslane and Hesperus hide in a smaller ship carried by Silver Wings. Hesperus determines that Cadence and Cascade discovered that the Line participated in the accidental genocide of the "First Machines", an earlier but more advanced machine people. The Commonality, a confederation of Lines, expunged the evidence of the event in shame, and hunted down the remaining First Machines in fear of retribution. Evidence of the event was unwittingly recovered by Campion in a previous circuit. Hesperus believes that the attack on the reunion was an attempt to suppress the evidence by the "House of Suns", a shadow Line tasked with maintaining the conspiracy. Silver Wings travels toward a wormhole leading to the Andromeda Galaxy where some First Machines escaped to. Cadence and Cascade plan to form an alliance between the Machine People and the First Machines to exterminate humans. The wormhole is blocked by a Gentian "stardam" and Silver Wings carries the opener. During the pursuit, Galingale is exposed as the traitor working for the House of Suns and is captured by the other pursuers.

The pursuit lasts thousands of years over sixty thousand light years. During this time Campion and Purslane go into a form of temporal stasis. Hesperus destroys Cadence and defeats Cascade, but its control of the ship is limited by Cascade's sabotage; the ship attacks anything attempting to stop it and the course to the wormhole cannot be changed. Hesperus' warnings allow Lines and local civilizations to mobilize a blockade of the wormhole, but the ship fights its way through, opens the stardam and travels to Andromeda. The ship is badly damaged by the wormhole transit and is abandoned in orbit over a First Machine planet; the planet orbits a star enclosed in a megastructure modelled after the Platonic solids. Hesperus sacrifices its personality and memories to become a landing pod large enough for Purslane; they are placed into stasis on the surface by the "glass man", a machine entity claiming to be the last First Machine in Andromeda. Campion, the only shatterling to survive the pursuit, also travels through the wormhole but arrives in Andromeda 18,000 years later because of the wormhole's relative youth and instability. He follows a Gentian signal from Hesperus to the First Machine planet and meets the glass man on the surface. According to the glass man, the First Machines forgive the Commonality for the genocide and are journeying via wormholes to the Boötes Void in search of more advanced civilizations. The glass man takes Campion to Hesperus and Purslane, who are still alive in stasis, and offers to help revive them before departing.

== Connections to previous works ==
The novel is set in the same fictional setting as Reynolds' novella "Thousandth Night", which appears in the anthology One Million A.D.. Reynolds has stated on his blog that the longer work "does not attempt slavish consistency" with "Thousandth Night".

A number of characters killed in the novella make an appearance in the novel.

== Reception ==
Lisa Tuttle, reviewing for The Times, called the novel a "thrilling, mind-boggling adventure" with "visionary brilliance" and a "knock-your-socks-off ending". Zack Handlen of The A.V. Club wrote that Reynolds is particularly adept at conveying the vastness of space and the "inky blackness of the void", adding that House of Suns "keeps up the tradition of forward thinking while improving on the genre’s traditionally flat prose and clumsily drawn women. An immensely thrilling, mind-bending piece of work, House looks to the center of all that emptiness and finds its beating heart".

At SF Signal, one reviewer noted that a "sense of wonder is where this book excels", adding that "Reynolds is playing on a galactic-sized canvas and uses believable science to back up his grand ideas...[t]his yields mind-boggling time scales, where millennia pass by like days".

George Williams, in his review for The Australian, said that "the concepts explored in House of Suns are so far removed from our time, and even from much of the standard fare of science fiction, that parts of the book border on fantasy. The author does carry off a story conceived on a scale rarely seen in science fiction. The weaknesses of the book relate to some old staples of novel writing. While the pace picks up at the end, it starts too slowly and at times the plot meanders. The novel may be filled with rich ideas, but neither of the two leads compels interest and the relationship between them is underdeveloped. It is a pity that these aspects of the book fail to achieve the same heights as the universe in which it is set".
