= Professor Moriarty in other media =

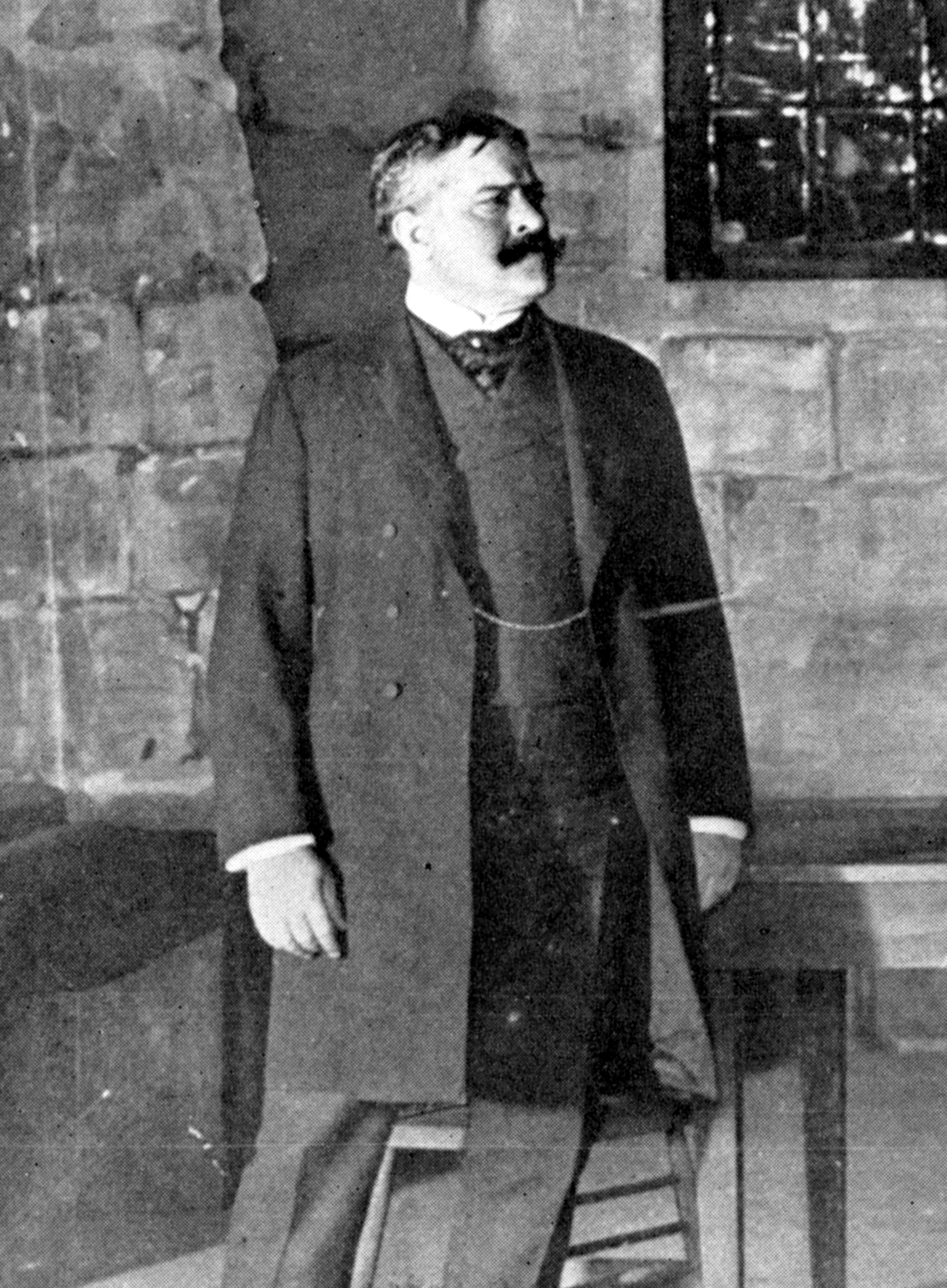
George Wessells was the first actor to portray Moriarty, opposite William Gillette in the Broadway production Sherlock Holmes (1899)

Professor James Moriarty is the fictional archenemy of Sherlock Holmes in some of the stories written by Sir Arthur Conan Doyle. He has appeared in several forms outside of the original stories.

== Theatre ==
- In the William Gillette play, Sherlock Holmes, Moriarty was played on Broadway in the original (1899–1900) run by George Wessells (and again in 1905), then by Frank Keenan (1928), John Miltern (1929–30) and Philip Locke, Clive Revill and Alan Sues from 1974 to 1976.
- In the play Sherlock Holmes by Ouida Bergère (wife of actor Basil Rathbone), which ran at the New Century Theatre in New York City for only three performances from 30 to 31 October 1953, Moriarty was played by Thomas Gomez.
- Jeremy Brett and Edward Hardwicke, who played Holmes and Watson in the Granada Television series The Adventures of Sherlock Holmes (1984–94), reprised their roles for Jeremy Paul's revisionist stage play, The Secret of Sherlock Holmes (1988–89). The only characters in the play are Holmes and Watson, and it highlights many aspects of their relationship from their first meeting to the Reichenbach Falls. In the second half, it is indicated that Moriarty never existed: he was a figment of Holmes' imagination, as the detective needed a worthy enemy as much as he needed a devoted friend like Watson.

== Radio and podcasts ==
- Louis Hector played the villain in numerous episodes of NBC's The Adventures of Sherlock Holmes (1934-1935).
- Orson Welles played Professor Moriarty opposite Sir John Gielgud's Holmes in the episode "The Final Problem" of the 1954 series The Adventures of Sherlock Holmes.
- Ralph Truman portrayed Moriarty in the 1955 BBC Home Service adaptation of "The Final Problem".
- In the BBC Radio 4 November 1992 broadcast of The Final Problem and 24 February 1993 broadcast of The Empty House, Moriarty was played by Michael Pennington.
- In the 1999 BBC radio comedy series The Newly Discovered Casebook of Sherlock Holmes, Moriarty was played by Geoffrey Whitehead.
- In the podcast Hollywood Handbook, Moriarty is played by Hayes Davenport where he is usually fighting the antihero Santaman, played by Sean Clements.
- In Audible's podcast, Moriarty, Dominic Monaghan essays the character of Moriarty, depicted here as an antihero.
- In the podcast Sherlock & Co., Moriarty appears as an overarching villain using only voice modulation recycled soundbites and hacking the podcast as voices. While the identity of the voice is currently unknown, he is only referred to as "James M.", "The Spider" or "Napoleon". He first "speaks" to the main cast in an adaption of The Six Napoleons.

== Film ==
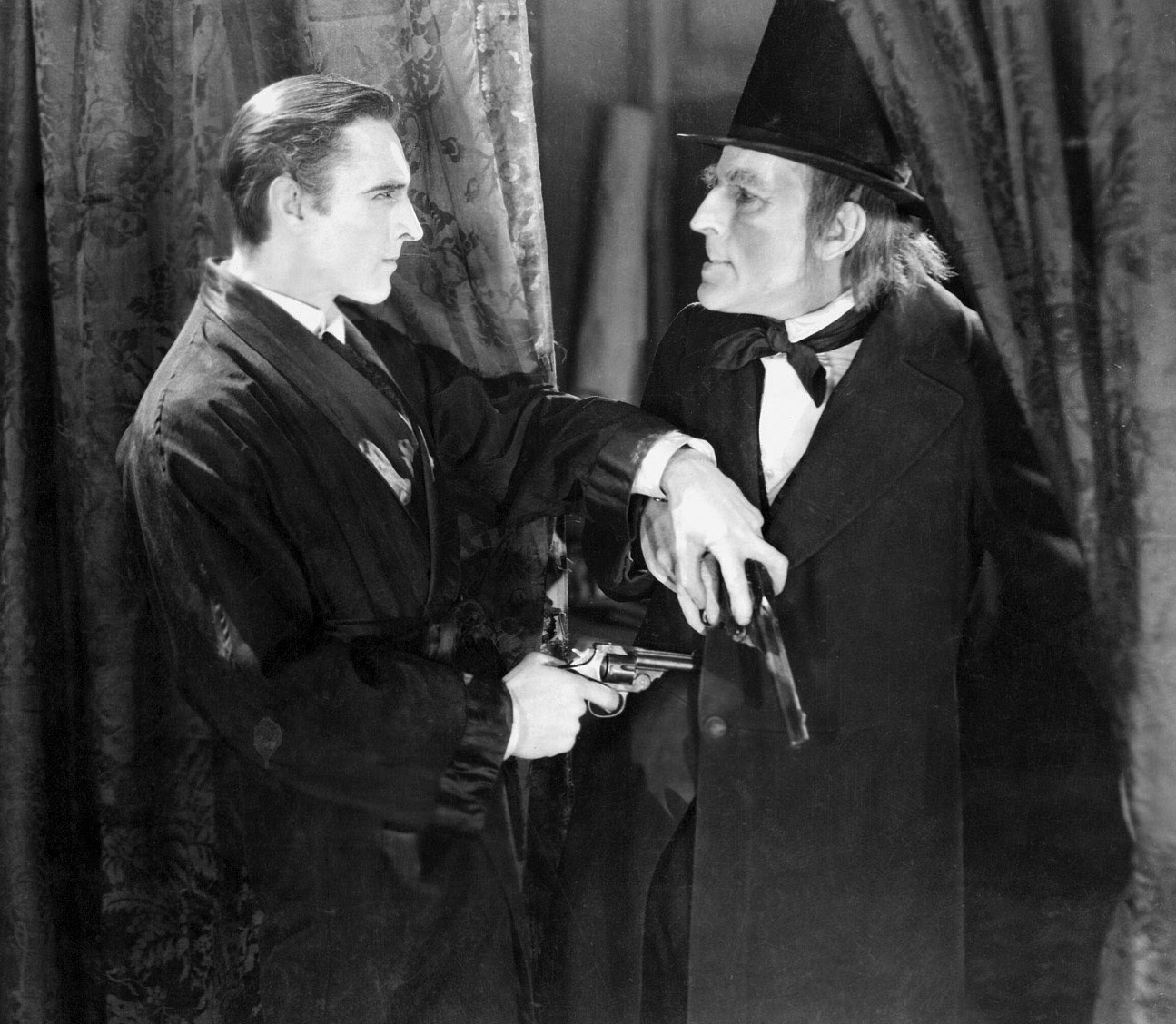
Gustav von Seyffertitz (right) as Moriarty in Sherlock Holmes (1922)

- Ernest Maupain portrayed Moriarty in Sherlock Holmes (1916).
- Gustav von Seyffertitz portrayed Moriarty in Sherlock Holmes (1922).
- Norman McKinnel portrayed Moriarty in The Sleeping Cardinal (1931).
- Ernest Torrence portrayed Moriarty in Sherlock Holmes (1932).
- Lyn Harding portrayed Moriarty in The Triumph of Sherlock Holmes (1935) and Silver Blaze (1937).
- George Zucco portrayed Moriarty in The Adventures of Sherlock Holmes (1939).
- Lionel Atwill portrayed Moriarty in Sherlock Holmes and the Secret Weapon (1942).
- Henry Daniell portrayed Moriarty in The Woman in Green (1945).
- Hans Söhnker portrayed Moriarty in Sherlock Holmes and the Deadly Necklace (1962).
- Leo McKern portrayed Moriarty in The Adventure of Sherlock Holmes' Smarter Brother (1975).
- Laurence Olivier portrayed Moriarty in The Seven-Per-Cent Solution (1976), based on the 1974 revisionist novel of the same name. In this version he is not the story's villain, but merely a harmless man who becomes a victim of Holmes' increasingly paranoid delusions, brought on by his addiction to cocaine and based on the fact that Moriarty indirectly contributed to the death of Holmes' mother, who was his lover.
- In Young Sherlock Holmes (1985), Anthony Higgins plays Holmes' schoolmaster, Rathe, who turns out to be an evil Egyptian mastermind called "Eh-Tar", who is presumed drowned after his last confrontation with the young Holmes and Watson. During the long credit roll at the end of the film, Eh-Tar (having survived his apparent death) is seen walking to an inn and signs the ledger as "Moriarty", indicating that he will become Holmes' archenemy in the future. Higgins later portrayed Holmes in Sherlock Holmes Returns (1993), making him one of only two actors to portray both Holmes and Moriarty on film (Richard Roxburgh being the other; Orson Welles played both Holmes and Moriarty in radio programmes).
- Vincent Price did the voice of Professor Ratigan, a character similar to Moriarty in The Great Mouse Detective (1986). He attempts an elaborate scheme to replace the mouse Queen with a clockwork robot that will appoint Ratigan her royal consort and give him full power over the empire, but Basil (the Holmes equivalent) exposes the deception, culminating in Ratigan falling from Big Ben during a final confrontation.
- Paul Freeman appeared as Moriarty in Without a Clue (1988); the film revolves around the premise that Dr. Watson (Ben Kingsley), who is the real crime-solving genius, has hired a boozy, out-of-work actor (Michael Caine) to play "Holmes". Moriarty is aware of the deception and refers to "Holmes" as "that imbecile", as opposed to Watson, whom he grudgingly respects. The case concludes with Moriarty being defeated in a duel with "Holmes" and forced to flee the old theatre where he had set up a printing press to produce forged currency using stolen printing plates.
- Anthony Andrews appeared as Moriarty in Hands of a Murderer (1990).
- In the anime film Case Closed: The Phantom of Baker Street (2002), Professor Moriarty tells Conan Edogawa that he trained Jack the Ripper when Jack was a street urchin.
- Vincent D'Onofrio appeared as Moriarty in the TV movie Sherlock: Case of Evil (2002).
- In The League of Extraordinary Gentlemen (2003), the film adaptation of the graphic novel by Alan Moore, Richard Roxburgh portrays the main antagonist named the Fantom, whose true identity was eventually revealed to be Professor James Moriarty in the climax. After a duel with Allan Quatermain (Sean Connery), he flees after delivering a fatal blow to the hunter, but is shot in the back by Tom Sawyer (Shane West) using Quatermain's rifle and shooting lessons.
- In the 2009 film, Sherlock Holmes, Moriarty appears as a shadowy, mysterious villain employing Irene Adler. The role was voiced by the film's dialect coach, Andrew Jack (although director Guy Ritchie refused to reveal his identity). Jared Harris played the role in the 2011 sequel, Sherlock Holmes: A Game of Shadows, as well as redubbing the character's lines from the first film in subsequent home releases and television broadcasts.
- Jamie Demetriou voiced a pie mascot version of Moriarty in the 2018 animated film Sherlock Gnomes.
- Ralph Fiennes portrayed Moriarty in the 2018 film Holmes & Watson, an otherwise comedic take on the Holmes and Watson characters.
- Sharon Duncan-Brewster portrayed a genderbent version of Moriarty in the 2022 film Enola Holmes 2. This version used the alias of Mira Troy (a flashback reveals that it is an anagram of her name) and posed as the secretary of Lord Charles McIntyre where they made use of corrupt police superintendent Grail and his fellow corrupt police officers in covering up their illegal activities.

== Television ==
- John Huston portrayed Moriarty in the made-for-TV movie Sherlock Holmes in New York (1976) opposite Roger Moore's Holmes, attempting to rob the international gold exchange in New York while threatening Irene Adler’s son to prevent Holmes from investigating. Holmes and Watson are able to rescue the son and solve the crime regardless, forcing Moriarty to flee after a last attempt to kidnap Irene's son after Holmes exposes the truth behind the crime and is able to arrange for the rest of Moriarty's American forces to be arrested.
- In the Soviet series of television films The Adventures of Sherlock Holmes and Dr. Watson (1979–1986) by Igor Maslennikov, Moriarty was played by Viktor Yevgrafov and voiced by Oleg Dahl in the second film of the series, also titled The Adventures of Sherlock Holmes and Dr. Watson (1980). The film is made of three episodes: "The King of Blackmail" (based on "The Adventure of Charles Augustus Milverton"), "Deadly Fight" (based on "The Final Problem") and "The Tiger Hunt" (based on "The Adventure of the Empty House").
- An anthropomorphic incarnation of Moriarty appeared in the anime series Sherlock Hound (1984–1985), voiced by Chikao Ōtsuka for Japanese and Hamilton Camp for English. During the series, Moriarty is the main antagonist behind every crime in almost each episode. As the characters were depicted as anthropomorphic dogs, Moriarty himself is seen closely resembling a wolf.
- Eric Porter portrayed Moriarty in three episodes of the TV series Sherlock Holmes (1984–1994), starring Jeremy Brett as Holmes: "The Red-Headed League" (1985) "The Final Problem" (1985) and "The Empty House" (1986). The three episodes in question are the last two of the first series, known as The Adventures of Sherlock Holmes, and the first one of the second series, known as The Return of Sherlock Holmes. Stock footage of Moriarty also appeared as a hallucination in the episode "The Devil's Foot" (1988), also from the second series. In the feature-length episode The Eligible Bachelor (1993), adapted from "The Adventure of the Noble Bachelor", Holmes describes Moriarty as "a giant of evil" and says, "I regret Moriarty's death [because] without him, I have to deal with distressed children, cat-owners—pygmies, pygmies of triviality. You see, Moriarty combined science with evil. Organization with precision. Vision with perception. I know of only one person that he misjudged. Me." The episode is part of the third series, known as The Case-Book of Sherlock Holmes.
- Moriarty appeared in two episodes of the animated series BraveStarr (1987–1988), voiced by Jonathan Harris.
- A holodeck simulation of Professor Moriarty, played by actor Daniel Davis, appeared in the Star Trek: The Next Generation (1987–1994) episodes "Elementary, Dear Data" (1988) and "Ship in a Bottle" (1993), accidentally achieving an artificial sentience when Geordi La Forge asks the holodeck to create an opponent able to defeat Data (rather than Sherlock Holmes). Moriarty also appears in the third season of Star Trek: Picard, once again played by Davis.
- "Elementary My Dear Winston", the third episode for the 1989 season of The Real Ghostbusters (1986–1992), features Holmes, Watson and Moriarty (voiced by Alan Shearman, Maurice LaMarche, and Rodger Bumpass, respectively) by way of "belief made manifest": so many people believed in them that they became real. Moriarty now has supernatural powers and employs the Hound of the Baskervilles as his henchman. Holmes and Moriarty are both sucked into the Ghostbusters' storage facility while wrestling, in the same manner as the conclusion of "The Final Problem".
- In the animated series Sherlock Holmes in the 22nd Century (1999–2001), Moriarty (voiced by Richard Newman) was the villain behind nearly all of the crimes. He had been cloned back to life by a rogue geneticist, requiring Holmes to be "resurrected" as well in order to match him. The body of the original Moriarty was still frozen in ice behind the waterfall that he fell from during his battle with Holmes.
- Moriarty appears as a holographic character in the Futurama (1999–2013) episode "Kif Gets Knocked Up a Notch" (2003), voiced by Maurice LaMarche. He comes out of the Holoshed of the Nimbus with Attila the Hun, Jack The Ripper, and Evil (Abraham) Lincoln.
- Jim Moriarty is played by actor Andrew Scott in the modern-day BBC adaptation, Sherlock (2010–2017), as a psychopathic "consulting criminal" who develops a murderous obsession with Holmes. He appears behind the scenes for most of the first two seasons, sponsoring a series of apparent suicides and then setting up a sequence of events where Holmes must solve key mysteries before people are blown up by timed bomb vests, culminating in a confrontation at a swimming pool that is cut short by an unexplained phone call that prompts Moriarty to depart to deal with other matters. In the Series 2 finale "The Reichenbach Fall" (2012), he briefly assumes the identity of Richard Brook ("Reicher Bach" in German), creating the illusion that Holmes is behind his crimes and paid him to assume the role of Moriarty. Through this he destroys Holmes' reputation and also threatens his friends in order to drive Holmes to suicide. He himself commits suicide in the climax of the episode, but, at the end of the later episode "His Last Vow" (2014), his face appears on TV screens across the country. Although Holmes spends most of the subsequent special ("The Abominable Bride", 2016) in an elaborate hallucination of a similar case in 1895 to try to determine how Moriarty might have survived, he eventually concludes that Moriarty is genuinely dead, but had planned in advance to have others carry out his plans after his own death. During "The Six Thatchers" (2017), Holmes states his confidence that Moriarty's plans will go into action at some future date, but makes it clear that he will currently act as normal as he is certain that Moriarty's trap will make itself obvious when the time is right. The episode “The Final Problem” reveals that, prior to his death, Moriarty had conspired with the true mastermind of the plot, Sherlock's sister Eurus.
- In the American television series Elementary (2012–2019), Moriarty (played by Natalie Dormer) is a composite character with Irene Adler. She is first mentioned in the 12th episode of the first season ("M", 2013). Holmes tracks an apparent serial killer who uses the name "M"; upon his capture, he is discovered to be Sebastian Moran, Moriarty's henchman, whose seemingly random murders were actually assassinations carried out for his employer, whom he claims to have never met. In the season finale, "Irene Adler" is revealed to be an alias created by Moriarty in order to get close to Holmes and observe him (the male voice who spoke to Holmes as "Moriarty" over the telephone is revealed to be one of her lieutenants). The episode "We Are Everyone" (2013) reveals her true name as Jamie Moriarty and she continues to write letters to Holmes from prison. She briefly escapes prison to assist in an investigation of a kidnapping of a girl who is revealed to be her daughter, abducted by the man who acted as Moriarty in past conversations, but willingly returns to custody after her daughter is safe. Despite being in prison, she later arranges for a ruthless crime boss to be assassinated after the woman attempts to kill Holmes’ partner Joan Watson, sending her a letter to confirm her involvement. In the last episodes of season four, Holmes and Watson meet Professor Joshua Vikner (portrayed by Tony Curran), the father of Moriarty's child, who has taken over her organization after her incarceration, and who is also based on the literary version of Moriarty. He is killed thanks to the actions of Sherlock's father Morland, who takes over the Moriarty's organization in order to dismantle it from within and ensure that none of its assets can be used against his son. By the time of the final episode of the series, Morland is dead, Moriarty's organisation basically disbanded, and Moriarty herself is presumed by the government to be dead, although Holmes expresses doubts about this even after attending her funeral.
- In the Russian-produced Sherlock Holmes (2013) series by Andrey Kavun, Moriarty was played by actor Alexey Gorbunov. Moriarty is a mathematics professor who attempts to assassinate the Queen. He appeared as the head of a London-wide criminal network called "The Cabmen Gang".
- In the NHK puppetry Sherlock Holmes (2014–present), Moriarty is the tall and blond deputy headmaster of Beeton School where Holmes and Watson study and live, and has a face with two different aspects: one of which looks calm but the other looks severe. Though he always behaves gentlemanly, he is strict with pupils, especially Holmes, who behaves at his own pace. He usually calls a pupil by his/her given name and surname; for example, he calls Watson "John Hamish Watson". He is voiced by Masashi Ebara.
- Moriarty is a recurring character in season 2 of The Librarians (2014–2018), where is he is played by David S. Lee. Here, Moriarty has been brought to life by Prospero of William Shakespeare’s The Tempest, and is forced to serve as his strategist. Though he maintains his loyalty to Prospero throughout the season, he eventually betrays him in the final episode, only to be banished back to his story as punishment. At the last second, he reveals that the only way to beat Prospero is to destroy his staff.
- James Moriarty is a recurring character in Case File nº221: Kabukicho. He is voiced by: Seiichirō Yamashita (Japanese); Justin Briner (English).
- In HBO Asia/Hulu's re-imagining Miss Sherlock, Moriarty is first mentioned in episode six under the name Akira Moriwaki, and is believed to be behind the events of most of the series. Episode seven reveals Moriwaki to be Wato's (the Watson analogue) middle-aged female psychiatrist, Dr. Mariko Irikawa (as played by Yuki Saito.
- Moriarty is the protagonist of the anime series Moriarty the Patriot, which was adapted from the manga series of the same name. He is voiced by Soma Saito, and by Aaron Dismuke for the English dub.
- The CBS series Watson features Moriarty (played by Randall Park) as a recurring character. This Moriarty was seemingly born with the middle and ring fingers on his hands fused together, with his hands thus creating the impression of an "M", but this is later revealed to be a fake defect he used to focus his enemies' attention on an irrelevant detail. He is assumed to have been killed in the Reichenbach Falls along with Holmes, but he is swiftly revealed to be alive, blackmailing Watson's friend Shinwell Johnston into helping Moriarty gain access to Watson's genetic research and switch the medication Watson is taking for a traumatic brain injury for pills that cause hallucinations. Moriarty also blackmails Ingrid Derian, one of Watson's research fellows, regarding the knowledge of how she murdered her father (albeit in defence of her sister) to help him access Watson's research. Moriarty's plan is revealed in the season finale when he uses Watson's research to release a dangerous virus, intending to refine it to eliminate whole families or even specific groups, but Ingrid is able to infect Moriarty with a sample of this virus. Watson then forces Moriarty to return the stolen samples so that he can develop a cure for the virus infecting his team in exchange for curing Moriarty, but Watson ultimately chooses to withhold the full cure and let Moriarty die as he concludes that Moriarty is too dangerous to remain alive, even if it clearly troubles him that he killed a man at the end.
- In the Amazon Prime Video series Young Sherlock (2026), a younger version of James Moriarty is portrayed by actor Dónal Finn. In the series, Moriarty meets Sherlock while studying at the University of Oxford.

== Literature ==
- In David McDaniel's 1965 novel, The Dagger Affair (The Man From U.N.C.L.E. No. 4), THRUSH satrap Ward Baldwin explains to the U.N.C.L.E. team working with him to save the world that THRUSH is the successor to Moriarty's 19th Century criminal organization.
- In Nicholas Meyer's 1974 revisionist novel, The Seven-Per-Cent Solution, Moriarty is portrayed as Holmes' childhood mathematics tutor, a whining little man with a guilty secret. He is incensed to hear that Holmes, apparently under the influence of cocaine, has depicted him as a criminal mastermind. Due to Holmes' worsening condition, Moriarty threatens to tell the authorities about Holmes' addiction. Dr. Watson seeks the help of Sigmund Freud, who uncovers the truth behind Holmes' perception of "the Napoleon of Crime". This is one of many works to seize on the fact that Moriarty never actually shows his face in the Holmes canon. The novel was made into a 1976 film and starred Laurence Olivier as a very different sort of Professor Moriarty.
- John Gardner has written three novels featuring the arch-villain: The Return of Moriarty (1974), in which the Professor, like Holmes, is shown to have survived the meeting at the Reichenbach, The Revenge of Moriarty (1975) and Moriarty (released posthumously in 2008 after the author's death in 2007). In these novels, Moriarty is depicted as a Victorian-era Al Capone or Don Corleone, who single-handedly controls London's organised crime structure. "The Professor" is not really Moriarty, but Moriarty's younger brother, also named James, and as brilliant as his older brother, whom he impersonates, disgraces and murders, later stealing the deceased's identity.
- Kim Newman used Moriarty as a minor character in the first volume of his Anno Dracula (1992) series; he claims to have given up his criminal interests, in the face of Count Dracula's increasing domination of London, and become a vampire in order to have infinite time to pursue his mathematical researches. Newman later wrote a series of short stories about Moriarty, narrated Watson-style by Colonel Moran, in which Moriarty interacts with many of his fictional contemporaries. They have been collected in Moriarty: The Hound of the D'Urbervilles (2011). One of the stories, "The Red Planet League", first appeared in Gaslight Grimoire. Another story, "The Adventure of the Greek Invertebrate" (a play on "The Adventure of the Greek Interpreter", which introduced Sherlock Holmes' brother Mycroft), features Professor Moriarty's two brothers, also named James, the colonel and the station master, and offers an explanation for the lack of variety in their forenames. The last story, "The Problem of the Final Adventure", is a revisionist retelling of "The Adventure of the Final Problem" from the other side.
- Moriarty appears in a short story by Donald Serrell Thomas, in his collection The Secret Cases of Sherlock Holmes (1997), as the mastermind of a blackmail plot involving the alleged bigamy of Prince George. His younger brother, Col. James Moriarty, appears as the antagonist of another short story in Thomas' The Execution of Sherlock Holmes (2007).
- The Titanic Tragedy by William Seil features Homes and Watson sailing on the RMS Titanic on its maiden voyage to supervise secret plans being taken to America, and realise that one of the other passengers is Colonel James Moriarty, the professor's brother. Holmes explicitly notes that both Moriarty brothers were named "James" by their parents, reflecting that this lack of originality in the matter of names demonstrates the limited intellectual abilities of both parents and he was never sure how the professor turned out so brilliant. Colonel Moriarty turns out to be after the plans himself, with Holmes reflecting that he has the potential to be just as dangerous as his brother, but he dies in a confrontation with Holmes on the night of the sinking and Holmes manages to escape.
- Michael Kurland has written a series of five novels (The Infernal Device, Death by Gaslight, The Great Game, The Empress of India, and Who Thinks Evil) and four short stories featuring Moriarty.
- Moriarty appears in Alan Moore's comic book series The League of Extraordinary Gentlemen (1999–present). Recruited from university by British Intelligence, he supposedly set up his criminal empire as part of an undercover operation to monitor crime in London which got out of hand, to the point where the 'cover' became more real to Moriarty than his role in British Intelligence. Having survived the encounter with Holmes, he went on to become head of British Intelligence under the code-name "M" but still maintained his criminal interests. He instigated the creation of the League as a covert ops unit with plausible deniability and used them to recover an anti-gravity mineral called Cavorite which had been stolen by his crime lord rival the Doctor. He used the Cavorite to bomb the East End of London in an attempt to destroy the Doctor but was thwarted by the League which had uncovered the double-cross. Following his supposed death (indicated, but not clearly portrayed, as he "falls" into the sky while clutching the Cavorite), he was ironically succeeded as "M" by Mycroft Holmes, Sherlock's older brother. In The League of Extraordinary Gentlemen: Black Dossier, it is suggested that Jack Kerouac's Dean Moriarty (from On the Road) is his great-grandson, and the rivalry between the two criminals is continued by the fact that the Doctor's great-grandson is Kerouac's other creation, Doctor Sax. In the third volume, set more than six decades later, Mina Murray comes across his carcass, still holding on to the Cavorite, inside a block of ice floating through space.
- In The Mandala of Sherlock Holmes (1999), set during Holmes' three-year fake "death", Holmes encounters Moriarty during his trip in Tibet, where he learns that Moriarty is actually "the Dark One", a former Tibetan mystic possessing great psychic powers who lost his memories in an attack on the Dalai Lama, only for his near-death experience on the Reichenbach Falls to restore his memory, albeit leaving him horribly crippled and disfigured by his injuries. He attempts to acquire a legendary crystal that would allow him to wield even greater power, but, although Moriarty acquires the crystal, boosting his powers and healing his injuries, he is defeated when it is revealed that Holmes is partly possessed by the spirit of the Dark One's old rival. Sharing the spirit of a former llama allows Holmes to wield similar powers to Moriarty's, utilizing these mental powers to delay his old enemy long enough for Holmes' ally, Huree Chunder Mockerjee, to knock the crystal away from Moriarty and into Holmes' hands, giving Holmes the power to turn Moriarty's own abilities against him, vaporising Moriarty's body and destroying him once and for all.
- In Neil Gaiman's short story "A Study in Emerald" (2003), the Moriarty and Holmes of an alternate history reverse roles. Moriarty (who, although never named as such in the story, is identified as the author of Dynamics of an Asteroid) is hired to investigate a murder. The murder has apparently been carried out by Sherlock Holmes (who signs his name Rache, an allusion to Doyle's first novel starring Holmes and Watson, A Study in Scarlet, in which "Rache"—German for "revenge"—is found written above the body of a murder victim) and Dr. Watson. The story is narrated by Colonel Sebastian Moran, given the rank of Major (Ret.) by Gaiman.
- In a 2006 comic book story featuring Lee Falk's The Phantom, the 19th Phantom has to fight Moriarty; the climax of the story features the Phantom and Moriarty falling down a waterfall in the Bangalla jungle. At the end of the story, Moriarty is shown to be alive, as he returns to London to find "a detective named Sherlock Holmes".
- In the comic series Victorian Undead (2010), Holmes and Watson must face a 'reborn' Moriarty as he unleashes a zombie plague on London, having survived his own death via a modified zombie formula that allows Moriarty to retain his intellect despite his deathly state.
- In Paco Ignacio Taibo II's "The Return of the Tigers of Malaysia" (2010), Dr James Moriarty appears as the mastermind behind the attacks on Sandokan and his friend Yanez.
- In Anthony Horowitz' 2011 novel The House of Silk, a chapter is dedicated to Watson's meeting with a secretive criminal mastermind. This character is not definitively identified, however it is heavily implied that he is Moriarty. Watson later states that he believes this to be the case, and in an appendix Horowitz states the identity of the character outright. Moriarty also appears as a corpse in Moriarty, the 2014 sequel to this novel, in which Pinkerton detective Frederick Chase is investigating the events that took place at the Reichenbach Falls.
- In The Thinking Engine (2015) by James Lovegrove, set in 1895—specifically at the same time as the events of "The Adventure of the Three Students"—Holmes is called to challenge the Thinking Engine, an early computer that is seemingly capable of solving crimes using the same deductive abilities as Holmes himself. As the novel unfolds, Holmes realizes that every case the Engine has been called on to solve was committed by a perpetrator who had to be assisted by someone else to come up with such an intellectual scheme. In the final confrontation, Holmes and his allies realize that the Thinking Engine is actually a hollow construct with Moriarty inside it; he survived the confrontation at the Reichenbach Falls as he was wearing a specially designed body armour that protected his vital organs, although his limbs were so injured that his legs and one arm have been amputated and he can still barely speak on his own due to damage to his larynx. With his deception exposed, Moriarty apparently dies due to complications of the drugs being used to medicate his injuries, although it is strongly implied that Holmes gave him a deliberate overdose to prevent the risk of a trial allowing Moriarty to escape again.
- In Sherlock Holmes and the Servants of Hell (2016) by Paul Kane, it is revealed that Moriarty was able to escape his demise by using an incantation to transfer himself into the realm of the Cenobites, where he is transformed into the 'Engineer' of the Cenobites, intending to mount a new assault on Earth. Holmes is able to make a deal with the master Cenobites to transform himself into a Cenobite to oppose Moriarty's forces, the final confrontation seeing Moriarty destroyed once again, while Watson is able to make his own deal to restore Holmes to normal.
- The Martian Menace by Eric Brown (2020) is essentially a sequel to The War of the Worlds, looking at Holmes having come out of retirement after the Martian invasion was thwarted and diplomatic relations were established with the red planet. After Holmes is invited to Mars to investigate the death of a Martian philosopher, he and Watson learn that the Martians are not only attempting a second invasion using remote-controlled humanoid robots, but they were aided in their initial invasion by Moriarty, having rescued Moriarty from death and using his criminal expertise. However, the Martians betrayed Moriarty by trapping him in a complex device that kept him on the brink of death while forced to continue advising them, prompting Moriarty to subtly work to undermine their second invasion attempt by discreetly setting up a resistance movement against the Martians and even drawing Holmes into the scheme. A final confrontation between the two ends with Holmes turning off Moriarty's life support systems on the request of his old adversary, Holmes later informing the Martian leaders that they were defeated precisely because they abused Moriarty when if they had agreed with the initial terms he would have continued to serve as their ally.
- Sherlock Holmes and the Beast of the Stapeltons by James Lovegrove (2020) is essentially a sequel to The Hound of the Baskervilles, where Holmes and Watson learn that their old ally, Doctor James Mortimer, is actually Moriarty's step-brother; his mother married Moriarty's father, and Doctor Mortimer was the one who wrote the letters defending his brother's memory under the alias of station-master Colonel Moriarty.
- In The Cthulhu Casebooks by James Lovegrove, presenting an alternate version of Holmes' cases where he and Watson regularly faced the Great Old Ones of H. P. Lovecraft's work, Moriarty is the antagonist of the first novel, Sherlock Holmes and the Shadwell Shadows (2016), set in 1881, where he attempts various sacrifices to win the aid of the old god Nyarlathotep, but is drawn in by his would-be god when he attempts to sacrifice Holmes, Watson, Mycroft and Gregson, although Holmes speculates that he has some plan to return.
  - In the sequel, Sherlock Holmes and the Miskatonic Monstrosities (2017), Holmes and Watson learn in 1896 that Moriarty's willing sacrifice of himself to Nyarlathotep gave him the strength of will to consume his would-be god's power for himself, leading some of the other Outer Gods against the Old Ones in preparation for an assault on Earth due to his greater ambition and drive. Holmes and Watson are able to defeat Moriarty's current assault by destroying his human agent, but they are each aware that Moriarty will return.
  - In the conclusion of the trilogy, Sherlock Holmes and the Sussex Sea-Devils, set in 1910, after killing Mycroft Holmes and various other old allies of Sherlock with his mortal agents, Moriarty captures Holmes and Watson with the intention of taking them to witness his destruction of Cthulhu's physical form as his Outer God forces destroy Cthulhu's mind on the higher planes, which he believes will allow him to kill Cthulhu and ensure his own dominance. However, Holmes had secretly made a deal with Cthulhu years ago to maintain his own vitality while hunting Cthulhu's enemies on this plane, and when Holmes grants permission for Cthulhu to take back what was given, it gives Cthulhu such a power boost that he recovers from the injuries inflicted by Moriarty's efforts, with the two last shown engaging in a physical struggle as they ascend into the higher planes.
- In the manga series Moriarty the Patriot written by Ryōsuke Takeuchi and illustrated by Hikaru Miyoshi, the story follows a young Moriarty and his two brothers, expanding on their motives for following a path of crime.
- In New Paradigm Studios comic series Holmes and Watson (set in modern day Harlem with the characters being African-Americans), Moriarty is a "software giant/record label/movie studio/clothing brand" alluded to throughout the comic. In "Music. A Treat For the Gods, Doctor...", a modernization of "A Scandal in Bohemia," William King of Bohemia Record Labels attempts to sell Irene Adlero's song to the Moriarty label.
- In the Chinese novel series Lord of Mysteries, written by Cuttlefish That Loves Diving, the main protagonist Klein Moretti took on the alias of "Sherlock Moriarty", a portmanteau of both Sherlock Holmes and Moriarty, towards the end of the first volume. In the television adaptation of the same name, it occurred during the season one finale.
- In Gareth Rubin's novel Holmes & Moriarty (2024), Holmes and Watson are forced to join forces with Moriarty and Colonel Moran after taking up a case linked to a murder for which the professor is framed.
- In The Return of Moriarty (2025) by Jack Anderson, Moriarty has survived the fight at Reichenbach, with Holmes having seemingly perished. Taking on the identity of inventor Hugo Strahm, he journeys to a dilapidated manor house in Bavaria, where he meets the chaotic Aber family. When one of them is poisoned, Moriarty attempts to solve the crime while keeping his identity secret from his new acquaintance, medical student Clara Mendel.
- The Professor & Mrs. Moriarty Mysteries by Anna Castle sees a more heroic version of Moriarty as he is drawn into cases alongside his mysterious American wife Angelina Gould.
- In The Moriarty Murders (2026) by Jack Gatland, investigative journalist Abigail Wren discovers she is the last surviving descendent of Moriarty, and inherits what remains of his criminal empire. When one of the gang turns up dead, Abigail puts her new subordinates to use to find his killer, whilst trying to unearth usurpers to her position.

== Video games ==
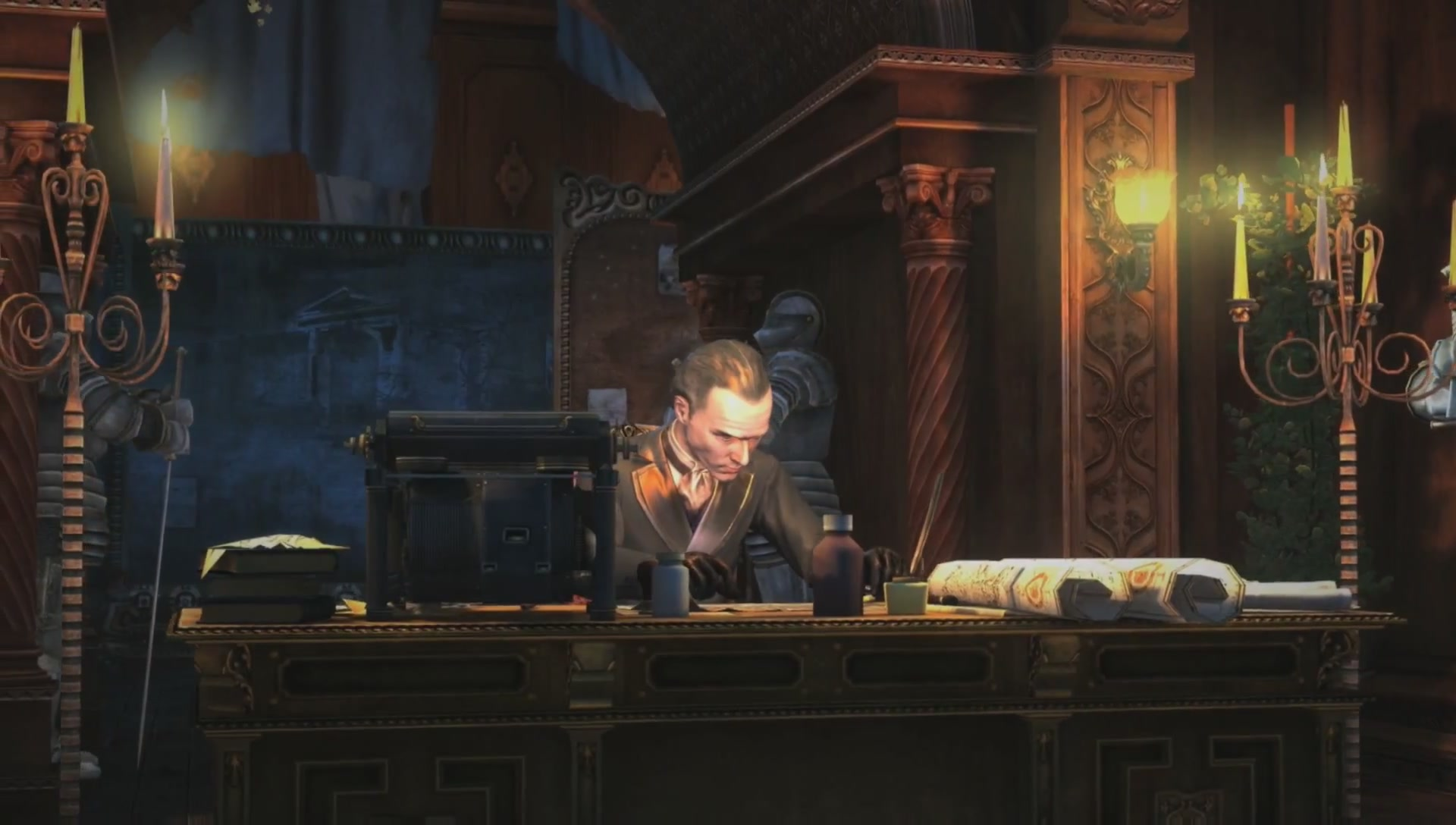
Moriarty in The Testament of Sherlock Holmes (2012)

- In the computer adventure Sherlock Holmes: The Awakened (2007), Holmes encounters Moriarty locked in a Switzerland mental hospital in 1895 (four years after "The Final Problem"), where the Professor has suffered severe brain injuries from the Falls. Not recognising Holmes in disguise, Moriarty is tricked into thinking his nemesis is in the hospital lobby, and charges from his cell in a frenzy, giving Holmes a diversion so he may investigate the asylum's secrets further.
- In the massive-multiplayer role-playing online game Wizard101 (2008) there is a character based on Moriarty, named "Meowiarty".
- In Sherlock Holmes Versus Arsène Lupin, or Sherlock Holmes: Nemesis, there has been no word of any mental recovery or escape attempts by Moriarty. Holmes remarks to Watson, "If there had, we would be on the way to Switzerland already."
- Moriarty returns in The Testament of Sherlock Holmes (2012), as the main antagonist who tries to frame Holmes and create anarchy in response for being tricked by Holmes in the Black Edelweiss Institute in Switzerland.
- In Sherlock Holmes: The Devil's Daughter (2016), Moriarty's death continues to haunt Holmes due to the fact that Sherlock adopted Moriarty's daughter Katelyn and is living in fear of her discovering the truth about her biological father and following in his footsteps. After Kate is kidnapped Holmes discovers Moriarty's crypt and a message he left for Kate where it's revealed Moriarty anticipated both his death and Kate's adoption, he attempts to convince her to turn against Holmes and continue his work.
- In the mobile game Fate/Grand Order (2015), Moriarty is an Archer class Servant and the antagonist of the Shinjuku chapter. His alias is Archer of Shinjuku.
- In the 2020 mobile video game "Sherlock: Hidden Match-3 Cases," developed by G5 Entertainment, Professor Moriarty appears as a key antagonist.

== See also ==
- List of actors who have played Professor Moriarty
