= Constellations (2005 book) =

2005 short story anthology

- First edition
- Author: Edited by Peter Crowther
- Language: English
- Series: Peter Crowther DAW anthologies
- Genre: Science fiction anthology
- Publisher: DAW Books
- Publication date: 2005
- Publication place: United States
- Media type: Print (paperback)
- Pages: 310
- Preceded by: Mars Probes
- Followed by: Forbidden Planets

Constellations (2005) is a science fiction anthology of all-new short stories edited by British writer and journalist Peter Crowther, the fourth in his themed science fiction anthology series for DAW Books. The stories are all intended to be inspired by the theme of constellations. The book was published in 2005. The title page carries a subtitle, "The Best of New British SF".

The book includes a three-page introduction by Crowther entitled, "Britain Swings!", fifteen short stories, and a six-page set of author biographies at the end.

The stories are as follows:

- Eric Brown: "A Heritage of Stars"
- Paul McAuley: "Rats of the System"
- Brian W. Aldiss: "Ten Billion Of Them"
- Tony Ballantyne: "Star!"
- Stephen Baxter: "Lakes of Light"
- Roger Levy: "No Cure For Love"
- Ian Watson: "The Navigator's Children"
- Keith Brooke: "A Different Sky"
- Gwyneth Jones: "The Fulcrum"
- James Lovegrove: "The Meteor Party"
- Ian McDonald: "Written In the Stars"
- Adam Roberts: "The Order of Things"
- Justina Robson: "The Little Bear"
- Colin Greenland: "Kings"
- Alastair Reynolds: "Beyond the Aquila Rift"
