= Castles Made of Sand (novel) =

2002 novel by Gwyneth Jones

- Cover of Gollancz first edition
- Author: Gwyneth Jones
- Language: English
- Series: Bold As Love Sequence
- Genre: Science fiction
- Publisher: Gollancz
- Publication date: 2002
- Publication place: United Kingdom
- Media type: Print (Hardcover & Paperback)
- ISBN: 0-575-07032-3
- OCLC: 155570141
- Dewey Decimal: 823/.914 22
- LC Class: PR6060.O5163 C37 2002
- Preceded by: Bold As Love
- Followed by: Midnight Lamp

Castles Made of Sand, first published in 2002, is a science fiction novel by British writer Gwyneth Jones. It is the second of a series of five books written by and set in a near-future version of the United Kingdom. It was nominated for the 2002 BSFA Award.

== Plot summary ==
Halfway through Bold as Love the two male leads agree that one day they will take oxytocin together — the intimacy drug, based on the hormone released to create the bond between mother and baby, or between monogamous reproductive partners. At the opening of the second episode we meet Ax and Sage loved-up, making out on Brighton Beach on an oxytocin high: a shocking development for readers lulled by the sexual conformity of the first volume. Ensuing chapters are devoted to the painful birth-pangs of a passionate rock and roll sexual threesome.

Meanwhile, Ax's friends, the other almost-famous Indie musicians who survived Massacre Night, are repelled by vapid celebrity-culture, and form an alliance instead with the security forces, the emergency services, and the masses: the beleaguered people of England. This "innocent" feudalism is counterpointed by far more sinister developments on the Green Right Wing, where a Pan-European Celtic movement grows in the shadows, like National Socialism, into something monstrous. The love affair between Ax, Sage and Fiorinda is treated with wit and tenderness, and Jones's trademark emotional intensity, yet it clearly serves as a microcosm for the macrocosm of Ax's England: and a test bed for one of the most naïve (or daring) assertions of radical politics. Is love really all we need? Can utter personal freedom and licence, restrained only by that oxytocin bond, form the foundation of the Good State...?

As in Bold As Love on Massacre Night there is a revelatory gestalt flip, here mediated by the Irishman, Fergal Kearney, (shades of Shane MacGowan) one of Jones's fascinating and engaging secondary characters: a bridge after which everything developed in the first chapters takes on a different meaning. Readers are wrest from the canonisation of Thom Yorke and Led Zeppelin, and the highly plausible trials of a country wrecked by global warming and social unrest, into the darkest of adult fairytales. It seems that Jones, unable to contain the problem of evil realistically in the pantomime format of Bold As Love, (her own description) has chosen to depict the horrors, that must attend a future such as she describes, in terms of the supernatural. Parted by the manipulation of a truly horrible, thoroughly enjoyable pantomime villain, each member of the Triumvirate suffers the trials and tests of fairytale, updated for the 21st Century: Ax, far away, as the hostage of a vicious drug cartel, Sage in his struggle to achieve the Holy Grail of Bold As Love fantasy neuroscience; and Fiorinda as a different and uglier kind of hostage, laying down her life for her people. A rich fusion of legend and folklore, science and fantasy, ancient and modern, brings the story to a climax. By the time Aoxomoxoa sets sail for the castle of the Wounded King, in a futuristic yacht called the Lorien, with a mainframe computer in the jewel of a ring borrowed from the female Merlin, the re-imagining, re-vision of the Arthur cycle seems triumphantly complete.

Jimi Hendrix was a great fan of science fiction, though probably not as steeped in sf as Gwyneth Jones has proved to be in rock and roll. His lyrics and his music permeate Castles Made Of Sand, but here the ruin of treasured dreams (...and so castles made of sand, fall in the sea...) is not the end of the story; and the violent romanticism of Led Zeppelin is not the last phase of this rock and roll career. There is more of Jones's "complicated optimism" to come. Few readers can have anticipated a sequel so different from Bold As Love, yet essentially the formula is the same: a Brechtian pantomime, neither fantasy, nor sf, nor mainstream, that manages to be both deadly serious, and thoroughly entertaining.

== Inspiration ==
The titles of all the novels in the Bold as Love Sequence are taken from songs by or works related to Jimi Hendrix. Castles Made of Sand is named for the song 'Castles Made of Sand' on Hendrix's second studio album, Axis: Bold As Love. The name of the ship that set sail for the Castle of the Wounded King; Aoxomoxoa, is taken from The Grateful Dead's album of the same name. released in 1969.

== See also ==
- Bold as Love website
- Infinity Plus review
