= We Think, Therefore We Are =

2009 book edited by Crowther

- First edition
- Editor: Peter Crowther
- Language: English
- Series: Peter Crowther DAW anthologies
- Genre: Science fiction
- Publisher: DAW Books
- Publication date: 2009
- Publication place: United States
- Media type: Print (paperback)
- Pages: 320 pp
- Preceded by: Forbidden Planets

We Think, Therefore We Are (2009) is a science fiction anthology of new short stories edited by Peter Crowther, the sixth in his themed science fiction anthology series for DAW Books. The main topic of the fifteen stories in the book is artificial intelligence. The introduction is written by Paul McAuley.

The stories are as follows:

- Stephen Baxter: "Tempest 43"
- Brian Stableford: "The Highway Code"
- Eric Brown: "Salvage Rites"
- James Lovegrove: "The Kamikaze Code"
- Adam Roberts: "Adam Robots"
- Tony Ballantyne: "Seeds"
- Steven Utley: "Lost Places of the Earth"
- Marly Youmans: "The Chinese Room"
- Robert Reed: "Three Princesses"
- Paul Di Filippo: "The New Cyberiad"
- Patrick O'Leary: "That Laugh"
- Garry Kilworth: "Alles in Ordnung"
- Keith Brooke: "Sweats"
- Ian Watson: "Some Fast Thinking Needed"
- Chris Roberson: "Dragon King of the Eastern Sea"
