= Midnight Lamp =

2003 novel by Gwyneth Jones

- Cover of Gollancz first edition
- Author: Gwyneth Jones
- Language: English
- Series: Bold As Love Sequence
- Genre: Science fiction
- Publisher: Gollancz
- Publication date: 2003
- Publication place: United Kingdom
- Media type: Print (Hardcover & Paperback)
- ISBN: 0-575-07470-1
- OCLC: 52948046
- Preceded by: Castles Made of Sand
- Followed by: Band of Gypsys

Midnight Lamp, first published in 2003, is a science fiction novel by British writer Gwyneth Jones. It is the third of a series of five books set in a near-future version of the United Kingdom. It was nominated for both the 2003 BSFA, and the 2004 Arthur C. Clarke Awards.

== Plot summary ==
The third episode of the Bold As Love Sequence opens on a cold beach in Mexico, where Ax and Sage are hesitantly renegotiating their relationship, while Fiorinda struggles on the brink of schizophrenic fugue. The rockstars, scarred by outrageous fortune, have dropped out, joined the masses, abandoned the centre stage: hoping to find peace. Their Avalon is invaded by Harry Lopez, the boy-wonder producer who wants to make a virtual movie about Ax Preston; who brings a summons from the US President. The secret behind the assassination of Rufus O’Niall is out. The Pentagon is openly embarked on developing the new human superweapon: but President Fred Eiffrich, who wants to stop the Neurobomb, believes the hawks are speeding the process by shocking, and extremely dangerous, means. He needs advice. With indecent haste the three decide that what they really need is the hair of the dog that bit them. Soon they are heading north to tackle the demons of the Republic of California, in an adventure where the West Coast music scene will be ignored, while Hollywood — the virtual movies, the stars, the agents, the players — takes the role that rock and roll played in England.

In Midnight Lamp, the Bold As Love glamour is deconstructed by confrontation with the real world. A young woman raped by her father, and doomed by the crippling mental illness that is her heritage, featuring on the reality TV show hosted by Bollywood import, the truly wonderful Puusi Meera . A pop-icon warlord, latest darling of the Hollywood fame machine, admits to dirty secrets behind the romance of the Rock and Roll Reich. A reformed bad boy, stripped of his wealth, status and physical prowess, finds that enlightenment is no protection from remorse. Secondary characters come to the fore, loyalties are strained. The Few — shipped over from a dreary post-Ax England — are thinking of solo projects. As the Pentagon thriller unfolds, against the backdrop of an uncannily believable day-after-tomorrow tinseltown, Gwyneth Jones returns to her long-time fascination with boundary events, moments of change. The "magic" of the Bold As Love Sequence is conjured into science fictional reality (literally conjured, on stage at the Hollywood Bowl!) through the mediation of historical precedents: the sheer, limitless terror of the atom bomb when it was new; and the transition from alchemy into chemistry, myth into manufacture, in the midst of the French Revolution. And above all, there is the desert: Vireo Lake, Lavoisier, the "Cow Castle"—lyrical images of austerity and endurance, of human/nature, flayed to the point of death but undefeated.

This is the lightest in tone of the Bold As Love books, despite some inventively gory crime scenes. Dissolution has gone global, there is no escape, but by the final credits the heroes have made their peace with the Burning World, the maelstrom in which they will live and die. Yet there is a darker undertow, an elegy for those who have no hope: for the Invisible People, fragments of human souls, digital fodder for virtual movies; for the self-immolation of the Gaian martyrs; and for the unsung queen of it all, Janelle Firdous. The addictions of fame, the addictions of power, are inescapable: but most dangerous, perhaps, those who have been cheated of the glittering prizes.

== Inspiration ==
The titles of all the novels in the Bold as Love Sequence are taken from songs by or works related to Jimi Hendrix. Midnight Lamp is named for the song "Burning of the Midnight Lamp" on Hendrix's third studio album, Electric Ladyland.

== See also ==
- Bold as Love website
- Infinity Plus review
- Guardian newspaper review
- Midnight Lamp at Worlds Without End
