= Bold as Love (novel) =

2001 novel by Gwyneth Jones

Bold As Love
- Cover of Gollancz first edition
- Author: Gwyneth Jones
- Language: English
- Series: Bold As Love Sequence
- Genre: Science fiction
- Publisher: Gollancz
- Publication date: 2001
- Publication place: United Kingdom
- Media type: Print (Hardcover & Paperback)
- ISBN: 0-575-07030-7
- OCLC: 46847734
- Dewey Decimal: 823/.914 21
- LC Class: PR6060.O5163 B65 2001
- Followed by: Castles Made of Sand

Bold As Love, first published in 2001, is a science fiction novel by British writer Gwyneth Jones. It is the first of a series of five books written by Gwyneth Jones and set in a near-future version of the United Kingdom. The full title of the novel is Bold as Love: a Near Future Fantasy. It combines elements of science fiction, fantasy and horror and contains themes of gender, politics, and environmental change.

== Plot summary ==
Ax Preston, a mixed-race guitarist from Taunton, having survived a government organized massacre of the official Green Party (under cover of a pop-culture reception), emerges as the true leader England desperately needs. He and his friends, also indie musicians, tackle a series of disasters, including a minor war with Islamic Separatists in Yorkshire, and a hippie President who turns out to be a murdering pedophile. In the background the whole of Europe is falling apart, in the foreground there are rock festivals, street-fighting, a rampage of "Green" destruction (led and moderated by Preston) leaving a trail of burned-out hypermarkets, wrecked fast food outlets, and vast expanses of napalmed intensive farming. Preston succeeds in supporting his country through the crisis, utilizing his guile, self-sacrifice, goodwill, and the power of the music. In England, the revolution never descends into a terror.

== Background and Publication ==
The titles of all the novels in the Bold as Love Sequence are taken from songs by or works related to Jimi Hendrix. Bold As Love is named for Hendrix's second studio album, Axis: Bold As Love.

== Reception ==
Bold as Love won the Arthur C Clarke Award in 2002 and was shortlisted for the 2001 BSFA Award and the 2002 British Fantasy Award for Best Novel (August Derleth Award).

== See also ==
- Bold as Love website
- SFsite review
- Infinity Plus review
- Independent Online review
- Bold as Love at Worlds Without End
