= Mars Probes =

2002 anthology edited by Peter Crowther

- First edition
- Author: Edited by Peter Crowther
- Cover artist: "Corbis"
- Language: English
- Series: Peter Crowther DAW anthologies
- Genre: Science fiction
- Publisher: DAW Books
- Publication date: 2002
- Publication place: United States
- Media type: Print (paperback)
- Pages: 315
- Preceded by: Moon Shots
- Followed by: Constellations

Mars Probes (2002) is a science fiction anthology of mostly all-new short stories edited by Peter Crowther, the third in his themed science fiction anthology series for DAW Books. The one story that is the exception to appearing here for the first time is a reprint of a Ray Bradbury story from 1968. The stories are all intended to be inspired by the theme of robotic probes on Mars. The book was published in 2002.

The book includes a three-page introduction by Crowther entitled, "The Fascination of Mars", fifteen short stories, and an eleven-page set of author biographies at the end.

== Contents ==
The anthology contains the following stories:

- Ray Bradbury: "The Love Affair"
- Eric Brown: "Myths of the Martian Future"
- Paul Di Filippo: "A Martian Theodicy"
- Alastair Reynolds: "The Real Story"
- Mike Resnick and M. Shayne Bell: "Flower Children of Mars"
- James Lovegrove: "Out of the Blue, Into the Red"
- Scott Edelman: "Mom, The Martians, and Me"
- Ian McDonald: "The Old Cosmonaut and the Construction Worker Dream of Mars"
- Allen Steele: "A Walk Across Mars"
- Stephen Baxter: "Martian Autumn"
- Gene Wolfe: "Shields of Mars"
- Paul McAuley: "Under Mars"
- James Morrow: "The War of the Worldviews"
- Brian W. Aldiss: "Near Earth Object"
- Patrick O'Leary: "The Me After the Rock"
- Michael Moorcock: "Lost Sorceress of the Silent Citadel"

== See also ==
- Mars in fiction
