= Band of Gypsys (novel) =

2005 novel by Gwyneth Jones

- Cover of Gollancz first edition
- Author: Gwyneth Jones
- Language: English
- Series: Bold As Love Sequence
- Genre: Science fiction
- Publisher: Gollancz
- Publication date: 2005
- Publication place: United Kingdom
- Media type: Print (Hardcover & Paperback)
- ISBN: 0-575-07043-9
- OCLC: 82718022
- Preceded by: Midnight Lamp
- Followed by: Rainbow Bridge

Band of Gypsys is a science fiction novel by British writer Gwyneth Jones, published in 2005. It is the fourth of Jones' five book "Bold as Love" sequence (all named after works related to Jimi Hendrix). The book is set in a near-future version of the United Kingdom.

== Plot summary ==
In the last pages of Midnight Lamp a secret military test of the Neurobomb went live, and the altered-brain neuronauts died in the act of wiping out the planet's reserves of fossil fuel. Like the bombs exploded over Hiroshima and Nagasaki, the "A team event" seemed both horrific and benign. The latest US/Islamic conflict was over at a stroke, the terminal sickness of post-peak-oil mercifully cut short. No way back to "business as usual": now there must be a new world, a better world. Band of Gypsys opens, some months later, with a complete change of pace. Having failed to make terms with a corrupt and dangerous Westminster government, the Triumvirate are in Paris, conducting a mordant John and Yoko style, "bed-in" in protest against conditions in English labour camps. Ax gets some bad news. US President Fred Eiffrich, the man who "Banned the Bomb", is doomed: brought down by a cunningly manufactured scandal.

The hour is getting late. The rescue of Ax's family, held as hostages for his good behaviour, shows Ax and friends doing what they do best: extracting bloodless victory from a nasty situation. There is a festival at Reading, there's a clandestine mind/matter tech space programme in the basement of the Heads' Battersea HQ. The ideals of the Rock and Roll Reich are alien to a new, post-Crisis generation. The leaders of fashion are neo-feudalist dandy Jack Vries MP (secret chief of the secret police), and Toby Starborn, sinister young virtual artist. Ax 'n Sage 'n Fiorinda are outdated icons, corpses in the mouths of the bourgeoisie. When Ax and Sage are engulfed in the Lavoisier Massacre Scandal a moment's shocking loss of control precipitates disaster. The Triumvirate find themselves—like many English Royals before them—incarcerated. Once more they are forced to provide rock-star window-dressing for a reactionary and degenerate Green regime, but this time Ax Preston has no miraculous solutions. Locked away in the shadowy, haunted fortress of Wallingham House, the prisoners hear distant echoes of a new blitzkrieg. The Chinese, emerging from their own struggle with the Crisis years, are taking over in Central Asia. They are almost at the gates of Europe.
