= The Old Cosmonaut and the Construction Worker Dream of Mars =

2002 short story by Ian McDonald

- Short story by Ian McDonald
- Country: United States
- Language: English
- Genre: Science fiction

Publication
- Published in: Mars Probes
- Publication type: Anthology
- Publication date: 2002

"The Old Cosmonaut and the Construction Worker Dream of Mars" is a 2002 science fiction short story by Ian McDonald. It was first published in the anthology Mars Probes and received positive reviews upon release, with several critics considering it the best or one of the best stories in the anthology.

== Synopsis ==
The story follows two characters in parallel universes, both with dreams of Mars exploration: a retired Estonian cosmonaut and a young Indian labourer. The cosmonaut was scheduled to go on the first human mission to Mars when the space program was scrapped, and still longs for the red planet. The construction worker has a low-paying job operating a remotely controlled robot on the surface of Mars as part of a terraforming effort. The two end up meeting each other in a "quantum space" where their universes come into contact.

== Publication history ==
The story was originally published in the 2002 anthology Mars Probes, edited by Peter Crowther. It was later republished in the 2003 anthology The Year's Best Science Fiction: Twentieth Annual Collection, edited by Gardner Dozois.

== Reception ==
F. Brett Cox, in an August 2002 review of Mars Probes for Locus Online, praised the short story's characterization and hard science fiction aspects, as well as the way McDonald fitted those elements together. Cox deemed it a contender for the best story in the anthology, saying "it does just about everything you might want an SF story to do".

In a 2002 review of Mars Probes for SF Site, Rich Horton found "The Old Cosmonaut and the Construction Worker Dream of Mars" a good example of a "serious" science fiction story, describing it as thought-provoking. Horton however thought that story did not quite live up to the standards set by McDonald's previous work Ares Express, the 2001 sequel to his 1988 novel Desolation Road.

James Schellenberg, reviewing Mars Probes for Canadian science fiction magazine Challenging Destiny in September 2003, called McDonald's story a tour de force, commending the world-building and the sense of melancholy conveyed. In Schellenberg's opinion, the story is "worthy of any praise".

Robert Crossley, in his 2011 non-fiction book Imagining Mars: A Literary History, calls the story a "wonderful fable" and commends it for taking what he considers a novel approach to the subject. In Crossley's opinion, "The Old Cosmonaut and the Construction Worker Dream of Mars" is the best of the stories in Mars Probes; he contrasts it favourably with the other stories in the anthology such as Paul Di Filippo's "A Martian Theodicy" and James K. Morrow's "The War of the Worldviews" that take a backward-looking and nostalgic perspective on Mars fiction, saying that it "skillfully captures the paradoxical nature of imagined Mars in the post-Robinson era" (i.e. after the publishing of Kim Stanley Robinson's 1992–1996 Mars trilogy).

Besides Crossley and Cox, Gardner Dozois also described it as "[t]he best story in Mars Probes" in his summation of the year 2002 in science fiction in The Year's Best Science Fiction: Twentieth Annual Collection.

== See also ==
- Mars in fiction
