= Tales in Time =

- Cover illustration of Tales in Time
- Author: edited by Peter Crowther
- Language: English
- Genre: Science fiction short stories
- Publisher: White Wolf Publishing
- Publication date: 1997
- Publication place: United States
- Media type: Print (Paperback)
- Pages: 285 pp
- ISBN: 978-1-56504-989-5
- Preceded by: Three in Time

Tales in Time is an anthology of science fiction short stories about time (though not necessarily, as is usual in the genre, time travel), edited by Peter Crowther. It was first published as a trade paperback by White Wolf Publishing in April 1997. It was issued as a companion to Three in Time from the same publisher; the two books were followed up by a similar pair, Three in Space and Tales in Space, published in 1998.

The book collects thirteen tales by various authors, together with a foreword by the editor and an essay by genre critic John Clute.

== Contents ==
- "Foreword" (Peter Crowther)
- "Time and the Human Condition" (John Clute)
- "The Very Slow Time Machine" (Ian Watson)
- "The Love Letter" (Jack Finney)
- "On the Watchtower at Plataea" (Garry Kilworth)
- "The Twonky" (Henry Kuttner and C. L. Moore (writing as Lewis Padgett))
- "The New Accelerator" (H. G. Wells)
- "Man in His Time" (Brian W. Aldiss)
- "“—and Subsequent Construction”" (Spider Robinson)
- "Timeskip" (Charles de Lint)
- "A Sound of Thunder" (Ray Bradbury)
- "What We Learned from This Morning's Newspaper" (Robert Silverberg)
- "Jeffty Is Five" (Harlan Ellison)
- "The Isolinguals" (L. Sprague de Camp)
- "The Man Who Walked Home" (James Tiptree, Jr.)
