= Sherlock Holmes and the Christmas Demon =

2019 novel by James Lovegrove

- First edition
- Author: James Lovegrove
- Language: English
- Genre: Mystery novels
- Publisher: Titan Books
- Publication date: 2019
- Media type: Print (hardback)
- Pages: 384
- ISBN: 978-1785658020 (first U.S. edition, hardback)

Sherlock Holmes and the Christmas Demon is a mystery novel by James Lovegrove. It is a Sherlock Holmes pastiche that involves a Krampus-like Christmas demon. The book also makes reference to Philip Jose Farmer’s Wold Newton family.

== Plot ==
December 1890, Eve Allerthorpe visits London from Yorkshire with the aim of asking Sherlock Holmes to aid her. Allerthorpe is due to inherit a large estate on her 21st birthday, just days away, if she is found of sound mind. Recently, there have been chilling tales of the ghost of Allerthorpe's deceased mother and worse; visions of a legend told to her in her childhood, the Black Thurrick.

== Reception ==
Publishers Weekly praised the novel and said that Lovegrove joined "the top rank of authors of traditional Holmes pastiches." Mark Yon of SFFworld enjoyed the book calling it "a deceptively easy read that draws you in and, once started, I found difficult to put down." Sam Tyler of SFbook.com called it "a great Christmas gift for the Sherlock Holmes fan in your life."

Katie Turzansky, manager of Edmonton Public Library's Strathcona branch recommended the book on CBC's Radio Active with Adrienne Pan.
