= Tales in Space =

Short story collection

- Cover illustration of Tales in Space
- Author: edited by Peter Crowther
- Cover artist: Kathleen Ryan
- Language: English
- Genre: Science fiction short stories
- Publisher: White Wolf Publishing
- Publication date: 1998
- Publication place: United States
- Media type: Print (Paperback)
- Pages: 318 pp
- ISBN: 978-1-56504-867-6
- OCLC: 39271901
- Preceded by: Three in Space

Tales in Space is an anthology of science fiction short stories edited by Peter Crowther. It was first published as a trade paperback by White Wolf Publishing in April 1998. It was issued as a companion to Three in Space from the same publisher; the two books followed up a similar pair, Three in Time and Tales in Time, published in 1997.

The book collects fifteen tales by various authors, together with an introduction by the editor.

== Contents ==
- "Introduction" (Peter Crowther)
- "Walking on the Moon" (Allen Steel)
- "The Message from Mars" (J. G. Ballard)
- "Nine Lives" (Ursula K. Le Guin)
- "Visits to Remarkable Cities" (Ian McDonald)
- "The Dark Soul of the Night" (Brian W. Aldiss)
- "The Man who Hated Gravity" (Ben Bova)
- "Recording Angel" (Paul J. McAuley)
- "Pictures Don't Lie" (Katherine MacLean)
- "The Odor of Cocktail Cigarettes" (Ian Watson)
- "The Bone Flute" (Lisa Tuttle)
- "Dream Done Green" (Alan Dean Foster)
- "The Graveyard Cross" (Robert Holdstock)
- "Kaleidoscope" (Ray Bradbury)
- "Picnic on Nearside" (John Varley)
- "Schwartz Between the Galaxies" (Robert Silverberg)
