= The Year's Best Science Fiction: Twentieth Annual Collection =

2003 anthology edited by Gardner Dozois

- Dust cover of first edition
- Editor: Gardner Dozois
- Cover artist: Dominic Harman
- Language: English
- Series: The Year's Best Science Fiction
- Genre: Science fiction
- Publisher: St. Martin's Press
- Publication date: 2003
- Publication place: United States
- Media type: Print (hardcover & trade paperback)
- Pages: xxxix & 648 pp
- ISBN: 9780312308599
- Preceded by: The Year's Best Science Fiction: Nineteenth Annual Collection
- Followed by: The Year's Best Science Fiction: Twenty-First Annual Collection

The Year's Best Science Fiction: Twentieth Annual Collection is an anthology of science fiction short stories edited by Gardner Dozois, the twentieth volume in an ongoing series. It was first published in hardcover and trade paperback by St. Martin's Press in July 2003, with a book club edition co-issued with the Science Fiction Book Club, and an ebook edition following in August of the same year. The first British edition was published in trade paperback by Robinson in December 2003, under the alternate title The Mammoth Book of Best New Science Fiction: 16th Annual Collection.

== Summary ==
The book collects twenty-five novellas, novelettes and short stories by various science fiction authors, with an introductory summation of the year, notes and concluding bibliography by the editor. The stories were previously published in 2002 in various science fiction and other magazines.

== Contents ==
- "Summation: 2002" (Gardner Dozois)
- "Breathmoss" (Ian R. MacLeod)
- "The Most Famous Little Girl in the World" (Nancy Kress)
- "The Passenger" (Paul McAuley)
- "The Political Officer" (Charles Coleman Finlay)
- "Lambing Season" (Molly Gloss)
- "Coelacanths" (Robert Reed)
- "Presence" (Maureen F. McHugh)
- "Halo" (Charles Stross)
- "In Paradise" (Bruce Sterling)
- "The Old Cosmonaut and the Construction Worker Dream of Mars" (Ian McDonald)
- "Stories for Men" (John Kessel)
- "To Become a Warrior" (Chris Beckett)
- "The Clear Blue Seas of Luna" (Gregory Benford)
- "V.A.O." (Geoff Ryman)
- "Winters Are Hard" (Steven Popkes)
- "At the Money" (Richard Wadholm)
- "Agent Provocateur" (Alexander Irvine)
- "Singleton" (Greg Egan)
- "Slow Life" (Michael Swanwick)
- "A Flock of Birds" (James Van Pelt)
- "The Potter of Bones" (Eleanor Arnason)
- "The Whisper of Disks" (John Meaney)
- "The Hotel at Harlan's Landing" (Kage Baker)
- "The Millennium Party" (Walter Jon Williams)
- "Turquoise Days" (Alastair Reynolds)
- "Honorable Mentions: 2002" (Gardner Dozois)

== Awards ==
The anthology placed first in the 2004 Locus Poll Award for Best Anthology.
