= Escape Plans =

English Science Fiction Novel

Escape Plans is a novel by Gwyneth Jones published in 1986.

== Plot summary ==
Escape Plans is a novel in which ruling class dilettante Alice descends into a world fully dependent on their information systems, and a revolution grows.

== Reception ==
Dave Langford reviewed Escape Plans for White Dwarf #78, and stated that "Jones' welter of neologisms and acronyms is initially overwhelming, and I kept furtively turning to the glossary [...] But it's worth wading through the alphabet soup for the story."

== Reviews ==
- Review by Brian Stableford (1986) in Fantasy Review, May 1986
- Review by Paul Kincaid (1986) in Vector 132
