= Postscripts =

British fiction magazine, 2004–2016

First issue cover

Postscripts was a quarterly British magazine of science fiction, fantasy, horror, and crime fiction, first published in June 2004. It was published by PS Publishing and the editor-in-chief was Peter Crowther.

Each issue was published in two editions: a regular newsstand-type edition and a signed, numbered, 200-copy (150 copies until issue 14) hardcover edition.

From issue 18, the magazine was transformed briefly to a quarterly anthology, before becoming biannual, producing two double-sized issues a year starting with issue 20/21. The final issue was The Dragons of the Night #36/37, published in May 2016.

== Awards ==
Postscripts has won the 2006 and 2008 International Horror Guild awards for best periodical and the 2009 British Fantasy Award for Best Magazine.

Notable award-winning stories include Joe Hill's Best New Horror, which won the British Fantasy Award for Best Short Fiction in 2006. In the Porches of My Ears by Norman Prentiss won the 2009 Bram Stoker Award for Superior Achievement in Short Fiction.
