= Sherlock Holmes and The Three Winter Terrors =

2021 mystery novel

- First edition
- Author: James Lovegrove
- Language: English
- Genre: Mystery novels
- Publisher: Titan Books
- Publication date: 2021
- Media type: Print (hardback)
- Pages: 320
- ISBN: 978-1-789096-71-2 (first U.S. edition, hardback)

Sherlock Holmes and The Three Winter Terrors is a mystery novel by James Lovegrove. It is a Sherlock Holmes pastiche consisting of three linked tales spanning five years.

== Reception ==
Publishers Weekly praised the book saying the "solid characterizations match the imaginative plotting" while conceding "this isn’t at the level of Lovegrove's best work." Starburst gave the book five stars calling it "Another delightful seasonal treat from James Lovegrove."
