= Dr. Franklin's Island =

2002 book by Gwyneth Jones

- Book cover
- Author: Ann Halam
- Language: English
- Genre: Horror
- Publisher: Orion Publishing Group
- Publication date: 2001
- Publication place: England
- Media type: Print
- Pages: 245
- ISBN: 1-85881-396-4

Dr. Franklin's Island is a young adult science fiction book by Ann Halam published in 2001. It is narrated in the first person. Loosely based on H. G. Wells' 1896 novel The Island of Dr. Moreau, it tells the story of three teenagers who end up on an island owned by Dr. Franklin, a brilliant but insane scientist, who wants to use them as specimens for his transgenic experiments.

== Plot ==
A plane to a research facility in Ecuador crashes in the ocean and the only survivors are three children: Semi Garson, the female narrator; Miranda, a brave girl; and a boy called Arnie. They must swim to the nearby island and survive on their own. Soon Arnie disappears and the girls are taken hostage on the island by Dr Franklin and his assistant Dr Skinner, who perform transgenic experiments on them. This transforms Miranda into a bird and Semi into a manta ray, who can still communicate through radio chips planted in their new bodies. It is revealed that the missing Arnie, also a prisoner of Dr. Franklin, is eavesdropping on them and reporting their conversations to the scientists. Arnie tells the two girls that there is a cure to their condition and says that he will try to help them by obtaining it. Semi soon begins to covertly receive the treatment, learning that Skinner is sneaking her the doses of antidote.

Skinner frees her from the lockup, horrified by the experiments. Semi, now a full human again, finds a snake and discovers that it is Arnie. They are recaptured by Franklin, who also have Miranda trapped in a net. They attack in a desperate last stand, and the scientist is killed after smashing into an electric fence. Semi, Miranda and Arnie escape to the mainland in a boat. On the way home, Semi gives Miranda and Arnie the antidote, and they return to being human.

They arrive in Ecuador, where they tell a cover story for their adventures (not mentioning Franklin's "treatment"), and are returned happily to their parents. The story ends with Semi's concerns that the transgenic DNA is still in their cells, and that they may have specific cues that will return them to being animals, and her dreams for a world that will allow her and Miranda to become the creatures they were on the island without barriers between them.

== Reception ==
Debbie Carton of Booklist praised the novel for the moving narrative, which she said adeptly illustrated "the teens' concern with appearance and conformity" despite their quandary. Journalists of Publishers Weekly called the book a "nightmarish thriller of white-knuckle intensity" and lauded its "[rich] characterizations". Elizabeth Bush of The Bulletin of the Center for Children's Books noted that the novel "would be no more than a B-movie embarrassment" had Halam not skillfully "pull[ed] her plot together" at the end. Jane P. Fenn of School Library Journal called it "an astonishing and terrifying science fiction adventure". Roger Sutton of The Horn Book Guide to Children's and Young Adult Books wrote that although Dr. Franklin's Island has "overhasty plotting", it is "a solid adventure story informed by ethical questions of current import". Victoria Neumark of Times Educational Supplement noted that the story was viable because Halam based it on "an almost banal teen perspective". Journalists of Teacher Magazine commented that the novel "effectively addresses animal rights issues and the ethics of genetic engineering".
