= Forbidden Planets =

2006 anthology edited by Peter Crowther

- First edition
- Author: Edited by Peter Crowther
- Language: English
- Series: Peter Crowther DAW anthologies
- Genre: Science fiction anthology
- Publisher: DAW Books
- Publication date: 2006
- Publication place: United States
- Media type: Print (paperback)
- Pages: 307
- Preceded by: Constellations
- Followed by: We Think, Therefore We Are

Forbidden Planets (2006) is a science fiction anthology of all-new short stories edited by British writer and journalist Peter Crowther, the fifth in his themed science fiction anthology series for DAW Books. The stories are all intended to be inspired by the 1956 movie, Forbidden Planet. The book was published in 2006.

The book includes a two-page introduction by Ray Bradbury; twelve short stories; an eight-page afterword entitled "Forbidden Planet", written by Stephen Baxter; and an eleven-page section of author and story notes.

Coincidentally, another science fiction anthology entitled Forbidden Planets was also published in 2006, edited by Marvin Kaye.

The stories are as follows:

- Matthew Hughes: "Passion Ploy"
- Jay Lake: "Lehr, Rex"
- Paul McAuley: "Dust"
- Alastair Reynolds: "Tiger, Burning"
- Paul Di Filippo: "The Singularity Needs Women!"
- Stephen Baxter: "Dreamers' Lake"
- Chris Roberson: "Eventide"
- Scott Edelman: "What We Still Talk About"
- Ian McDonald: "Kyle Meets the River"
- Michael Moorcock: "Forbearing Planet"
- Alex Irvine: "This Thing of Darkness I Acknowledge Mine"
- Adam Roberts: "Me-Topia"
