= Sherlock Holmes and the Sussex Sea-Devils =

2018 novel by James Lovegrove

- Author: James Lovegrove
- Language: English
- Genre: Mystery novels
- Publisher: Titan Books
- Publication date: 2018
- Media type: Print (hardback)
- ISBN: 978-1783295975 (first U.S. edition, hardback)
- Preceded by: Sherlock Holmes and the Miskatonic Monstrosities

Sherlock Holmes and the Sussex Sea-Devils is a mystery novel by James Lovegrove. It is a Sherlock Holmes pastiche that involves H. P. Lovecraft's Cthulhu Mythos. It is the third book in The Cthulhu Casebooks series following Sherlock Holmes and the Shadwell Shadows and Sherlock Holmes and the Miskatonic Monstrosities.

== Plot ==
Having retired to a farm near Eastbourne, Sherlock Holmes is forced back into action to investigate the death of his brother Mycroft. Detecting the hand of R’luhlloig, Holmes and Watson are drawn into a battle that leads to R’lyeh, the Pacific island dwelling place of Cthulhu.

== Reception ==
The Guardian said "Lovegrove is a grandmaster of the Sherlock Holmes homage, and no slouch when it comes to describing Lovecraftian horrors: Sherlock Holmes and the Sussex Sea-Devils is thoroughly compelling." Mark Yon of SFFWorld said "Sherlock Holmes and the Sussex Sea-Devils is the culmination of this series and if you’ve liked the previous two novels you’ll like this one. Overall, the series has been a pleasant surprise, and is recommended." Starburst wrote of The Cthulhu Casebooks trilogy stories: "they are enjoyably suspenseful, with the mystery such as it is being played out with fervent, well-paced writing"; and said of Sea-Devils "Allow your mind to wander and you may well enjoy this novel for the fun story it is." Peter Meinertzhagen of Sublime Horror said "The final book in James Lovegrove’s The Cthulhu Casebooks triptych of Holmes & Lovecraft mash-ups brings the series to a grand betentacled finale and leaves you wondering why the collision of these two worlds works so well... It simply wishes to make you smile and, for that, it deserves a recommendation." Sam Tyler in SFBook Reviews wrote "...this is a very well written and entertaining novel that pays homage to the legacy of two great creations and embarrasses neither."
