= Sherlock Holmes and the Shadwell Shadows =

2016 novel by James Lovegrove

- Author: James Lovegrove
- Language: English
- Genre: Mystery novels
- Publisher: Titan Books
- Publication date: 2016
- Media type: Print (hardback & paperback)
- ISBN: 9781783295937 (first U.S. edition, hardback)
- Followed by: Sherlock Holmes and the Miskatonic Monstrosities

Sherlock Holmes and the Shadwell Shadows is a mystery novel by James Lovegrove. It is a Sherlock Holmes pastiche that involves H. P. Lovecraft's Cthulhu Mythos. It is the first book in Lovegrove's Cthulhu Casebooks trilogy. The second novel, Sherlock Holmes and the Miskatonic Monstrosities, was released in November 2017 and a third, Sherlock Holmes and the Sussex Sea-Devils, in November 2018.

== Plot ==
A series of mysterious deaths inspire Sherlock Holmes and Dr. Watson to investigate the criminal element of the East End of London. Their investigation leads to crime lord Gong-Fen Shou but further opens their eyes to the existence of something much worse.

== Reception ==
Reviewers have praised Lovegrove's use of Doyle's characters within a Lovecraftian conceit. Glenn Dallas of Seattle Book Review said "Lovegrove does an outstanding job of evoking Doyle’s style and mixing in healthy dollops of the macabre and fantastic that define the Cthulhu Mythos." The Guardian said of the novel, "The pastiche is pitch-perfect; Lovegrove tells a thrilling tale and vividly renders the atmosphere of Victorian London." Starburst magazine said of the book "It retains the spirit of classic Holmes, while the integration of Lovecraft mythos is handled with careful aplomb." Bob Byrne for Black Gate said "If you like your Holmes with some horror: or if you like Cthulhu tales, I think you are going to like this book." Byrne particularly liked that Lovegrove showed a "unpolished Holmes" early in his career.
