= Peter Crowther =

British writer, editor and publisher (born 1949)

- Born: 4 July 1949 (age 77); Leeds, England
- Occupations: Writer, editor, publisher
- Writing career
- Years active: 1992–present
- Genres: Speculative fiction, sci-fi, fantasy
- Notable works: Founder and editor of PS Publishing, Postscripts
- Notable awards: World Fantasy Special Award—Professional (2004); World Fantasy Special Award—Professional (2008)

Peter Crowther (born 4 July 1949) is a British journalist, short story writer, novelist, editor, publisher and anthologist. He is a founder (with Simon Conway) of PS Publishing, which began in 1998. He edits a series of themed anthologies of science fiction short stories published by DAW Books. He is also the editor of Postscripts, an anthology established in 2004, which has since 2012 released the Exotic Gothic series, including Vol. 4 and 5.

Crowther received the 2023 World Fantasy Award for Life Achievement. He has won a variety of British Fantasy Awards, primarily as editor. He's also a two-time winner of the World Fantasy Special Award—Professional.

Crowther's short stories are generally in the horror or fantasy genre. His first published science fiction was "The Antique Restorer" in Science Fiction Monthly for September 1975. The stories are included in several collections.

== Bibliography ==
=== Series ===
==== Forever Twilight ====
- Book One: Darkness, Darkness (2002)*
- Book Two: Windows of the Soul (2009)*

* significantly expanded into Darkness Falling, The Forever Twilight (2011, Angry Robot) – ISBN 978-0857661685

=== Standalone novels ===
- Escardy Gap (1996) (with James Lovegrove) – ISBN 978-0671016050
- After Happily Ever (2000) (with Gillian Roberts) (Cassette) – ISBN 978-1552046432
- By Wizard Oak (2011) – ISBN 978-0979505485

=== Chapbook form ===
- Forest Plains (1996)
- Fugue on a G-String (1998)
- The Hand That Feeds (1999) (with James Lovegrove)
- Gandalph Cohen and the Land at the End of the Working Day (2000)
- All We Know of Heaven (2001) – ISBN 978-1842990322

=== Collections of short stories ===
- The Longest Single Note and Other Strange Compositions (1999) – ISBN 978-1881475569
- Lonesome Roads (1999) – ISBN 978-0953146819
- Cold Comforts (2001) (CDRom)
- Songs of Leaving (2004)
- The Spaces Between the Lines (2007)
- The Land at the End of the Working Day (2008)
- Jewels in the Dust (2013)
- Things I Didn't Know My Father Knew (2021)

=== Short stories ===
- Blue Christmas (1991)
- Constant Companion (1992)
- The Visitor (1992)
- Fallen Angel (1993)
- Rustle (1993)
- Morning Terrors (1994)
- All We Know of Heaven (1995)
- Bindlestiff (1995)
- A Breeze from a Distant Shore (1995)
- Conundrums to Guess (1995)
- Home Comforts (1995)
- The Invasion (1995)
- Too Short a Death (1995)
- The Bachelor (1996)
- The Fairy Trap (1996)
- Halfway House (1996)
- Surface Tension (1996)
- A Worse Place Than Hell (1996)
- "Boxing Day" (1997)
- The Killing of Davis-Davis (1997)
- The Last Vampire (1997)
- Palindromic (1997)
- Safe Arrival (1997)
- Three Plays a Quarter (1997)
- Tomorrow Eyes (1997)
- The Unbetrayable Reply (1997)
- Elmer (1998)
- Front-Page McGuffin and the Greatest Story Never Told (1998)
- "The Musician of Bremen, GA" (1998)
- Some Burial Place, Vast and Dry (1998)
- Cat On an Old School Roof (1999)
- The Hand that Feeds (1999) (with James Lovegrove)
- Late Night Pick-up (1999)
- Old Delicious Burdens (1999)
- Setting Free the Daughters of Earth (1999)
- Shatsi (1999)
- "Circling the Drain" (2000)
- Dream a Little Dream for Me... (2000)
- Songs of Leaving (2000)
- Bernard Boyce Bennington And the American Dream (2001)
- "Things I Didn't Know My Father Knew" (2001)
- "Breathing in Faces" (2002)
- "Jewels in the Dust" (2004"
- "The Doorway in Stephenson's Store" (2005)
- "Thoughtful Breaths" (2006)

== Anthologies edited by Crowther ==
- Narrow Houses (1992) – ISBN 978-0316903950
- Narrow Houses Vol 2: Touch Wood (1993) – ISBN 978-0316907323
- Narrow Houses Vol 3: Blue Motel (1994) – ISBN 978-1565049222
- Heaven Sent: 18 Glorious Tales of the Angels (1995) – ISBN 978-0886776565
- Tombs (1996) – ISBN 978-1565049055
- Dante's Disciples (1997) – ISBN 978-1565049079
- Destination Unknown (1997) – ISBN 978-1565049413
- Tales in Time (1997) – ISBN 978-1565049895
- Tales in Space (1998) – ISBN 978-1565048676
- Moon Shots (1999) – ISBN 978-0886778484
- Foursight (1999) – ISBN 978-0575068704
- Taps and Sighs (1999) – ISBN 978-1892284372
- Foursight Vol 2: Futures (2000) – ISBN 978-0575070233
- Mars Probes (2002) – ISBN 978-0756400880
- Foursight Vol 3: Infinities (2002) – ISBN 978-0575073555
- Foursight Vol. 4: Cities (2003) – ISBN 978-0575075047
- Foursight Vol. 5: Fourbodings (2005) – ISBN 978-1587670909
- Constellations (2005) – ISBN 978-0756402341
- Forbidden Planets (2006) – ISBN 978-0756403300
- We Think, Therefore We Are (2009) – ISBN 978-0756405335

== Literary awards ==
Year Presented	Society	Award	Category	Nominee	Result	Ref
1993	World Fantasy Convention	World Fantasy Awards (1993)	Anthology	Narrow Houses	Nominated	
1998	British Fantasy Society	BFA (1998)	Short Story	"Even Beggars Would Ride" (with James Lovegrove)	Nominated	
2000	British Fantasy Society	BFA (2000)	Best Collection	Lonesome Roads	Won	
2000	British Fantasy Society	BFA (2000)	Short Fiction	"The Hand that Feeds"	Nominated	
2001	World Fantasy Convention	World Fantasy Awards (2001)	Special – Non-Pro	PS Publishing	Nominated	
2001	British Fantasy Society	BFA (2001)	Small Press	PS Publishing	Won	
2002	World Fantasy Convention	World Fantasy Awards (2002)	Special – Non-Pro	PS Publishing	Nominated	
2002	British Fantasy Society	BFA (2002)	Small Press	PS Publishing	Won	
2002	British Fantasy Society	BFA (2002)	Anthology	Futures	Nominated	
2003		International Horror Guild Award	long form	"Breathing in Faces"	Nominated	
2003	World Fantasy Convention	World Fantasy Awards (2003)	Special – Non-Pro	PS Publishing	Nominated	
2003	British Fantasy Society	BFA (2003)	Small Press	PS Publishing	Won	
2004	World Fantasy Convention	World Fantasy Awards (2004)	Special – Pro	PS Publishing	Won	
2004	British Fantasy Society	BFA (2004)	Small Press	PS Publishing	Won	
2005	World Fantasy Convention	World Fantasy Awards (2005)	Collection	Songs of Leaving	Nominated	
2005	British Fantasy Society	BFA (2005)	Small Press	PS Publishing	Nominated	
2005	British Fantasy Society	BFA (2005)	Small Press	Postscripts (with Nick Gevers)	Nominated	
2006	British Fantasy Society	BFA (2006)	Small Press	PS Publishing	Won	
2006	British Fantasy Society	BFA (2006)	Anthology	Fourbodings: A Quartet of Uneasy Tales from Four Members of the Macabre	Nominated	
2007	British Fantasy Society	BFA (2007)	Small Press	PS Publishing	Won	
2008	World Fantasy Convention	World Fantasy Awards (2008)	Special – Pro	PS Publishing	Won	
2008	British Fantasy Society	BFA (2008)	Small Press	PS Publishing	Won	
2008	British Fantasy Society	BFA (2008)	Small Press	Postscripts	Nominated	
2009	British Fantasy Society	BFA (2009)	Best Magazine/Periodical	Postscripts (with Nick Gevers)	Won	
2010	World Fantasy Convention	World Fantasy Award (2010)	Special – Pro	PS Publishing (with Nicky Crowther)	Nominated	
2012	British Fantasy Society	BFA (2012)	Special Award	(with Nicky Crowther)	Won	
2012	British Fantasy Society	BFA (2012)	Novella	"Ghosts with Teeth"	Nominated	
2013	World Fantasy Convention	World Fantasy Awards (2013)	Special – Pro	PS Publishing (with Nicky Crowther)	Nominated	

== Other media ==
- In the television series Fear Itself, an episode of Season 1 ("Eater") is based on the short story of the same name. The same story had previously been adapted as an episode of the British horror anthology series Urban Gothic.

== Cultural references ==
- Crowther has been mentioned in Alan Hollinghurst's 2005 novel The Line of Beauty, in the very first lines.
