= Roger Levy =

British science fiction writer

Roger Levy is a British science fiction writer. He is published by Gollancz and Titan. His books are deeply melancholic, and explore issues of belief (with a focus on religion) and the nature of reality. He has been compared to Philip K. Dick in that regard, though he could be said to operate more within the British disaster novel tradition.

== Books by Roger Levy ==
- Reckless Sleep, 2001, Gollancz
- Dark Heavens, 2004, Gollancz
- Icarus, 2006, Gollancz
- The Rig, 2018, Titan
