= Sherlock Holmes and the Miskatonic Monstrosities =

Mystery fantasy novel by James Lovegrove

- Author: James Lovegrove
- Language: English
- Genre: Mystery novels
- Publisher: Titan Books
- Publication date: 2017
- Media type: Print (hardback)
- ISBN: 978-1783295951 (first U.S. edition, hardback)
- Preceded by: Sherlock Holmes and the Shadwell Shadows
- Followed by: Sherlock Holmes and the Sussex Sea-Devils (2018)

Sherlock Holmes and the Miskatonic Monstrosities is a mystery novel by James Lovegrove. It is a Sherlock Holmes pastiche that involves H. P. Lovecraft's Cthulhu Mythos. It is the second book in Lovegrove's The Cthulhu Casebooks trilogy, with the first novel, Sherlock Holmes and the Shadwell Shadows, having been released a year previously.

== Plot ==
15 years after the events of the Shadwell Shadows, Holmes and Watson are notified that an American is being held at Bethlem Royal Hospital and is continually writing the same three phrases in R'lyehian. A search for his identity leads to an American biologist from Miskatonic University in New England and more experiences with eldritch horrors in London.

== Reception ==
The Guardian wrote about Miskatonic Monstrosities: "the characterisation, especially of Watson, is superb. This novel will delight fans of Doyle and Lovecraft alike" and suggested the novel "cleverly mirrors" Sir Arthur Conan Doyle's A Study in Scarlet and The Valley of Fear. Bob Byrne for Black Gate was less enthused about this novel than he was about the previous book in the trilogy, saying "Fully one-third of this novel has nothing to do with Holmes or Watson" and "Watson seems particularly harsh towards Holmes in this book".
