= Gwyneth Jones (novelist) =

English novelist (born 1952)

- Born: 14 February 1952 (age 74); Manchester, England
- Education: University of Sussex
- Occupations: Novelist, critic
- Writing career
- Pen name: Ann Halam
- Language: English
- Genres: Science fiction, high fantasy
- Notable work: Bold as Love (2001)
- Notable awards: World Fantasy Award, BSFA short story award, Children of the Night Award, Arthur C. Clarke Award, Philip K. Dick Award, James Tiptree Jr. Award
- Website: boldaslove.co.uk/blog/

Gwyneth Jones (born 14 February 1952) is an English science fiction and fantasy writer and critic, and a young adult/children's writer under the pen name Ann Halam.

== Biography and writing career ==
Jones was born in Manchester, England. Education at a convent school was followed by an undergraduate degree in European history of ideas at the University of Sussex. She has written for younger readers since 1980 under the pseudonym Ann Halam and, under that name, has published more than twenty novels. In 1984 Divine Endurance, a science fiction novel for adults, was published under her own name and in which she created the term gynoid. She continues to write using these two names for the respective audiences.

Jones' works are mostly science fiction and near future high fantasy with strong themes of gender and feminism. She is the winner of two World Fantasy Awards, BSFA short story award, Children of the Night Award from the Dracula Society, the Arthur C. Clarke Award, the Philip K. Dick Award and co-winner of the James Tiptree Jr. Award. She also won the 2008 Pilgrim Award for lifetime achievement in Science Fiction criticism. She is generally well-reviewed critically and, as a feminist science fiction writer, is often compared to Ursula K. Le Guin, though the two authors are very much distinct in both content and style of work.

Jones lives in Brighton, England, with her husband and son.

== Bibliography ==
=== Novels ===
Name	Published	ISBN	Notes
Water in the Air	London: Macmillan, 1977	ISBN 0-333-22757-3	as Gwyneth A Jones
The Influence of Ironwood	London: Macmillan, 1978	ISBN 0-333-23838-9	as Gwyneth A Jones
The Exchange	London: Macmillan, 1979	ISBN 0-333-26896-2	as Gwyneth A Jones
Dear Hill	London: Macmillan, 1980	ISBN 0-333-30106-4	as Gwyneth A Jones
Divine Endurance	London: George Allen & Unwin, 1984	ISBN 0-04-823246-7	
Escape Plans	London: Allen & Unwin, 1986	ISBN 0-04-823263-7	Arthur C. Clarke Award nominee, 1987
Kairos	London: Unwin Hyman, 1988	ISBN 0-04-440163-9	Arthur C. Clarke Award nominee, 1989
The Hidden Ones	London: The Women's Press, 1988 (paper)	ISBN 0-7043-4910-8	
Flower Dust	London: Headline, 1993	ISBN 0-7472-0846-8	
White Queen	London: Gollancz, 1991	ISBN 0-575-04629-5	Book 1 of The Aleutian Trilogy; James Tiptree, Jr. Award Winner (tie), 1991; Arthur C. Clarke Award nominee, 1992
North Wind	London: Gollancz, 1994	ISBN 0-575-05449-2	Book 2 of The Aleutian Trilogy; BSFA nominee, 1994; Arthur C. Clarke Award nominee, 1995
Phoenix Cafe	London: Gollancz, 1997	ISBN 0-575-06068-9	Book 3 of The Aleutian Trilogy
Bold as Love	London: Gollancz, 2001	ISBN 0-575-07030-7	Book 1 in the Bold As Love Cycle; Arthur C. Clarke Award winner, 2002; BSFA nominee, 2001; British Fantasy Award nominee, 2002
Castles Made of Sand	London: Gollancz, 2002	ISBN 0-575-07032-3	Book 2 in the Bold As Love Cycle; British Science Fiction Award nominee, 2002
Midnight Lamp	London: Gollancz, 2003	ISBN 0-575-07470-1	Book 3 in the Bold As Love Cycle; British Science Fiction Award nominee, 2003; Arthur C. Clarke Award nominee, 2004
Band of Gypsys	London: Gollancz, 2005	ISBN 0-575-07043-9	Book 4 in the Bold as Love Cycle
Rainbow Bridge	London: Gollancz, 2006 (paper)	ISBN 0-575-07715-8	Book 5 in the Bold As Love Cycle
Life	Seattle, WA: Aqueduct Press, 2004 (paper)	ISBN 0-9746559-2-9	Philip K. Dick Award winner, 2005; James Tiptree, Jr. Award shortlist, 2004;
Spirit: or The Princess of Bois Dormant	London: Gollancz, 2008	ISBN 978-0-575-07473-6	Arthur C. Clarke Award nominee, 2010
The Grasshopper's Child	London: Self-published, 2014 (ebook)	ISBN	Book 6 in the Bold As Love Cycle

=== Fiction collections ===
- Identifying the Object. Austin: Swan Press, 1993 (paper). No ISBN
- Seven Tales and a Fable. Cambridge: Edgewood Press, 1995 (paper). ISBN 0-9629066-5-4
- Grazing the Long Acre. Hornsea: PS Publishing, 2009. ISBN 978-1-906301-56-9
- The Buonarotti Quartet. Seattle: Aqueduct Press, 2009 (paper).
- The Universe of Things. Seattle: Aqueduct Press, 2011 (trade paper). ISBN 978-1-933500-44-7

=== Short stories ===
- "Red Sonja and Lessingham in Dreamland" (1996) in Off Limits: Tales of Alien Sex (anthology) and (2007) in Rewired: The Post-Cyberpunk Anthology (anthology)
- "Saving Tiamaat" (2007) in The New Space Opera (anthology)
- "The Ki-anna" (2010) in Engineering Infinity (anthology)
- "A Planet Called Desire" (2015) in Old Venus (anthology)

=== Non-fiction ===
- Deconstructing the Starships: Science, Fiction and Reality. Liverpool: Liverpool University Press, 1999. ISBN 0-85323-783-2
- Imagination / Space. Seattle, WA: Aqueduct Press, 2009 (paper).
- Joanna Russ. Urbana, IL: University of Illinois Press, 2019. ISBN 978-0-252-05148-7

=== As Ann Halam ===
- Ally, Ally, Aster. London: Allen & Unwin, 1981. ISBN 0-04-823192-4
- The Alder Tree. London: Allen & Unwin, 1981. ISBN 0-04-823205-X
- King Death's Garden. London: Orchard Books, 1986. ISBN 1-85213-003-2
- The Inland trilogy
  - The Daymaker. London: Orchard Books, 1987. ISBN 1-85213-019-9
  - Transformations. London: Orchard Books, 1988. ISBN 1-85213-119-5
  - The Skybreaker. London: Orchard Books, 1990. ISBN 1-85213-183-7
- Dinosaur Junction. London: Orchard Books, 1992. ISBN 1-85213-369-4
- The Haunting of Jessica Raven. London: Orion, 1994. ISBN 1-85881-050-7
- The Fear Man. London: Orion, 1995. ISBN 1-85881-158-9
- The Powerhouse. London: Orion, 1997. ISBN 1-85881-405-7
- Crying in the Dark. London: Dolphin, 1998 (paper). ISBN 1-85881-394-8
- The N.I.M.R.O.D. Conspiracy. London: Dolphin, 1999 (paper). ISBN 1-85881-677-7
- Don't Open Your Eyes. London: Dolphin, 1999 (paper). ISBN 1-85881-791-9
- The Shadow on the Stairs. Edinburgh: Barrington Stoke, 2000 (paper). ISBN 1-902260-57-0
- Dr. Franklin's Island. London: Orion/Dolphin, 2001. ISBN 1-85881-396-4
- Taylor Five. London: Dolphin, 2002 (paper). ISBN 1-85881-792-7
- Finders Keepers. Edinburgh: Barrington Stoke, 2004 (paper). ISBN 1-84299-203-1
- Siberia. London: Orion, 2005. ISBN 1-84255-129-9 (shortlist, Booktrust Teenage Prize)
- Snakehead. London: Orion, 2007. ISBN 1-84255-526-X
