= Victor Gollancz Ltd =

British publishing company

- Parent company: Orion Publishing Group
- Founded: 1927; 99 years ago
- Founder: Victor Gollancz
- Country of origin: United Kingdom
- Headquarters location: London
- Publication types: Books
- Fiction genres: Science fiction, fantasy, horror
- Imprints: Gateway
- Official website: www.gollancz.co.uk

Victor Gollancz Ltd (/ɡəˈlænts/) was a major British book-publishing house of the 20th century and continues to publish science-fiction and fantasy titles as an imprint of Orion Publishing Group.

Gollancz, founded in 1927 by Victor Gollancz, specialised in the publication of high-quality literature, nonfiction, and popular fiction, including crime, detective, mystery, thriller, and science fiction. Upon Gollancz's death in 1967, ownership passed to his daughter, Livia, who in 1989 sold it to Houghton Mifflin. In October 1992, Houghton Mifflin sold Gollancz to publishing house Cassell & Co. Cassell and its parent company Orion Publishing Group were acquired by Hachette in 1996, and in December 1998, the merged Orion/Cassell group turned Gollancz into its science-fiction/fantasy imprint.

== Origins as a political house ==
A Gollancz edition of The Door into Summer, displaying the distinctive yellow dust jacket style

Gollancz was left-inclined in politics and a supporter of socialist movements. This is reflected in some of the call for the books he published. Victor Gollancz commissioned George Orwell to write about the urban working class in the North of England; the result was The Road to Wigan Pier. His break with Orwell came when he declined to publish Orwell's account of the Spanish Civil War, Homage to Catalonia, the pair having drifted apart on political grounds. He did publish The Red Army Moves by Geoffrey Cox on the Winter War, which was critical of the Soviet attack on Finland, but also foresaw that the Red Army would defeat the Germans. He also published works by German exiles, such as Hilde Meisel.

Gollancz was the original publisher of a number of authors and their books, including:

- George Orwell with Down and Out in Paris and London in 1933
- Alfred Ayer with Language, Truth and Logic in 1936
- A. J. Cronin with The Citadel in 1937
- Daphne du Maurier with Rebecca in 1938
- Kingsley Amis with Lucky Jim in 1953
- Colin Wilson with The Outsider in 1956
- John le Carré with Call for the Dead in 1961
- E. P. Thompson with The Making of the English Working Class in 1963
- Anthony Price with The Labyrinth Makers in 1971.

Many of Gollancz's books were published in house dust jackets, one of which was bright yellow, with the title and author rendered in typography.

The Left Book Club, the first book club in the UK, was a publishing group pioneered by Gollancz that exerted a strong left-wing influence in Great Britain from 1936 to 1948. It offered a monthly book choice, for sale to members only, as well as a newsletter that acquired the status of a major political magazine. It also held an annual rally. Membership peaked at 57,000, but it eventually ceased publishing in 1948. The books and pamphlets were published with their distinctive covers — orange for paperback (1936–1938) and red for hardback (1938–1948) editions.

== Transition to science fiction and fantasy genres ==
From the early 1960s through the late 1990s, Gollancz Science Fiction was the pre-eminent hardcover science-fiction publishing list in the UK, for the first quarter century, being both recognisable by, and famous for, its distinctive Gollancz Yellow dust-jackets with black and magenta typography, providing a major part of the publisher's output, alongside Gollancz' crime-fiction and general-fiction lists. Full-colour dust jackets were introduced on the science-fiction list from the mid-1980s adding significantly to production costs, but also to commercial sales - an important consideration with increasing pressure upon the UK's public library system's budgets. In 1998, Gollancz was diminished into just the science-fiction and fantasy imprint Gollancz Science Fiction after it was acquired by Orion Publishing Group. Gollancz has also proceeded to publish the SF Masterworks series, and the Fantasy Masterworks series previously appearing under the Orion sister-imprint Millennium. Gollancz has published award-winning and award-nominated books by, among others:

- Joe Abercrombie
- J. G. Ballard (later works)
- Stephen Baxter
- Greg Bear
- Jonathan Carroll
- Mark Chadbourn
- Arthur C. Clarke
- Michael Coney
- Robert Cormier
- Peter Delacorte
- Philip K. Dick
- Thomas Disch
- Stephen R. Donaldson
- Greg Egan
- Christopher Evans
- Jaine Fenn
- Maggie Furey
- Mary Gentle
- William Gibson
- Jon Grimwood
- Michael Harrison
- Joe Hill
- Robert Holdstock
- Stephen Hunt
- Gwyneth Jones
- Graham Joyce
- Ursula K. Le Guin
- Roger Levy
- James Lovegrove
- Scott Lynch
- Paul McAuley
- Ian McDonald
- George R. R. Martin
- Richard Morgan
- Terry Pratchett
- Christopher Priest
- Robert V. S. Redick
- Alastair Reynolds
- Keith Roberts
- Adam Roberts
- Patrick Rothfuss
- Geoff Ryman
- Brandon Sanderson
- Andrzej Sapkowski
- Robert J. Sawyer
- Robert Shaw
- Dan Simmons
- Alison Sinclair
- John Sladek
- Bruce Sterling
- Jack Vance
- Ian Watson
- H. G. Wells
- Gene Wolfe

== Expansion into manga ==
In 2005, Gollancz set up a manga publishing arm, Gollancz Manga, which published UK editions of various Viz Media properties. As of 2014, Gollancz no longer publish manga and Viz Media have re-released the publisher's series.

The following titles have been published:

Case Closed	volumes 1–15
Dragon Ball	volumes 1–16
Dragon Ball Z	volumes 1–4
Fushigi Yūgi	volumes 1–17
Flame of Recca	volumes 1–10
Maison Ikkoku	volumes 1–15
One Piece	volumes 1–12
Rurouni Kenshin	volumes 1–16
Yu-Gi-Oh!	volumes 1–7
Yu-Gi-Oh! Duelist	volumes 1–15

== SF Gateway website ==
In 2011, Gollancz launched the SF Gateway website, an online library intended to bring thousands of out-of-print science fiction books back into circulation as e-books. Gollancz aimed to make more than 5,000 titles available by 2014, and launched the project alongside the online third edition of ''The Encyclopedia of Science Fiction'' (SFE), which was integrated with SF Gateway through links between encyclopedia entries and Gateway titles.

The encyclopedia website's October 2011 launch date was chosen to coincide with the debut of SF Gateway as part of Gollancz's fiftieth-anniversary celebrations, at the insistence of publisher Malcolm Edwards. Although the two projects were initially closely linked, the relationship weakened after Edwards left Orion in 2019 and SF Gateway was redesigned. Following the end of Gollancz's partnership with the encyclopedia, the SFE launched an independent fourth edition in October 2021 and continued as a separate project.

== Accolades ==
In terms of the number of published works that have been nominated for major awards, Gollancz ranks as one of the field's top publishers of science fiction, fantasy and horror fiction.

== Book series ==
- Common Sense
- Left Book Club
- New People's Library
