= James Lovegrove =

British writer of speculative fiction (born 1965)

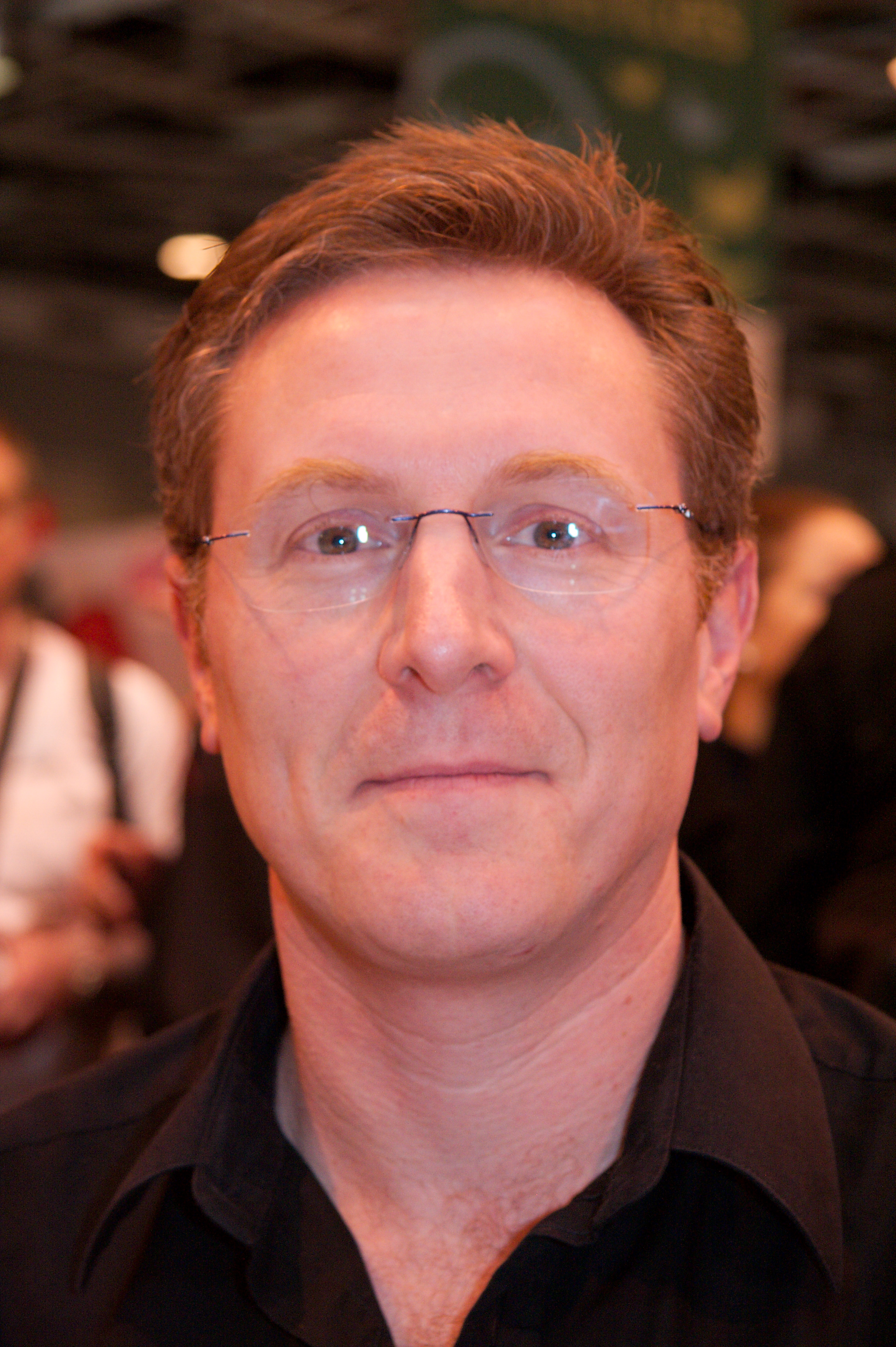
- Lovegrove at Salon du livre 2008 (Paris, France)
- Born: James Matthew Henry Lovegrove; 24 December 1965 (age 60); Lewes, East Sussex, England
- Education: Radley College; University of Oxford
- Occupation: writer
- Writing career
- Pen name: Jay Amory
- Language: English
- Genre: Speculative fiction
- Subjects: Science fiction, Mystery, Fantasy, Horror, Young adult fiction
- Notable work: Pantheon series
- Notable awards: Seiun Award
- Website: jameslovegrove.com

James M. H. Lovegrove (born 1965) is a British writer of speculative fiction.

== Early life ==
James Lovegrove was educated at Radley College, Oxfordshire, and was one of the subjects of a 1979 BBC television series, Public School. A follow-up programme was broadcast on 27 October 2013, in which Lovegrove talked about his experiences of attending the school and about public school education in general. He later studied English literature at St Catherine's College, Oxford.

== Career ==
Lovegrove's first novel was The Hope, published by Macmillan in 1990. He was nominated for the Arthur C. Clarke Award in 1998 for his novel Days and for the John W. Campbell Memorial Award in 2004 for his novel Untied Kingdom. His short story "Carry The Moon in My Pocket" won the 2011 Seiun Award in Japan for Best Foreign Language Short Story.

Lovegrove has written young adult fiction, most notably a series of fantasy novels, The Clouded World, under a pseudonym (Jay Amory). These have been translated into nine languages so far. He has also written a number of short novels published by Barrington Stoke, a company specialising in books for reluctant readers. Two of his titles for that company have been longlisted for the Manchester Book Award.

His recent Pantheon series is a set of standalone military science fiction adventure novels featuring the gods of ancient mythologies. Seven have been published so far: The Age of Ra, The Age of Zeus, The Age of Odin (a New York Times best seller), The Age of Aztec, Age of Voodoo, Age of Shiva, Age of Heroes and Age of Legends. In 2013, Lovegrove published an omnibus collecting three Pantheon novellas, entitled The Age of Godpunk.

As an illustrator, Lovegrove has executed design and poster work for Flying Pig Systems, makers of the Wholehog range of lighting control products, and drew the pictures for the Echo Beach line of postcards and T-shirts.

He has contributed reviews and journalism to magazines such as The Literary Review, Interzone, BBC MindGames Magazine and Comic Heroes, and has set cryptic crosswords to the weekend section of The Independent. Starting in 2007, he became a regular reviewer of fiction for the Financial Times, concentrating primarily on SF and children's fiction.

Since 2013 Lovegrove has begun publishing Sherlock Holmes pastiche novels for Titan Books, including a mash-up trilogy, Cthulhu Casebooks, that crosses over the literary worlds of Sir Arthur Conan Doyle and H.P. Lovecraft.

From 2018, he has also written Firefly novels for Titan Books. His first Firefly novel Big Damn Hero was nominated for the 2019 Dragon Award for Best Media Tie-In Novel and his third (The Ghost Machine) won the 2020 award in the same category. His second Firefly novel The Magnificent Nine was nominated for a 2020 Scribe Award (awarded by the International Association of Media Tie-in Writers) in the category Original Novel Speculative and his third Firefly novel The Ghost Machine was nominated for a 2021 Scribe Award in the same category.

== Bibliography ==
=== Novels ===
- The Hope, Macmillan 1990, ISBN 0-333-51214-6
- Days, Gollancz 1997, ISBN 0-7538-0228-7
- Escardy Gap (with Peter Crowther), Earthlight/Tor 1998 ISBN 9780312862107
- The Foreigners, Gollancz 2000, ISBN 0-575-06894-9
- Untied Kingdom, Gollancz 2003, ISBN 0-575-07385-3
- Worldstorm, Gollancz 2004, ISBN 0-575-07656-9
- Provender Gleed, Gollancz 2005, ISBN 0-575-07683-6
- Better Life, CreateSpace Independent Publishing Platform, 2014, ISBN 150560933X
- The James Lovegrove Collection, Volume #1, REBCA, 2014, ISBN 1781082669

=== Redlaw ===
- Redlaw, Solaris Books, 2011, ISBN 978-1-907992-04-9
- Redlaw Red Eye, Solaris Books, 2012, ISBN 978-1781080481

=== The Dev Harmer Missions ===
- World of Fire, 2014, Solaris Books, ISBN 978-1781082065
- World of Water, 2016, Solaris, ISBN 978-1781083055

=== The Pantheon Series ===
- The Age of Ra, Solaris Books, 2009, ISBN 1-84416-746-1
- The Age of Zeus, Solaris Books, 2010, ISBN 978-1-906735-68-5
- The Age of Odin, Solaris Books, 2011, ISBN 978-1-907519-41-3
- Age of Aztec, Solaris Books, 2012, ISBN 978-1-907992-81-0
- Age of Godpunk, Solaris Books, 2013, ISBN 1781081298
- Age of Voodoo, Solaris Books, 2013, ISBN 978-1-781080-86-3
- Age of Shiva, Solaris Books, 2014, ISBN 978-1-781081-81-5
- Age of Heroes, Solaris Books, 2016, ISBN 978-1781084052
- Age of Legends, Solaris Books, 2019 ISBN 9781781085776

=== Sherlock Holmes pastiches ===
==== The New Adventures of Sherlock Holmes ====
- Sherlock Holmes: The Stuff of Nightmares, Titan Books 2013, ISBN 978-1781165416
- Sherlock Holmes: Gods of War, Titan Books 2014, ISBN 978-1781165430
- Sherlock Holmes: The Thinking Engine, Titan Books 2015, ISBN 978-1783295036
- Sherlock Holmes: The Labyrinth of Death, Titan Books 2017, ISBN 978-1785653377
- Sherlock Holmes: The Devil's Dust, Titan Books 2018, ISBN 978-1785653612
- Sherlock Holmes and the Christmas Demon, Titan Books 2019, ISBN 9781785658020
- Sherlock Holmes and the Beast of the Stapletons, Titan Books, 2020, ISBN 978-1789094695
- Sherlock Holmes & The Three Winter Terrors, Titan Books, 2021, ISBN 978-1789096712

==== The Cthulhu Casebooks ====
- Sherlock Holmes and the Shadwell Shadows, Titan Books 2016, ISBN 978-1783295937
- Sherlock Holmes and the Miskatonic Monstrosities, Titan Books 2017, ISBN 978-1783295951
- Sherlock Holmes and the Sussex Sea-Devils, Titan Books 2018, ISBN 978-1783295975
- Sherlock Holmes and the Highgate Horrors, Titan Books 2023, ISBN 978-1803361550

==== Sherlock Holmes Short Fiction ====
- The Fallen Financier, in George Mann (ed.), Encounters of Sherlock Holmes, Titan Books, 2013, ISBN 1781160031
- The Innocent Icarus, in David Thomas Moore (ed.), Two Hundred and Twenty-One Baker Streets, Abaddon, 2014, ISBN 1781082219
- Pure Swank, in George Mann (ed.), Associates of Sherlock Holmes, Titan Books, 2016, ISBN 1783299304
- The Noble Burglar, in George Mann (ed.), Further Associates of Sherlock Holmes, Titan Books, 2017, ISBN 9781783299324
- The Adventure of the Deadly Séance, in Martin Rosenstock (ed.), Sherlock Holmes: The Sign of Seven, Titan Books, 2019, ISBN 1785659030
- The Manifestations of Sherlock Holmes (collection of 12 short stories), Titan Books, 2020, ISBN 978-1789092004

=== Firefly ===
- Big Damn Hero, Titan Books 2018, ISBN 978-1-78565-826-6 (original story concept by Nancy Holder)
- The Magnificent Nine, Titan Books 2019, ISBN 978-1-78565-829-7
- The Ghost Machine, Titan Books 2020, ISBN 978-1789092240
- Life Signs, Titan Books 2021, ISBN 978-1789092271

=== The Clouded World Series ===
(writing as Jay Amory)

- The Fledging of Az Gabrielson (2006), ISBN 0575079800
- Pirates of the Relentless Desert (2007), ISBN 0575080329
- Darkening for a Fall (2008), ISBN 9780575083721
- Empire of Chaos (2008), ISBN 978-0-575-08024-9
- The Wingless Boy, collecting vols. #1 and #2 (2008), ISBN 0575083719
- The Clouded World, collecting vols. #3 and #4 (2008), ISBN 0575083727

=== Children's books ===
- The Web: Computopia, Dolphin, 1998, ISBN 9781857988703
- Wings, Barrington Stoke, 2001, ISBN 9781842991930
- The House of Lazarus, Barrington Stoke, 2003, ISBN 9781842991251
- Ant God, Barrington Stoke, 2005, ISBN 9781842993293
- Cold Keep, Barrington Stoke, 2006, ISBN 9781842993637
- Kill Swap, Barrington Stoke, 2007, ISBN 9781842994474
- Freerunner, Barrington Stoke, 2009, ISBN 9781842996065
- Dead Brigade, Barrington Stoke 2007, ISBN 9781842995082
- Warsuit 1.0, Bloomsbury Publishing PLC, 2012, ISBN 1408151537
- The Black Phone, Bloomsbury Publishing PLC, 2012, ISBN 9781408163337

=== The 5 Lords of Pain ===
- The 5 Lords of Pain 1: The Lord of the Mountain, Barrington Stoke, 2010, ISBN 1842997599
- The 5 Lords of Pain 2: Lord of the Void, Barrington Stoke, 2010, ISBN 1781122539
- The 5 Lords of Pain 3: The Lord of Tears, Barrington Stoke, 2010, ISBN 1781122563
- The 5 Lords of Pain 4: The Lord of the Typhoon, Barrington Stoke, 2010, ISBN 1842998161
- The 5 Lords of Pain 5: The Lord of Fire, Barrington Stoke, 2010, ISBN 184299817X

=== Novellas ===
- The Hand that Feeds (with Peter Crowther), Maynard Sims Productions, 1999, ISBN 0-9536066-0-0
- How the Other Half Lives, PS Publishing 1999, ISBN 9781902880006
- Gig, PS Publishing, 2004. A double-novella, ISBN 9781902880839

=== Short story collections ===
- Imagined Slights, Gollancz 2002, ISBN 1-85798-801-9
- Diversifications, PS Publishing 2010, ISBN 978-1-84863-128-1

=== Other fiction ===
- Contributed a short story ("Lobsters") to The Thirteenth Floor Anthology, Rebellion 2026, ISBN 9781837866038

=== Non-fiction ===
- Lifelines and Deadlines: Selected Nonfiction, Steel Quill Press, 2015, ISBN 191093500X
