= The Prefect =

Book by Alastair Reynolds

Aurora Rising
- Author: Alastair Reynolds
- Original title: The Prefect
- Language: English
- Series: Revelation Space
- Genre: Science fiction
- Publisher: Gollancz
- Publication date: 2 April 2007
- Publication place: United Kingdom
- Media type: Print (Hardback)
- Pages: 512 pp
- ISBN: 0-575-07716-6
- OCLC: 76851606
- Dewey Decimal: 823/.92 22
- LC Class: PR6068.E95 P74 2007
- Preceded by: Absolution Gap
- Followed by: Elysium Fire

Aurora Rising (originally published as The Prefect) is a 2007 science fiction novel by Welsh author Alastair Reynolds. It is the fifth novel set in the Revelation Space universe, and takes place prior to the four previously released Revelation Space novels, but after some of the short stories. A sequel, Elysium Fire, was released in January 2018, followed by Machine Vendetta in 2024.

While the novel takes place in the Revelation Space universe, it had little connection to the other novels when originally released. As of 2023, two sequels have been published, and the author has described these books as constituting "a sort of universe within a universe".

== Setting ==
=== The Glitter Band ===
The Prefect is set in the 25th century in the Glitter Band, the realm of thousands of orbital habitats surrounding the planet Yellowstone in the Epsilon Eridani system, and the height of human civilization at the time. Events take place prior to the advent of the Melding Plague that had already ruined the Glitter Band and caused a massive decline in Yellowstone civilization at the time of the other Revelation Space novels. Tom Dreyfus is the titular prefect, a member of a special investigations police force called Panoply that is responsible for protecting the Glitter Band.

The novel offers a thoroughly in-depth study of future technology, including augmented reality within the Revelation Space universe, owing to its unique setting in the time-line. Set a century before the devastating effects of the melding plague, the book is able to showcase the golden age of mankind alluded to in earlier books. The Glitter Band is a group of ten-thousand orbital habitats orbiting Yellowstone with a population of 100-million humans.

All habitats in the glitter band represent a different format of society, all linked by the common right to vote. A giant computer network runs thousands of polls everyday to decide the general actions of the Glitter Band as a whole. Most inhabitants have built in computer routines in their brains that make these decisions for them, making a conscious effort on only the most important polls.

Every habitat has a polling core, a giant computer that generates the polls and transmits the inhabitants’ votes. Each habitat votes on its own laws and punishments, the only universal crime being withholding someone's right to vote, fraudulent voting, or restricting someone's access to abstraction (a form of digital communication and virtual reality used throughout the Glitter Band).

The right to vote and access abstraction for each inhabitant is policed by the Glitter Bands’ security force, Panoply. Chasm City is policed independently, and most habitats have their own internal constabulary forces to police other crimes.

=== Panoply ===
Panoply is the police force for the Glitter Band. It exists in its own dedicated habitat, governed by a lightly armed force of Prefects.

The prefect hierarchy is the following:

- Cadet: Prefect in training.
- Prefect: Freshly graduated Prefect, but not yet qualified for assignments outside of Panoply
- Field Prefect: Prefects experienced enough to police the Glitter Band.
- Senior Prefect: Field Prefects that have shown themselves experienced enough to serve the administration of Panoply. Usually working from an office, they still retain field status.
- Supreme Prefect: The chief of the entire organisation. At the start of the novel, this position is held by Jane Aumonier.

Panoply does not have the right to carry armed weaponry as standard, with the exception of whip-hounds, electronic whips that are used primarily in defence. If Panoply feels the need to use heavier weaponry, this must be voted on by the entire Glitter Band in an emergency poll before any action can be undertaken (although Panoply command ignores this limitation in the novel, and uses heavy weapons in spite of a vote against it). In this regard, Panoply can only exist if the populace is happy for them to proceed, which defuses much potential tension in this particular society. One issue the Prefects have to grapple with is that they can only enforce the right to vote and access to abstraction; they are not permitted to stop any other human rights violations. This eventually drives Prefect Gaffney to assist Aurora, the antagonist, in her takeover bid.

== Plot summary ==
The novel begins with Dreyfus being sent out on a routine assignment to lock down a glitter-band habitat for polling violations. His superiors send one of his deputies, Thalia Ng, to distribute software upgrades around the Glitter Band to prevent anyone from attempting a similar violation.

In the meantime, Dreyfus is sent to investigate the recent destruction of a habitat named Ruskin-Sartorious. Analysis indicates that the habitat has been destroyed by the flame of a Conjoiner Drive, and Dreyfus's team believe the lighthugger Accompaniment of Shadows, the only one to have been near the habitat in recent weeks, is responsible. Before they can conclude their investigation, however, the Ultranauts take justice into their own hands and destroy the ship, but not before Dreyfus is able to converse with the captain, who convinces him that his crew were not responsible. Believing him to be truthful, Dreyfus and his deputy, the hyperpig Sparver, decide to investigate the matter further.

Dreyfus and Sparver interview digital backups of the inhabitants of Ruskin-Sartorious. Dreyfus speaks with one of them about the Clockmaker, an alien machine which formerly lived in a Glitter Band research centre, creating, as its name suggests, clocks, before it began a violent killing spree and was destroyed with nuclear weapons nine years prior to the novel. He and Sparver then analyse communication records from the Ruskin-Sartorious habitat, and discover links with an orbiting asteroid owned by the Nerval-Lermontov family (a member of which was called Aurora). They defeat its defence systems and penetrate inside, discovering a Conjoiner starship trapped inside. One of them, Clepsydra, has escaped and is hiding. She meets with Dreyfus and tells him that she and the other Conjoiners had been enslaved by Aurora (now an extremely powerful software entity) to use the Exordium to predict the future. The Conjoiners predict a future devastated by what is implied to be the Melding Plague, and Aurora has been planning to respond to stop it (use of the Exordium creates a new timeline which can be changed to avoid the future the Exordium describes). She and Dreyfus escape as a ship under Aurora's control arrives and destroys the habitat.

At the same time, Thalia has distributed the software upgrade to the required four habitats across the Glitter Band, but it appears to be malfunctioning; information access is shut down in the habitats she has visited, and servitors (service robots used across the Glitter Band) are rounding up and exterminating civilians. She and some of the survivors of the last habitat take refuge in its polling core tower, barricading the entrance. Outside, the servitors begin to construct "weevil" war machines using plans stolen by Gaffney, a Senior Prefect secretly in alliance with Aurora.

Back at Panoply, with Dreyfus in the field and out of communication, Gaffney manipulates the Senior Prefects into voting Aumonier out of office. Clepsydra is taken into isolation, whilst Dreyfus explains the situation to the Senior Prefects. Unbeknownst to him, however, Gaffney kills Clepsydra and frames Dreyfus. The Prefects debate what to do about the emergence of the weevils, which have now left the four original habitats and are moving towards others.

Before very long, however, Gaffney is exposed as the murderer of Clepsydra when attempting to interrogate Dreyfus. He admits to his role in the weevil outbreak and informs the Prefects that Aurora is responsible. Aurora herself contacts Panoply and demands that they stand down, claiming to be taking over the Glitter Band for its own good. Aumonier, now back in power, refuses and orders Panoply to ready for war. Although Thalia escapes from Aurora's forces during a disastrous attack by Panoply, simulations run by the Prefects indicate that they have virtually no chance of success; the weevils are destroying habitats and converting them into even more weevils, grossly outnumbering the Prefects.

Aumonier speaks to Dreyfus and tells him that the aforementioned Clockmaker was not actually destroyed nine years previously; part of it survived and was recovered by Panoply. The ultra-secret Panoply unit, Firebrand, was established to research it. Although Aumonier ordered it shut down, she now believes its members relocated the Clockmaker to Ruskin-Sartorious. As the Clockmaker was the only intelligence in the Glitter Band capable of defeating Aurora, she attempted to destroy it. Dreyfus confronts members of Firebrand, who confirm Aumonier's theory, but reveal that the Clockmaker was not in fact destroyed; Firebrand became aware of the attack in advance and moved the Clockmaker. Following them to the surface of Yellowstone, he and Sparver fight their way into an abandoned Amerikano colony, where the Clockmaker is being hidden. Sparver leaves to fight Gaffney, who is approaching the colony with bombs to destroy the Clockmaker.

Dreyfus meets with the Clockmaker, who reveals that he is actually Philip Lascaille, a character in Revelation Space who was believed to have committed suicide after meeting with the Shrouders, but was in fact scanned to produce a simulation, which was sent back to the Shrouders, who turned it into the Clockmaker. Dreyfus tells the Clockmaker what is happening. It incapacitates him and leaves. Regaining consciousness, Dreyfus meets with Sparver. They return to Panoply to find that the weevil attack has collapsed; the Clockmaker has uploaded itself into the Glitter Band's data network and is fighting a digital war with Aurora. As such, she is unable to control the weevils effectively, and the Prefects are destroying them in alliance with the Ultras. Dreyfus begins preparing to investigate the death of Philip Lascaille, having promised the Clockmaker he would bring those responsible to justice.

== Sequel and new title ==
On 25 July 2017 Alastair Reynolds announced on his blog that his next book Elysium Fire would be a direct sequel to The Prefect which itself would be given the new title Aurora Rising, the better to fit with the Panoply stories being a series in their own right within the Revelation Space universe.

== See also ==
- Revelation Space universe
