= Beyond the Aquila Rift =

Short story collection by Alastair Reynolds

- First edition (UK)
- Author: Alastair Reynolds
- Language: English
- Genre: Science fiction
- Publisher: Gollancz (UK); Subterranean Press (US)
- Publication date: 30 June 2016
- Publication place: United Kingdom
- Media type: Print (hardback & paperback)
- Pages: 781
- ISBN: 978-1-4732-1636-5
- OCLC: 945105570
- Dewey Decimal: 823/.92 23
- LC Class: PR6068.E95 A6 2016

Beyond the Aquila Rift is a 2016 collection of science fiction short stories and novellas by British author Alastair Reynolds, published by Gollancz, and edited by Jonathan Strahan and William Schafer. It contains works previously published in other venues. The collection features several stories connected to Reynolds's previous stories and novels. "Great Wall of Mars", "Weather", Last Log of the Lachrymosa, and Diamond Dogs take place in the Revelation Space universe, Thousandth Night takes place in the same universe as House of Suns, and "The Water Thief" takes place in the Poseidon's Children universe.

== Stories ==
| Title | First appearance | Date |
|---|---|---|
| "Great Wall of Mars" | Spectrum SF 1 | 2000 |
| "Weather" | Galactic North | 2006 |
| "Beyond the Aquila Rift" | Constellations | 2005 |
| Minla's Flowers | The New Space Opera | 2006 |
| "Zima Blue" | Postscripts #4 | 2005 |
| "Fury" | Eclipse Two: New Science Fiction and Fantasy | 2008 |
| "The Star Surgeon's Apprentice" | The Starry Rift | 2008 |
| "The Sledge-Maker's Daughter" | Interzone #209 | 2007 |
| Diamond Dogs | Diamond Dogs, Turquoise Days | 2003 |
| Thousandth Night | One Million A.D. | 2005 |
| Troika | Godlike Machines | 2010 |
| "Sleepover" | The Mammoth Book of Apocalyptic SF | 2010 |
| "Vainglory" | Edge of Infinity | 2008 |
| "Trauma Pod" | Armored | 2012 |
| The Last Log of the Lachrymosa | Subterranean Online | 2014 |
| "The Water Thief" | Arc 1.1 | 2008 |
| "The Old Man and the Martian Sea" | Life on Mars | 2011 |
| "In Babelsberg" | Reach for Infinity | 2014 |

== Adaptations ==
On 10 March 2019 Alastair Reynolds announced that his short story "Beyond the Aquila Rift" was adapted as part of Netflix's animated anthology Love, Death & Robots. This story, along with "Zima Blue", are the first of Reynolds's works to be adapted for TV or film.

== See also ==
- Revelation Space universe
