= Redemption Ark =

2002 novel by Alastair Reynolds

- Redemption Ark cover
- Author: Alastair Reynolds
- Cover artist: Chris Moore
- Language: English
- Series: Revelation Space
- Genre: Science fiction
- Publisher: Gollancz
- Publication date: 31 December 2002
- Publication place: United Kingdom
- Media type: Print (Hardcover and Paperback)
- Pages: 576
- ISBN: 0-575-06879-5
- OCLC: 48236275
- Dewey Decimal: 823/.92 22
- LC Class: PR6068.E95 R43 2002
- Preceded by: Chasm City
- Followed by: Absolution Gap

Redemption Ark is a 2002 science fiction novel by Welsh author Alastair Reynolds set in the Revelation Space universe. It continues the story of Nevil Clavain begun in the short stories "Great Wall of Mars" and "Glacial".

== Plot ==
The novel takes place around the planets Yellowstone and Resurgam, in two story lines which converge near the climax of the novel.

=== Yellowstone ===
The novel begins in the year 2605, where Skade has been tasked with investigating a Conjoiner ship that has returned to the Conjoiner headquarters, the Mother Nest. Skade is a Conjoiner woman who appears to be in touch with secret circles of control within the theoretically egalitarian Conjoiners society. In the ship, she discovers Galiana, the original founder of the Conjoiners, who left Conjoiner space decades previously on an exploration mission. In space, Galiana had encountered the Inhibitors, who unleashed an agent into her ships, seized control, and killed her crew. It now controls her mind as well. Galiana requests that Skade kill her, but Skade only places her in suspended animation in the hope that she can be helped in the future.

Ten years later, Nevil Clavain is facing problems in the Conjoiner mother nest; he is struggling to find answers about what happened to Galiana, whether she is still alive, and about Felka, who he believes may be his and Galiana's daughter. He ponders these concerns during a mission when he ends up rescuing Antoinette Bax as she flies her freighter through the top of the atmosphere of the gas giant Tangerine Dream, to fulfill her promise to her late father to bury him there. Clavain warns her that if he ever sees her again, he'll kill her. Her ship severely damaged, Bax limps back to the Rust Belt, a ring of orbital habitats around Yellowstone, to rejoin her lover, the ship's mechanic.

When Clavain and Skade return to the Mother Nest, Skade, Remontoire, and Felka convince Clavain to join the Conjoiner's leadership, which Clavain had been resisting. Skade informs him about the threat of the Inhibitors and convinces him to undertake a mission to reclaim a cache of lost Conjoiner doomsday weapons. She shows him the fleet of advanced starships that the Conjoiners have been building in secret.

Although Skade claims that she will use the weapons and ships to defend humanity against the Inhibitors, Clavain is convinced that they will simply evacuate and abandon the rest of humanity. Clavain defects to the Demarchists at Yellowstone and spreads the news of the Inhibitors, and also enlists Antoinette Bax's help to escape the Conjoiners under Skade who are pursuing him.

Clavain is followed by Scorpio and Remontoire, but they along with Antoinette and Clavain are captured by the mysterious underground figure known as "H". H reveals what happened to Skade during a Conjoiner raid into Chasm City. This was when Skade discovered the secrets that would lead her to develop inertia suppression technology, and when H believes she was subverted by an alien intellect. Clavain reveals Skade's plans for the Conjoiner fleet and the cache weapons, and H agrees to help him beat Skade to them. H supplies ships and his own version of the inertial suppression technology, while Scorpio supplies an army of hyper-pigs for the pursuit.

Skade and Clavain race to the Resurgam system by employing various strategies, including inertia suppression that pushes their ships to faster relativistic speeds. Eventually, Skade's vessel is damaged in an attempt to use an advanced technology to exceed the speed of light, and she witnesses the death of a crew member trapped in a collapsing bubble.

=== Resurgam ===
Several years later (roughly 50 from the start of the events in the book), Triumvir Ilia Volyova and Ana Khouri are on the planet Resurgam and have discovered a new threat to life: the Inhibitors. Alerted to the presence of humanity during events described in Revelation Space, these swarms of intelligent machines have begun dismantling several rocky moons across the system and are moving their components towards the gas giant, Roc. Volyova and Khouri resolve to evacuate the population of Resurgam, 200,000 people, by posing as government agents to enlist the rebel Thorn in their cause, since he has been attempting to evacuate Resurgam all along. They must also open communications with Captain John Brannigan who is in direct control of their ship, the Nostalgia for Infinity, since his mind and body have fused with the ship's systems, due to the nanotechnological Melding Plague. Volyova tries speaking to the Captain to grant her control of the cache weapons as the last resort against the Inhibitors. (These are the same weapons that Clavain is sent to recover for the Conjoiners. During the events in the novel Revelation Space, Volyova activates the weapons, which allows the Conjoiners in Yellowstone to determine their location.) Volyova persuades Captain Brannigan to let the people evacuate onto the ship, as an ark, that could redeem his past transgressions.

In space, Clavain and Scorpio board Skade's ship to save Felka. Clavain and Scorpio plant explosives as a contingency. After finding Felka but failing to liberate Galiana, they depart and watch Skade's ship explode from a far distance, as Clavain mourns his loss of Galiana.

On Resurgam, Volyova, Khouri, and Thorn begin the lengthy evacuation and preparation of their ship, while the Inhibitors continue their mysterious construction project, suspected to target the system's star. Only a few thousand people are evacuated when the Inhibitors approach Resurgam's star so closely that Volyova scrambles to deploy the cache weapons, in the hope to buy more time. A beta-level simulation of Clavain arrives as data in a laser transmission, and negotiates with Volyova to turn over the cache weapons to him when he arrives on the ship Zodiacal Light. Volyova rejects his persuasive arguments and explains that her need for the weapons is greater than his, so she returns to work on deploying them.

When Zodiacal Light arrives in the system, and because of the failure of his beta-level to negotiate a handover from Volyova, Clavain attacks Nostalgia for Infinity and uses Scorpio and his loyal hyper-pigs as a boarding party. Clavain's superior force captures Nostalgia for Infinity, although Volyova is able to damage Zodiacal Light with one of the cache weapons. The two sides negotiate terms, with Clavain and his crew taking command of Volyova's ship.

They evacuate the colonists more quickly with the help of Antoinette Bax' freighter, Storm Bird. Clavain finds Volyova dying from injuries she sustained when Captain Brannigan attempted to commit suicide by turning a cache weapon against the ship. Volyova makes a final deal with Clavain to take half of the remaining cache weapons and Storm Bird to mount a last-ditch attack on the Inhibitors. Bax bids a teary farewell to the mysterious beta-level simulation that has operated Storm Bird and watched over her, as he says he may find redemption in his last mission with Volyova.

The Inhibitors use their alien technology, built from the matter harvested from the gas giant, Roc, to pierce the layers of Resurgam's star and expose its nuclear fusion core. The radiation energy blasts Resurgam, destroys all its life, and reduces it to a cinder.

Later, Clavain learns Volyova's final attack had no effect. He discovers that Skade narrowly survived their space battle. Clavain reaffirms his goal to return the cache weapons to human control, since they are their creators and true owners. Skade vows to pursue him and seek vengeance for his defection.

Remontoire and Khouri remain in the system aboard the Zodiacal Light to contact Dan Sylveste in the Hades Matrix (seen in the final events of Revelation Space) in the hope that he might provide knowledge they can use to fight the Inhibitors.

The novel ends as Nostalgia for Infinity lands vertically in the ocean of an unnamed Pattern Juggler planet, where the crew and rescued people of Resurgam, all except 40,000, establish a new colony (in the following novel of the series Absolution Gap, the planet is called Ararat). However, the crew is unsure why the Captain/ship chose that planet as a destination. Clavain estimates they'll need about 20 years to wait for the Zodiacal Light to catch up with them so they can resume the fight against the Inhibitors.

Felka reveals her true relationship to Clavain and how his lover Galiana visited this planet hundreds of years ago, where she might have uploaded her mind into the Pattern Jugglers in the ocean. Felka believes Galiana somehow planted the location of the planet without revealing it to the Inhibitors. Clavain and Felka walk towards the shore with renewed hope.

=== Inhibitor Asides ===
In addition to the two plot lines there are occasional asides explaining the history and motivation of the Inhibitors. These asides explain the galaxy was once filled with star-faring civilizations. Those civilizations were largely destroyed in the "Dawn War", a galaxy-wide conflict over the galaxy's scarce resources. One of these civilizations determines that a collision between our galaxy and another will occur in 3 billion years and create/become the Inhibitors in order to shepherd intelligent life through this cataclysm. They had determined that collision could be most easily dealt with if intelligent life was kept isolated to individual star systems, leaving the Inhibitors to perform any necessary manipulations of stars and planets to reduce the damage caused by the collision.

The asides also reveal that the Inhibitors were not as brutal in their past, but their performance has degraded over the millennia. They have been detecting civilizations at later stages, and required to commit wholesale extinction more often.

Clavain and Felka learn of this history during communication with the Inhibitors in Galiana's head. Clavain, however, is not convinced that the Inhibitors are right about the coming catastrophe and believes that their degrading performance may give humanity a chance for survival that other species have not had. As such, he rejects the Inhibitor requests to stand down.

The future collision of our galaxy with the Andromeda Galaxy is a scientifically predicted event. However, astronomers believe that it would not cause major damage to the capability of the galaxy to support life because galaxies are so diffuse that very few, if any, planets and stars would collide.

== Characters ==
- Ana Khouri
- Antoinette Bax
- Captain John Brannigan
- Felka
- Galiana
- Nevil Clavain
- Remontoire
- Schuyler "Sky" Haussmann / "H"
- Scorpio
- Skade
- Thorn
- Triumvir Ilia Volyova

== Awards and nominations ==
- Best Science Fiction Novel of the Year (2002)" by Chronicle

== Release details ==
- 2002, United Kingdom, Gollancz ISBN 0-575-06879-5, Pub date 27 June 2002, Hardback
- 2002, United Kingdom, Gollancz ISBN 0-575-06880-9, Pub date 27 June 2003, Paperback
- 2003, United States, Ace Books ISBN 0-441-01058-X, Pub date 3 June 2003, Hardback
- 2003, United Kingdom, Gollancz ISBN 0-575-07384-5, Pub date 8 May 2003, Paperback
- 2004, United States, Ace ISBN 0-441-01173-X, Pub date 25 May 2004, Paperback

== See also ==
- Revelation Space universe
