= Permanent way (disambiguation) =

Permanent way is the tracks, ballast, subgrade and lineside structure of a railway, see:

- Railway track, description of contemporary permanent way structures and methods
- Permanent way (history), a history of permanent way in the UK

Other uses

- Permanent Way Institution
- The Permanent Way, a play by David Hare about the privatisation of Britain's railways
- "Permanent way" is an important road in the novel Absolution Gap by Alastair Reynolds
