= Galactic North =

2006 short story collection by Alastair Reynolds

- Cover of the original 2006 edition
- Author: Alastair Reynolds
- Language: English
- Genre: Science fiction
- Publisher: Gollancz
- Publication date: 19 October 2006
- Publication place: United Kingdom
- Media type: Print (hardback & paperback)
- ISBN: 978-0-575-07910-6
- OCLC: 77792724
- Dewey Decimal: 823/.92 22
- LC Class: PR6068.E95 G35 2006

Galactic North is a collection of science fiction short stories by British author Alastair Reynolds, published by Gollancz in 2006. It comprises most of Reynold's short stories and novellas set in the Revelation Space universe.

== Stories ==
Title	First appearance	Date	Position in Galactic North
"Great Wall of Mars"	Spectrum SF 1	2000–02	1
"Glacial"	Spectrum SF 5	2001–03	2
"A Spy in Europa"	Interzone 120	1997–06	3
"Weather"	Galactic North	2006	4
"Dilation Sleep"	Interzone 39	1990–09	5
"Grafenwalder's Bestiary"	Galactic North	2006	6
"Nightingale"	Galactic North	2006	7
"Galactic North"	Interzone 145	1999–07	8

Reynolds states in the afterword to the collection that the stories are set in rough chronological order, with "Great Wall of Mars" occurring around AD 2200, whilst Galactic North extends to AD 40 000

== Summary of short stories ==
=== "Great Wall of Mars" ===
In this short story, we meet Nevil Clavain, one of the protagonists of the Revelation Space cycle; Galiana, the founder of the Conjoiner faction; and Sandra Voi, an important person in the Demarchist faction.

The story begins on Deimos, where Nevil Clavain, a high-ranking officer in the Coalition for Neural Purity is preparing to go down to the surface of Mars. His brother, Warren, is pushing for war with the Conjoiners. Eventually, Clavain and Voi depart and fly down towards the Great Wall of Mars, which turns out to be a massive construction that completely envelops part of the planet's surface (enough to cover a city) and the atmosphere above it. As they descend, they are attacked by robotic "worms"- war machines from the previous war with the Conjoiners. Clavain destroys the first worm, but more arrive and kill Voi. Clavain just succeeds in reaching the Conjoiner base. Galiana shows him around and he suggests that the Conjoiners and Coalition team up to attack Phobos, which is apparently infested by the worms. It is revealed that the Conjoiners are constantly deploying shuttles that try to escape the planet, but are always shot down by Coalition satellites. Clavain also meets Felka, a girl who was part of an experiment to further improve human intelligence by altering the brain in the womb. It failed miserably and Felka seems completely uninterested in anything except the mysterious game she is playing – she keeps waving her hands around in a pattern.

While negotiations between Clavain and Galiana are underway, Clavain’s brother Warren broadcasts faked footage of Clavain being killed by the worms when he landed. Clavain concludes that he has been betrayed by his brother, who knew of the worms but hoped to use his brother’s death as an excuse to launch an all-out attack on the base. Clavain is knocked out in the ensuing Coalition attack, but the Conjoiners are able to hold off the first three waves. By then, however, their defences are exhausted and they will not last another attack. During surgery, Clavain receives basic Conjoiner implants, enabling him to see the complicated readouts that surround every Conjoiner and their devices. With these, he can see that Felka is not simply playing a game: she is actually controlling the Great Wall's repair mechanisms. However, the attack has damaged it so badly even she cannot keep it intact for long and soon the wall will collapse, causing the atmospheric pressure inside to be released and tear the base apart. Clavain is confident that the Conjoiners will soon be wiped out.

Galiana reveals the Conjoiners' plans to escape: the shuttles they were sending up were no more than distractions – they were filled with brain-dead clones before they took off. The Conjoiners had really been digging a tunnel that they use to launch spaceships to Phobos, which they have hollowed out and turned into a massive shipyard. The Coalition was unaware the Conjoiners had control of the moon. As Galiana prepares to leave, Clavain first runs back and takes Felka with him, unable to leave without her. They take off and head for Phobos. Galiana warns Clavain that the deceleration upon landing will kill him unless he receives more extensive neural implants. He accepts, knowing he is about to defect from the Coalition.

=== "Glacial" ===
"Glacial" is set a short time after the events of Great Wall of Mars. The Conjoiners have escaped upon their starship, named the Sandra Voi, to an ice planet called Diadem (which orbits the star Ross 248). It is home to an American colony, seeded decades ago by automated robots containing human DNA, but it appears deserted. Everyone is dead and seem to have shown signs of insanity before they died. Clavain is collecting the planet's native worms for studying. He and Galiana explore more of the colony, when they discover a corpse at the bottom of a crevasse. Upon closer inspection, they see the name on the man's spacesuit is "Setterholm". His helmet is detached from his suit, but Clavain realises that he would not have been able to leave the airlock without it being fully attached. He also notices the initials "IVF" carved into the ice nearby.

Later on, Clavain and Galiana find a man frozen in a makeshift reefersleep unit. The Conjoiners fit him with neural implants in order to revive him, and when he regains consciousness, he claims to be Iverson. He is unable to explain the initials that were carved by the dead man. He becomes good friends with Felka (who is now starting to become more human), but Clavain does not trust Iverson. He shows considerable interest in the worms, much like Setterholm was known to have done decades earlier. Eventually it occurs to Clavain that the letters "IVF" may have been the beginning of an attempt to spell "Iverson", with the man dying before he could finish carving the letter "E". However, he is unable to work out why the dead man would try to carve Iverson's name. In the meantime, he and Galiana are still unable to understand why everyone is dead, or why they all seemed to go insane. They eventually discover a sample of Earth bacteria that could have been altered to kill everyone. When they go to question Iverson, he and Felka are missing.

Clavain and Galiana chase Iverson to an ice cave, where they find him and Felka. Galiana takes Felka away, and Clavain and Iverson talk. Clavain has realised by now that "Iverson" is actually Setterholm, who killed the real Iverson and swapped the records of their identities. Setterholm had discovered that the worms and the tunnels they dug through the ice (which were coated in chemicals which determined which way the worms went down them, much like a human brain) had become a massive natural information processor, which he believed either was or was becoming a sentient mind. However, the American fusion reactor needed ice, the mining of which would have killed the worms. In order to protect this intelligence, Setterholm killed everyone in the base. Setterholm denies his identity, but Clavain proves it by smashing an ice pick into the worm colony, causing Setterholm to try and stop him. Clavain offers him the chance to leave, but Setterholm tries to kill him. Clavain then kills Setterholm by causing his neural implants to malfunction. He buries the corpse and returns to the others.

Clavain and his family appear again as characters in Redemption Ark and to a certain extent Absolution Gap, set several centuries later.

=== "A Spy in Europa" ===
This story can be read here at Infinity Plus.

This short story is set on the moon Europa, controlled by the Demarchists. It portrays some of the events leading to the fall of Europa. It is linked with Grafenwalder's Bestiary.

As a result of a second Maunder Minimum, economic power in the Solar System has shifted to the moons around Jupiter. The Europan Demarchy controls Europa and Io; Gilgamesh Isis controls Ganymede and Callisto. Both powers are vying for dominance. Marius Vargovic is a Gilgamesh agent who has been deployed to Europa to meet a woman known as Cholok, who has something that could threaten the cities of Europa. He lands in the city of Cadmus-Asterius, or C-A, a floating city whose top is built into the ice, but which descends eight kilometres into the ocean below. They meet in the city and Cholok reveals that she has a piece of "Hyperdiamond", a carbon compound that is extremely strong – individual molecules can be hundreds of metres in diameter. Floating spheres of vacuum encased in hyperdiamond keep the city from sinking. If Gilgamesh can find a way to tamper with it, they could cause the Europan cities to collapse.

Marius is then operated on to give him the ability to breathe underwater. He asks Cholok about "Denizens", experimental cross-breeds between humans and fish to create the perfect underwater worker. She denies their existence. Marius kills her and leaves the city. As he swims northward to his extraction point, he is informed that it has been compromised. He swims southward, but the Demarchy is trailing him. He meets a group of Denizens who kill the Demarchist agents and inform him that Cholok created them, but the Demarchy turned them away and imprisoned them in their cave. The cave was warm enough to survive in, but if they went outside, their blood would freeze. Normally, they could make "glycoproteins" that would lower their freezing temperature, but the Demarchy has deactivated them. Cholok has, however, inserted a virus into Marius's blood that will reactivate the genes to make the proteins. To get it, they need to drink his blood. As such, they kill him.

=== "Weather" ===
"Weather" follows the activities of an Ultra, Inigo, whose ship Petronel is attacked by pirates. The ship is almost wiped out, but a piece of debris destroys the pirate ship. Inigo discovers a Conjoiner girl hiding on the ship. Inigo's captain allows him to go and find her. She initially refuses to come with them, but Inigo knocks her out with a tranquilliser dart. Inigo's captain insists that she be kept restrained in a radio-shielded cell, as he is convinced that she can control the ship. Inigo talks to the girl who tells him that she cannot tell him her name – as a basic human, he would not be able to process it. She describes it as like the atmosphere of a gas giant, so he gives her the name of Weather.

Inigo continues to speak to Weather as often as he can, but his captain refuses to let her out of her cell. He tells Inigo that he hates Conjoiners (whom he refers to as "Spiders") because in the war against them, they took his wife and turned her into a Conjoiner without her consent. When the two met later on, she no longer seemed to hold any interest in him. Weather tells Inigo that the Conjoiners considered the act a kindness, but failed to realise the effect it would have on loved ones of the people they transformed. Meanwhile, the ship detects an incoming stealth vessel. Inigo, being the shipmaster, is in charge of the engines, but finds that he cannot make them accelerate without danger of nova (this happens if the engines are pushed too hard, if non-Conjoiners attempt to open a Conjoiner Drive to reverse-engineer it, or if the two engines on a ship are allowed to get more than 1 mile away from each other). He gets permission to let Weather look at the engine, but she insists she cannot do anything to help.

Weather speaks to Inigo's captain and repeats a message his wife left for him in the Conjoiner group memory. He lets her further inspect the engines. She opens one up and takes Inigo inside. They discover a brain that the Conjoiners inserted into the engine: it has to calculate the engine's workings to control the energy the drive produces, but has taken damage and cannot process enough information. Weather merges with him, making Inigo promise to bring other Conjoiners to help when they reach their destination. Inigo admits his love for Weather and leaves the engine.

=== "Dilation Sleep" ===
In this story we meet Uri Andrei Sagdev, Starship Heuristic Resource of the ramliner starship Wild Pallas. He is awoken from reefersleep (a form of cryogenic suspension) by Katia, a beta-level simulation of his real wife, who he had left behind on Yellowstone after the Melding Plague. He himself had been unwilling to remove his neural implants until it was too late, forcing him to flee Yellowstone aboard the ship. Katia could not come, so he covertly created a simulation of her to accompany him. She awakes him and informs him that Janos, one of the crewmembers, has been infected with the Melding Plague and needs immediate surgical assistance. As he walks through the ship, he notices he is being followed by a spectral, ghostlike figure, which disappears as he turns on the lights. Despite this, he goes ahead and carries out the operation, only to have the mysterious figure reappear before him. As he removes the last implant from Janos's visual cortex, he is accidentally informed by Katia that he is the one being operated on. The "ghost" was an error caused by the plague also affecting the ship's computer, killing Katia as she informs him of this. He is permanently blinded by the surgery and is unable to recreate the simulation, killing the low-quality copy he does create. The ship, which was carrying refugees from Yellowstone to Earth, cannot slow down in time and instead has to move to Sky's Edge.

=== "Grafenwalder's Bestiary" ===
This story is set on Chasm City, sometime after the Melding Plague. In this story we also get to meet Dr. Trintignant, one of the main characters of the Novella Diamond Dogs.

Grafenwalder is a collector of specimens of alien animals and freak human creations, having them on display in his bestiary. He is especially searching for a Denizen, one of the bio-engineered creatures from the Demarchist society on ancient Europa. Some Ultras arrange for him to get a hamadryad, a very rare animal native to the planet Sky's Edge. When they reveal another collector, Ursula Goodglass, has also got one, he bribes them to kill hers. Later, when Goodglass is showing it off, he reveals that it is in fact dead. Although he is temporarily ahead in the constant competition between animal collectors with his living hamadryad, Goodglass catches up by unveiling the living nervous system of Dr Trintignant. She offers him the choice of killing him or letting him continue to suffer. He chooses the latter. Grafenwalder plans revenge, but is unsure what to do. An Ultra called Rifugio arrives and promises to bring him a Denizen. He provides samples of its DNA, which appear to match Grafenwalder's templates for Denizen DNA. The purchase takes place, but Grafenwalder is unable to detect any sign of intelligence in the Denizen. It is exceptionally strong, but cannot talk and cannot communicate. When Grafenwalder presents it with buttons, it only presses the one that produces food. To make matters worse, Grafenwalder's scientists reveal that it is in fact a fake. Even so, he invites Ursula to see it. She reveals that she is the Denizen, surgically altered to become human. Her real husband died long ago, and the current "husband", who has spent years in his palanquin (a device that blocks out the Melding Plague), is actually Trintignant. Grafenwalder is really a scientist who tried to stop his rival from creating the Denizens, introducing pain and suffering to the Denizens' lives, but gave himself false memories of his life after Europa fell. Ursula has disabled his security system. It is implied that Trintignant turns Grafenwalder into another of his monstrous creations.

=== "Nightingale" ===
At the start of this story, we meet Dexia Scarrow, a soldier on Sky's Edge. Recently, a ceasefire has been declared on the planet, halting the war. She has been summoned by Tomas Martinez, a well known officer who has recently prosecuted an infamous interrogator, Tillman Kessler. Although Kessler has been caught, Martinez is not satisfied. He wants to capture Colonel Brandon Jax, whom Kessler had worked for. Dexia is one of the people Martinez has summoned for his team to carry this out. The others are Ingrid Sollis, an expert at bypassing security doors, Salvatore Nicolosi, an expert at removing people from reefersleep units, and Norbert, Martinez's slow-witted but competent bodyguard. Dexia was invited due to her combat experience. Martinez promises a vast reward in return for successfully bringing Jax in alive. Despite misgivings due to their differing roles in the war, everyone agrees and the team sets off a few days later. When selecting weapons, Scarrow and Sollis are surprised by the fact that Norbert is able to spot the most advanced weapon in Martinez's arsenal and take it.

On the way, Martinez reveals that the ship Jax is hiding on is the Nightingale, a medical ship accessible to both sides during the war. The team are unsettled as it is supposed to have been destroyed, causing some tension between them and Martinez. Still, they continue with the operation. At first, it all goes well, but they start to run into obstacles when their maps don't correspond with the ship's layout. They are also disturbed by the fact that far more of the ship's medical systems are active than would be expected. Eventually, they have to swim through a tank of nutrient fluid which is supporting massive cultures of skin. Machines are harvesting a lot of it, far more than they would have needed for routine testing. At the other end, Nicolosi opens fire on the machines as they notice him. His plasma cannon explodes and wounds him, so the rest of the team fire on the robots. After blasting the door open, they get to the other side, but Martinez is taken down. He reveals that Norbert is in fact Martinez (his inability to form sentences is explained by injuries he sustained during the war. The rest of his brain is still intact). They leave the other Martinez (who is in fact "Quinlan", a stand-in for Martinez). The Nightingale then sends a swarm of robots that incapacitate the team.

Dexia awakens a few hours later in a medical bay, where she speaks to the Nightingale. It permits her to see Jax, whom it will then kill and allow Dexia and the team to take with them. It insists there is no catch and takes her to Jax, whom it has turned into a massive living monument. Jax reveals to Dexia the ship's intentions: it was unable to reconcile itself with the fact that the people it was healing would be returned to the war. As such, it left Sky's Edge and killed everyone on board. It was about to kill Jax, but decided to turn him into a war monument to stop the fighting, and has spent the intervening period working on its masterpiece. It has now decided, however, to replace Jax with Martinez's team, whom she turns into one massive entity, consisting of all five people joined. Back on Sky's Edge, nobody is able to reverse the procedure; the linkages between them are too complex. The Nightingale has also disappeared. The war is over and the characters are now celebrities as a living symbol of the ceasefire, but they have suffered intense psychological damage from the procedure.

=== "Galactic North" ===
This story starts in the year 2303, when Captain Irravel Veda of the lighthugger Hirondelle, her second-in-command Markarian, and some fraction of their Ultranaut crew are ambushed by pirates while engaged in an unexpected repair stopover in a cloud of rocks and cometary matter in the charted but uninhabited star system Luyten 726-8. She briefly considers activating the "Greenfly" terraforming Von Neumann machines being transported on board, which she believes would easily be able to swarm and dismantle the pirate vessel and probably aid in repair as well. She rejects this option, however, and their ship is captured by the infamous terroristic pirate Run Seven. She is tortured to reveal the codes to the security protecting her ship's cargo – twenty thousand colonists' cryopreserved bodies – but refuses due to intense psychological conditioning that makes her view the cargo as her children and do anything to protect them.

She awakens aboard the mostly abandoned Hirondelle some time later, having no memory of the interrogation. She discovers that almost all of the colonists have been taken, while the handful that were left behind have been cut to pieces in order to acquire their tissues and implants; the valuable Greenfly machines they were transporting have also been stolen by Seven. She finds that the pirates' interrogator, Mirsky, has been abandoned with her, while Markarian has been taken. Irravel does not trust her, but Mirsky demonstrates her independence by violently removing the implanted mind-control device that Run Seven had been using to recruit and maintain his crew. They awaken Remontoire, one of the Conjoiner passengers on the Hirondelle and use his expertise to effect repairs and track down the pirates as they flee the system. They catch up with the pirates in 2328, and a battle ensues. In the midst of a tense standoff, however, Irravel's conditioning causes her to strike a deal with Seven, offering him Remontoire and the rest of her crew in exchange for the colonists Seven had abducted. Mirsky then kills Seven, but Irravel takes a hit in the ensuing firefight and dies later. Her body is saved and her brain is scanned into in the ship's computer, brought back as an alpha-level simulation whilst the Hirondelle is orbiting its final destination of Yellowstone in 2415, before the advent of the Melding Plague which would later destroy the nanocybernetic infrastructure making this possible.

By 2658, Irravel has acquired a cloned body of herself. Markarian has disappeared with the remaining colonists and is fleeing aboard the pirates' ship Hideyoshi. Still under the influence of her Ultranaut conditioning, Irravel gives chase, interested in exacting revenge, rescuing the colonists, and learning why Markarian gave up the codes to their security. By 2931 she has followed him to a refuge among the "Nestbuilder" race, from whom she attempts to purchase advanced weapons technology in order to have the advantage against the Hideyoshi during the next encounter. However, the Nestbuilders and their symbiotic species, the Slugs, reveal that while she was travelling at high relativistic velocities, the Greenfly terraformers were unleashed around the star Ross 128 (the same star that Diadem orbits in "Glacial"), and have since malfunctioned, destroying the planets there and turning them into trillions of orbiting bio-domes filled with vegetation. The inhabitants of the star system failed to stop them and were apparently killed in the process. Irravel says that she cannot provide any information that would help the Nestbuilders/Slugs, and leaves on the trail of Markarian again. Mirsky dies an old woman in space in 3354. In their last conversation, they discuss the Greenfly, which they observe by now has begun spreading to other systems, destroying the intelligent societies it was designed to provide for. All attempts at containing the swarm have failed.

In 4161, Irravel stops at the Pleiades cluster and meets distant descendants of the Conjoiners living amongst a race known as the Islanders, who inhabit the planets in the star cluster. Markarian is still fleeing her. She learns that the Greenflies are now consuming whole star systems at a massive rate, surging outward in a fractal pattern in massive swarming tendril-like waves made of substantial fractions of the mass orbiting each star. She also discovers that herself, Markarian, Mirsky, and Seven, their confrontation having unleashed the Greenfly upon the galaxy, have receded into the mists of prehistory and become mythologised as primordial figures. The Islanders put on a play, in which Irravel (unknown to the Islanders) plays herself in a highly ritualised performance, where it is customary for a human bearing the by-then common ancestral name Irravel to play the character. During the feast later that evening, she tries to tell them that she truly is the same person depicted in the Islanders' play, but they disbelieve her, as many Irravels make such insistences with no particular claim to legitimacy. She leaves the next morning, still in pursuit of Markarian.

Eventually, she catches up with the Hideyoshi in AD 9730, by which point the Greenflies have wiped out most of human civilisation. The two ships view this under the effects of heavy time dilation from high above the Galactic Plane (Galactic North), and the two captains discuss the situation. Markarian reveals that they both were involved in a betrayal during that fateful encounter: he gave Run Seven the codes to the colonists' reefersleep caskets when Seven forced him to watch her undergo torture, while she, under the influence of torture, provided Seven and his crew with the Greenflies and their activation codes. They wonder between them if anybody could have survived within the swarm of machine-tended bio-domes. Eventually they detect a message emanating from the swarm, parsed in an ancient human format, tight-beamed directly at them. The message is from Remontoire, who has managed to survive with a small group of Conjoiners orbiting a pulsar (the Greenflies do not attack pulsars, which lack the light to sustain vegetation and usually the mass to build domes). It had taken tens of thousands of years for the light from the relativistic lighthuggers' C Drives to reach and be detected by the galactic plane, and thousands more for their message to arrive at the two ships. The message simply consists of Remontoire begging them for help. Irravel meets the Conjoiners in AD 40,000 on Hope, a hollowed out asteroid the Conjoiners have ejected from the Galaxy. They explore the Hideyoshi and find it abandoned, learning that Markarian has been physically absorbed by the medichines sustaining him in his old age, and exists now only as a collection of software servers which simulate his behaviour. They collect the remaining colonists (whom Markarian has stored as alpha-level neural scans plus complete genetic archives) and prepare to leave the galaxy to re-establish a new civilisation elsewhere, fleeing just ahead of an immense nebular swarm of Greenfly machines which had homed in on Hope as it fled the galactic plane.

The novel Absolution Gap contains a reference to entities in a parallel universe (or at least claiming to be from one) facing attack from an agent very similar to the Greenfly. In their world, the Greenfly gradually consume the entire universe, rendering it uninhabitable. There are references that may imply the alternate universe entities are actually the extreme far future of humanity.

== See also ==
- Revelation Space universe
