= Revelation Space series =

Fictional universe created by Alastair Reynolds

The Revelation Space series is a book series created by Alastair Reynolds. The fictional universe is used as the setting for a number of his novels and stories. Its fictional history follows the human species through various conflicts from the relatively near future (roughly 2200) to approximately 40,000 AD (all the novels to date are set between 2427 and 2858, although certain stories extend beyond this period). It takes its name from Revelation Space (2000), which was the first published novel set in the universe.

== Universe ==
The Revelation Space universe is a fictional universe set in a future version of our world, with the addition of a number of extraterrestrial species and advanced technologies that are not necessarily grounded in current science. It is, nonetheless, somewhat "harder" than most examples of space opera, relying to a considerable extent on science Reynolds believes to be possible; in particular, faster-than-light travel is largely absent. Reynolds has said he prefers to keep the science in his fiction plausible, but he will adopt science he believes to be impossible when it is necessary for the story.

The name "Revelation Space universe" has been used by Alastair Reynolds in both the introductory text in the collections Diamond Dogs, Turquoise Days and Galactic North, and also on several editions of the novels set in the universe. He considered calling it the "Exordium universe" after a key plot device, but found that the name was already in use.

While a great deal of science fiction reflects either very optimistic or dystopian visions of the human future, the Revelation Space universe is notable in that human societies have not developed to either positive or negative extremes. Instead, despite their dramatically advanced technology, they are similar to those of today in terms of their moral ambiguity and mixture of cruelty and decency, corruption and opportunity.

The Revelation Space universe contains elements of Lovecraftian horror, with one posthuman entity stating explicitly that some things in the universe are fundamentally beyond human or transhuman understanding. Nevertheless, the main storyline is essentially optimistic, with humans continuing to survive even in a universe that seems fundamentally hostile to intelligent life.

The name "Revelation Space" appears in the novel of the same name during Philip Lascaille's account of his visit to Lascaille's Shroud, an anomalous region of the local universe. Lascaille says that "the key" to something momentous "was explained to me ... while I was in Revelation Space."

=== Chronology ===
The chronology of the Revelation Space universe extends to roughly one billion years into the past, when the "Dawn War" — a galaxy-spanning conflict over the availability of various natural resources — resulted in almost all sentient life in the galaxy being wiped out. One race of survivors, later termed the Inhibitors, having converted itself to machine form, predicted that the impending Andromeda–Milky Way collision, roughly 3 billion years in our future, may severely damage the capacity of either galaxy to support life. Consequently, they planned to adjust the positions of stars in order to limit the damage the collision would cause. Also central to the Inhibitor project was the eradication of all species above a certain technological level until the crisis was over, as they believed no organic species would be capable of co-operating on such a large-scale project (an in-universe solution to the Fermi paradox). Whilst they were relatively successful, certain advanced species were able to hide from Inhibitor forces, or even fight back.

In human history, during the 21st and 22nd centuries, numerous wars occurred, and a flotilla of generation ships was deployed to colonise a planet orbiting the star 61 Cygni (which becomes a major segment of the plot of Chasm City). The flotilla later reached a planet termed Sky's Edge, which was to be embroiled in war until human civilisation there was eradicated.

Meanwhile, in the Solar System in 2190, a faction known as the Conjoiners emerged as a result of increased experimentation with neural implants. In response, the Coalition for Neural Purity was formed, opposed to the Conjoiners. Nevil Clavain, one of the series's primary protagonists, fought on the side of the Coalition in the ensuing war, but defected later on after being betrayed. Clavain, and the Conjoiners, succeeded in escaping the Solar System and left for surrounding stars.

For the next few centuries, the so-called Belle Epoque, humanity enjoyed a period of relative peace and prosperity, with several planets being colonised. The most successful planet of all was Yellowstone, a planet orbiting the star Epsilon Eridani, site of the Glitter Band / Rust Belt and Chasm City. Technologies developed included the Conjoiner Drive, a gift from the Conjoiners (who resumed contact with humanity at an unknown time), advanced nanotechnology, and numerous other devices. With the exception of an attempted takeover of the Glitter Band, no major incidents affected humanity during this time.

The Belle Epoque was terminated by the advent of the Melding Plague in 2510, a nanotechnological virus that destroyed all other nanotechnology it came into contact with. Only the Conjoiners were unaffected by this disaster, which devastated the civilisation around Yellowstone. War between the Conjoiners and the Demarchists, a rival faction, erupted as a result of the plague.

Meanwhile, activities around a far-flung human colony on the planet Resurgam, orbiting the star Delta Pavonis, inadvertently attracted the attention of the Inhibitors. The Conjoiners, also made aware of this event, sent Clavain to recover the exceedingly powerful "Cache Weapons" from this system (said weapons having been stolen from the Conjoiners centuries before) so that they could be used to fend off the Inhibitors while the Conjoiners escaped. Clavain instead defected from the Conjoiners, intending to use the weapons to protect all of humanity. Skade, another Conjoiner, was sent to stop him and recover the weapons. They fought around the Resurgam system, with Clavain and his allies eventually obtaining the weapons. Clavain's ally Remontoire agreed to seek out alien assistance from the Hades Matrix, a nearby alien computer disguised as a neutron star, whilst Clavain sheltered refugees from Resurgam on another planet, later termed Ararat.

Remontoire returned in 2675, only a few days after Clavain's death at the hands of Skade, who had arrived with him. Remontoire and his allies were now at war with the Inhibitors, assisted by alien technology obtained from Hades. Even so, it was realised that the humans would not last indefinitely, and Clavain's people, now led by Scorpio, decided to seek out the mysterious "Shadows": a race believed to be near a moon called Hela, site of a theocracy. Aura, daughter of Ana Khouri (an ally of Remontoire) infiltrated the theocracy under the pseudonym Rashmika Els. After considerable conflict, Scorpio and Aura realised that contacting the Shadows was inadvisable. With the later assistance of the Conjoiner known as Glass, and of Clavain's estranged brother Warren, Scorpio and Aura (now going by the name Lady Arek) instead succeeded in contacting the Nestbuilders, an alien race who provided them with weapons capable of defeating the Inhibitors. As such, the Inhibitors were effectively eradicated from human space, with buffer zones and frontiers established to keep them at bay.

Humanity then enjoyed a second, 400-year-long golden age. After this, however, came the Greenfly outbreak, in which human civilisation was destroyed by a rogue terraforming system of human origin that destroyed planets and converted them to millions of orbiting, vegetation-filled habitats. The Greenfly began to subsume most of human space, with all efforts to stop them failing, due to the Greenfly having assimilated aspects of both the Melding Plague and Inhibitor technology. The storyline of the Revelation Space universe thus far concludes with humanity leaving the Milky Way galaxy in an attempt to set up a new civilisation elsewhere.

== Books and stories set in the universe ==
All short stories and novellas in this universe to date are collected in Galactic North and Diamond Dogs, Turquoise Days, with the exception of "Monkey Suit", "The Last Log of the Lachrimosa", "Night Passage", "Open and Shut", and "Plague Music".

=== The Inhibitor Sequence ===
1. Revelation Space. London: Gollancz, 2000. ISBN 978-0-575-06875-9.
2. Redemption Ark. London: Gollancz, 2002. ISBN 978-0-575-06879-7.
3. Absolution Gap. London: Gollancz, 2003. ISBN 978-0-575-07434-7.
4. Inhibitor Phase. London: Gollancz, 2021. ISBN 978-0-575-09075-0.

=== Prefect Dreyfus Emergencies ===
1. The Prefect. London: Gollancz, 2007, ISBN 978-0-575-07716-4. (Re-released as Aurora Rising in 2017, ISBN 978-1-473-22336-3)
2. Elysium Fire. London: Gollancz, 2018, ISBN 978-0-575-09059-0.
3. Machine Vendetta. London: Gollancz, 2023, ISBN 978-0-316-46285-3.

=== Standalone ===
1. Chasm City. London: Gollancz, 2001. ISBN 978-0-575-06877-3.

=== Short fiction ===
- "Dilation Sleep" — originally published in Interzone #39 (September 1990); reprinted in Galactic North
- "A Spy in Europa" — originally published in Interzone #120 (June 1997); reprinted in The Year's Best Science Fiction: Fifteenth Annual Collection (1998, ISBN 978-0-312-19033-0), Gardner Dozois, ed.; and in Galactic North; and posted free online at Infinity Plus
- "Galactic North" — originally published in Interzone #145 (July 1999); reprinted in Space Soldiers (2001, ISBN 978-0-441-00824-7), Jack Dann and Gardner Dozois, eds.; and in The Year's Best Science Fiction: Seventeenth Annual Collection (2000, ISBN 978-0-312-26417-8), Gardner Dozois, ed.; and in Hayakawa's SF magazine; and in Galactic North
- "Monkey Suit" — originally published in Death Ray #20 (July 2009); reprinted in Deep Navigation
- "The Last Log of the Lachrimosa" — originally published in Subterranean Online (July 2014); reprinted in Beyond the Aquila Rift
- "Night Passage" — originally published in the SF anthology Infinite Stars by Titan Books (October 2017, ISBN 9781785655937); reprinted in Belladonna Nights and Other Stories, Subterranean Press (2021, ISBN 978-1-64524-013-6)
- "Open and Shut" — A Prefect Dreyfus Emergency short story, originally published on the Gollancz website (January 2018)
- "Plague Music" — originally published in Belladonna Nights and Other Stories, Subterranean Press (2021, ISBN 978-1-64524-013-6)

=== Novellas ===
- "Great Wall of Mars" — originally published in Spectrum SF #1 (February 2000); reprinted in The Year's Best Science Fiction: Eighteenth Annual Collection (2001, ISBN 978-0-312-27465-8), Gardner Dozois, ed.; and in Galactic North and in Beyond the Aquila Rift
- "Glacial" — originally published in Spectrum SF #5 (March 2001); reprinted in The Year's Best Science Fiction: Nineteenth Annual Collection (2002, ISBN 978-0-312-28879-2), Gardner Dozois, ed.; and in Galactic North
- Diamond Dogs — originally published as a chapbook from PS Publishing (2001, ISBN 978-1-902880-27-3); reprinted in Infinities (2002), Peter Crowther, ed.; and in Diamond Dogs, Turquoise Days and in Beyond the Aquila Rift
- Turquoise Days — originally published as a chapbook from Golden Gryphon (2002, no ISBN); reprinted in The Year's Best Science Fiction: Twentieth Annual Collection (2003, ISBN 978-0-312-30860-5), Gardner Dozois, ed.; and in Best of the Best Volume 2: 20 Years of the Year's Best Short Science Fiction Novels (2007, ISBN 978-0-312-36342-0), Gardner Dozois, ed.; and in Diamond Dogs, Turquoise Days
- "Weather" — originally published in Galactic North (2006); reprinted in Beyond the Aquila Rift
- "Grafenwalder's Bestiary" — originally published in Galactic North (2006)
- "Nightingale" — originally published in Galactic North (2006); reprinted in The Year's Best Science Fiction: Twenty-Fourth Annual Collection (2006, ISBN 978-0-312-36335-2), Gardner Dozois, ed.

== Stories in chronological order ==
Title	Chronological Setting	First Published	Format
Great Wall of Mars	AD 2205	2000	Novella
Glacial	AD 2217	2001	Novella
Galactic North	AD 2303–40000 (c.)	1999	Short story
Night Passage	AD 2338	2018	Short story
A Spy in Europa	AD 2330–2340 (c.)	1997	Short story
Weather	AD 2358	2006	Novella
The Prefect/Aurora Rising	AD 2427	2007	Novel - Prefect Dreyfus Emergency #1
Open and Shut	AD 2427	2018	Prefect Dreyfus Short story
Elysium Fire	AD 2429	2018	Novel - Prefect Dreyfus Emergency #2
Machine Vendetta	AD 2431	2024	Novel - Prefect Dreyfus Emergency #3
Diamond Dogs	AD 2500–2550 (c.)	2001	Novella
Monkey Suit	AD 2511	2009	Short story
Plague Music	AD 2512	2021	Short story
Dilation Sleep	AD 2513–2540 (c.)	1990	Short story
Chasm City	AD 2517–2524 (c.)	2001	Novel - standalone
The Last Log of the Lachrimosa	AD 2530	2014	Short story
Turquoise Days	AD 2539-2541	2002	Novella
Grafenwalder's Bestiary	AD 2550 (c.)	2006	Novella
Revelation Space	AD 2524–2567	2000	Novel - Inhibitor Sequence #1
Nightingale	AD 2600	2006	Novella
Redemption Ark	AD 2605–2651	2002	Novel - Inhibitor Sequence #2
Absolution Gap	AD 2615–3300	2003	Novel - Inhibitor Sequence #3
Inhibitor Phase	AD 2780–2858	2021	Novel - Inhibitor Sequence #4
