= Deep Navigation =

2010 anthology by Alastair Reynolds

- First edition
- Author: Alastair Reynolds
- Cover artist: John Picacio
- Language: English
- Genre: Hard sci-fi novel
- Publisher: NESFA Press
- Publication date: February 2010
- Publication place: United States
- Media type: Print (hardcover)
- Pages: 336

Deep Navigation is a collection of short stories by Alastair Reynolds. It was published in February 2010 for the 47th annual Boskone Science Fiction Convention where Reynolds was the Guest of Honour. The collection brings together a number of Reynolds short stories both old and new. His first published story, "Nunivak Snowflakes," right up to "Monkey Suit" which is set in the Revelation Space universe. The book contains an introduction by science-fiction author Stephen Baxter. All the stories published in this anthology had been published previously, but several of them had been out of print for several years.

== Contents ==
- Introduction by Stephen Baxter
- "Nunivak Snowflakes"
- "Monkey Suit"
- "The Fixation"
- "Feeling Rejected"
- "Fury"
- "Stroboscopic"
- "The Receivers"
- "Byrd Land Six"
- "The Star Surgeon's Apprentice"
- "On the Oodnadatta"
- "Fresco"
- "Viper"
- "Soirée"
- "The Sledge-Maker's Daughter"
- "Tiger, Burning"
