= Elysium Fire =

Book by Alastair Reynolds

- Author: Alastair Reynolds
- Language: English
- Series: Revelation Space
- Genre: Science fiction
- Publisher: Gollancz
- Publication date: 25 Jan 2018
- Publication place: United Kingdom
- Media type: Print (hardcover and paperback)
- Pages: 416
- ISBN: 978-0-575-09062-0
- OCLC: 4483302867
- Dewey Decimal: 823/.914
- LC Class: PR6068.E95 2018
- Preceded by: Aurora Rising
- Followed by: Machine Vendetta

Elysium Fire is a 2018 hard science fiction novel by Welsh author Alastair Reynolds. It is a direct sequel to Aurora Rising, taking place in the Revelation Space universe. Reynolds has stated that the novel requires no previous knowledge of Aurora Rising, functioning as a standalone work.

Aurora Rising, Elysium Fire, and Machine Vendetta comprise the Prefect Dreyfus Emergencies series.

== Synopsis ==
Elysium Fire begins two years after the events of Aurora Rising. Senior Prefect Tom Dreyfus and Field Prefect Thalia Ng are investigating a series of strange deaths. Random, unconnected citizens in the Glitter Band are "melting"—the neural implants in their heads rapidly overheating and frying their brains. The meltings begin to occur at an increasing rate, and the Prefects have no idea where to start the investigation. As the meltings are happening, several habitats in the Glitter Band, unhappy with the decisions made by Panoply at the end of Aurora Rising, begin seceding from the Glitter Band and thus no longer fall under the authority of Panoply. Leading the movement to secede is the mysterious Julius Devon Garlin Voi, who seems to have inside knowledge of what has been happening.

== Reception ==
Eric Brown of The Guardian praises Reynolds's world building for the novel, and his ability to populate the far-future technological societies with well rounded characters. Publishers Weekly says "the big concepts and complex story effectively pull readers into intriguing speculation about human identity and potential."
