= Absolution Gap =

2003 novel by Alastair Reynolds

- First edition cover
- Author: Alastair Reynolds
- Language: English
- Series: Revelation Space
- Genre: Science fiction
- Publisher: Gollancz
- Publication date: 27 November 2003
- Publication place: United Kingdom
- Media type: Print (Hardcover & Paperback)
- Pages: 565 pp (Hardcover)
- ISBN: 978-0-575-07434-7
- OCLC: 52785111
- Dewey Decimal: 823.914 21
- LC Class: PR6068.E95 A623 2003
- Preceded by: Redemption Ark
- Followed by: The Prefect

Absolution Gap is a 2003 science fiction novel written by Welsh author Alastair Reynolds. It takes place in the Revelation Space universe and is a direct sequel to Redemption Ark.

== Plot summary ==
The plot of the novel takes place in four separate time periods. The bulk of the novel is contained in the 2675 and 2727 sections.

=== 2615 ===
Queen Jasmina of the lighthugger Gnostic Ascension wakes Quaiche, a member of her crew, from Reefersleep. She is disappointed with him; despite his promises that he would improve the crew's fortunes, he has not done so. In fact, many of the systems he has explored were filled with extremely valuable artifacts which he failed to detect and were picked up by other ships. As such, she gives him one last chance.

Jasmina sends him to explore the star 107 Piscium and its planets. His lover, Morwenna, is sent with him in the scrimshaw suit, a sensory deprivation device which paralyzes and blinds its wearer until they remove it. On one of the moons of a gas giant he names Haldora (which also seems to disappear every so often for a few fractions of a second), he discovers an alien bridge, whose automated defense system attacks him. He crashes and finds he does not have enough oxygen to survive until his shuttle returns from the other side of Haldora. However, Haldora vanishes and his radio signal reaches the shuttle, which races to save him at maximum acceleration, killing Morwenna.

=== 2675 ===
On Ararat, 23 years after the events of Redemption Ark, Scorpio, a hyperpig, seeks out Nevil Clavain, who has left mainstream society, leaving Scorpio in charge. Scorpio seeks his aid in opening a capsule which has come down from space. Also with him is Vasko, a reasonably competent but naïve young man. They open the capsule and discover Ana Khouri. Khouri informs the colony that humanity is now at war with the Inhibitors. They are getting the relevant technology from Aura, Khouri's daughter, who has been modified by the Hades Matrix, an alien data repository. However, Skade has kidnapped her from Khouri's womb. Clavain and Scorpio lead a team who discover Skade in her crashed ship, which has been attacked by the Inhibitors, causing its Cryo-Arithmetic Engines (a cloaking device) to malfunction and cover the ship in ice. Skade agrees to give the colony Aura in return for Clavain's being tortured to death. Clavain agrees, but tells Scorpio to throw his corpse into the sea (where the Pattern Jugglers absorb him and reunite him with Galiana and Felka). The survivors are attacked by Inhibitor machinery, but Remontoire, a Conjoiner leading the war, protects them from space.

Back in the colony, the leaders debate as to what to do next. They eventually decide to leave. Meanwhile, Captain Brannigan of the lighthugger Nostalgia for Infinity has been preparing to do so. After some deliberation, some fourteen thousand of the over 150,000 colonists board the ship, and it leaves. In space they meet Remontoire, who gives them Aura's technology to defend themselves. The leaders debate whether or not to go to the moon Hela (which Aura suggests they do) or Yellowstone, to help evacuate the planet. They decide to do the latter, but find they are too late; by the time they reach Yellowstone (in 2698), it has been overrun. As the crew collect the last refugees attempting to escape the system, a minor mutiny breaks out amongst the upper echelons, in which Scorpio's leadership is overturned and the other leaders take power as a group. This is due to Scorpio electing to rescue the last refugees off a shuttle that had been contaminated by the Inhibitors. After the final disputes are settled, the ship is redirected towards Hela.

=== 2727 ===
Rashmika Els, a 17-year-old girl, leaves her home on Hela to search for her long-lost brother Harbin, who left to join the Cathedrals years before. The Cathedrals were set up by Quaiche after the 2615 timeline and constantly move across Hela (making use of various propulsion systems, such as legs and tracks) to "observe" Haldora and its disappearances (known as "vanishings"). It uses special indoctrinal viruses to maintain religious faith amongst its supporters, although certain areas, such as Rashmika's town, are exempt. She joins one of the caravans, a massive vehicle composed of several smaller units, to get to the "Permanent Way", where the cathedrals can be found. She has the ability to tell whenever people are lying to her, which makes Quaiche very interested in her. He uses false evidence to convince Rashmika that Harbin has become a supporter of the church. In fact he is dead. She arrives at Quaiche's Cathedral and begins working for him.

In the Cathedral she suffers nightmares about a race called the "Shadows", who exist in a parallel Brane to our own. Their universe has been consumed by a rogue terraforming agent, and they are trying to join Rashmika's. They had shown the Scuttlers, the long-extinct inhabitants of Hela, how to build a machine that could bring them across. In return, they would destroy the Inhibitors. However, the Inhibitors allegedly destroyed the Scuttlers first.

Meanwhile, the Nostalgia for Infinity makes its presence known to Hela and offers to protect it (Quaiche has been asking various lighthuggers for protection). Quaiche agrees and sends "delegates" onto the ship, who are actually soldiers. They attempt to take the ship, but the crew defeats them. Quaiche holds Khouri and Vasko hostage, as well as Rashmika (who is actually Aura). He reveals he actually wants the ship to change Hela's rotation with its engines to stop it spinning; this will permit him to keep watching Haldora eternally, without the need for moving Cathedrals. Brannigan agrees and lands, but not before he deploys a Cache Weapon on Haldora and destroys its exterior, revealing it to be the Shadows' transport mechanism.

Quaiche and Grelier (his right-hand man) leave with Aura, but Quaiche panics and dies falling from the shuttle, whilst Grelier is killed by Brannigan's hypometric weapon when he tries to hold Aura hostage. The soldiers of the Cathedrals overwhelm Brannigan and destroy him. Scorpio arrives and rescues Aura, who suggests they take the Scrimshaw suit (now a prison for the Shadows' digital envoy), but Scorpio advises against doing so; Remontoire has shown him a shard of material from Ararat, which matches similar ones found on Hela. He believes that the race that made them also killed the Scuttlers for talking to the Shadows. They leave the Scrimshaw suit and retreat as the Cathedral is destroyed. As they walk away, Khouri asks Scorpio why he saved the shuttle in the Yellowstone system and it is implied that he saw her husband, Fazil, was on the passenger manifest.

=== 3300 ===
The prologue and epilogue of the novel are both set in roughly 3125, four hundred years after the rest of the book.

==== Prologue ====
An unnamed woman and her guardian are standing on the surface of a Pattern Juggler planet which is being evacuated. The woman agrees with her guardian to spend one more hour before returning to their ship. She stares up towards the stars and has the machinery in her clothing magnify one of them, revealing it to be colored green.

==== Epilogue ====
The epilogue reveals that the woman is in fact an older version of Aura (with her guardian implied to be Scorpio), reflecting on the events that happened after the battle on Hela. Scorpio turned out to be right; the race - known as the Nestbuilders - that wiped out the Scuttlers had been watching humanity and aided them. The Nestbuilders advised humanity to hide with them between the stars, but the humans instead used Nestbuilder weaponry to defeat the Inhibitors and cleanse human space of them. However, in doing so, they created a greater problem: the so-called "Greenfly" machines, self-replicating terraformers programmed to destroy every object in a solar system and reorganize them into trillions of vegetation-filled habitats that orbit the local star (behavior that is exactly the same as the threat described by the Shadows). The Inhibitors had kept them in check, but without the Inhibitors, the Greenfly are now out of control. Nothing the humans or Nestbuilders can do has stopped them. As such, humanity is evacuating towards the Pleiades. Aura reminisces on the decision she made not to invoke the Shadows. She decides that, before she returns to the ship, she will swim with the Pattern Jugglers and warn the people they have assimilated about what is coming. She enters the ocean as the novel ends.

The Greenfly threat is described in detail in the short story "Galactic North", from its origins until the year 40,000, by which time it has spread to such an extent that humans are forced to abandon the Milky Way Galaxy.

== Reception ==
Publishers Weekly said that Absolution Gap "fulfills all the staggering promise of the earlier books, and then some", arguing that the "Cinematic imagery and strong characters ably carry this juggernaut of a story, with Big Ideas strewn about like pebbles on a beach."

== See also ==
- Revelation Space series
