= Diamond Dogs, Turquoise Days =

2003 novella collection by Alastair Reynolds

- Author: Alastair Reynolds
- Language: English
- Genre: Science fiction novel
- Publisher: Gollancz
- Publication date: 2 January 2003
- Publication place: United Kingdom
- Media type: Print (Hardcover & Paperback)
- Pages: 240
- ISBN: 0-575-07526-0 (Hardcover)
- OCLC: 226091867

Diamond Dogs, Turquoise Days is a 2003 compilation of two science fiction novellas by writer Alastair Reynolds. Both are set in the Revelation Space universe, but are almost entirely unconnected with the plots of any of the novels in the same story arc.

== Diamond Dogs ==
Set around the late 25th century, Diamond Dogs is a new treatment of the classic SF plot of the deadly maze. While visiting the Monument to the Eighty in Chasm City, Richard meets his old friend Roland Childe, who has been presumed dead for over a century and a half. Childe takes Richard back to his home, and reveals that he is assembling a team to tackle a curious artificial – alien – structure found by probes sent out secretly by his family ages ago.

The team consisted of Richard, Celestine (Richard's ex-wife who underwent Pattern Juggler neural transforms that left her with a brilliant capacity at mathematics, and who divorced Richard around 2490), Hirz (sometime hacker, sometime infiltrator, who has herself frozen between missions), Dr Trintignant (expert doctor and cyberneticist, infamous for conducting horrific medical experiments on allegedly unconsenting subjects), Forqueray (an Ultranaut, captain of the lighthugger Apollyon) and, of course, Childe himself.

From Chasm City, they travel to the alien artifact, which they promptly name "Blood Spire". Remains of the previous human explorers to visit the place lie around – supposedly they belonged to another Ultranaut crew led by a captain called Argyle, whom Childe's probe interrogated during his dying moments to gather information about the Spire.

The Spire is a series of rooms, each containing a mathematical puzzle. The doors get smaller as the rooms progress, and the rooms proceed in a spiral up the tower, which is about 250 meters high. The tower floats off the surface of the planet without any detectable force or support holding it up. The puzzles cover most of mathematics, with various questions tackling triangular numbers, rotations of four-dimensional figures and their corresponding shadows, and arcane aspects of prime number theory. It is not known what the Spire guards, or why there should be so many puzzles.

Disturbingly, the Spire also seems to be alive. Initially cold and silent, it "wakes up" and starts to warm up and vibrate once Childe's crew enters the structure. It also inflicts painful and often gruesome punishments for getting wrong answers or going over some unspecified time limit (which becomes shorter with each puzzle). Forqueray and Hirz are killed by these punishments. Celestine abandons the quest.

To deal with the Spire's puzzles, the team submit to more and more cybernetic and artificial aids by Trintignant's hand, which eventually culminate with Childe and Richard resembling nothing so much as diamond dogs, with artificially-accelerated consciousness and an advanced grasp of mathematics.

While tackling the Spire, Celestine barges in and tries to persuade Richard to abandon the quest. Apparently, Childe knew more about the Spire than he should, and medical investigation of the corpses revealed all of them came from the same individual – because they had the same DNA. It is revealed that the bodies were actually clones of Childe, who had already visited the place before, and what he did was to go in, get to where he thought he could not go on much further, and then have his memories trawled and implanted into a clone, before returning to continue solving the puzzles, and die of failure. Counting the original, the Childe then in the Spire with Richard and Celestine was the nineteenth in the series.

Finally, Richard abandons the quest only to find that Dr Trintignant, confronted with the possibility of restoring Richard to his human form and thus undoing his magnum opus, decided to commit suicide by disassembly. There was surprisingly little organic matter left among his remains, which were all sorted and placed neatly in jars and the like. Richard and Celestine end up going back to post-plague Yellowstone – when they left they could not find any new remains of Childe, who was thus presumably still inside the Spire – and Richard is left without any hope of becoming human again, since the Melding Plague wiped out most of the required technology.

In the end, Richard, faced with the sheer temptation and curiosity of the Spire, secretly slips away and hires the lighthugger Poseidon to take him "somewhere".

== Turquoise Days ==
This story is set in the year 2541 on the planet Turquoise, a Pattern Juggler world which is also the site of a human colony. It has been settled by humans for a considerable period of time, but is far behind the rest of humanity. The protagonist, Naqi loses her sister at the start of the story when she swims with the Pattern Jugglers and is absorbed by them. Later on, a lighthugger the Voice of Evening, visits the planet. The first lighthugger to do so in a long time. They're welcomed by the local government, and among the people on the lighthugger are a crew of scientists intending to study the Pattern Jugglers.

Naqi gets suspicious when the "scientists" demand access to the massive Juggler research station named the Moat. When one of the foreigners' party, who was already under suspicion, sneaks onto a boat and begins to poison the Pattern Juggler nodes, previously thought to be toxin-resistant, Naqi immediately tries to follow him, but is unable to catch up in her rotting emergency boat. When she returns to the main Moat structure and finds that all of the research crew has been murdered by the spacefarers, she quickly escapes the moat with a high-speed boat docked on the outside wall, and resumes her pursuit of the runaway spacefarer, who is also being hunted down by the others of his party.

When Naqi finally catches up with him, he reveals that the "scientists" were in fact members of a lunatic organization whose dead leader had stored his thought patterns with the Jugglers on Turquoise, and that they intended to incorporate him into all of the many-thousand strong army of followers that were waiting in orbit on the Voice of Evening. He then tells her that he was the only resistance agent able to infiltrate the Voice of Evening and that he planned to spread the rare Juggler toxin into the sea, thus destroying all of the patterns stored within the Jugglers' memory. The agent says no one knows where the toxin originated, though he mentions several rumours, one of which indicates that it had been found in the top of the Blood Spire from "Diamond Dogs".

Knowing that the release of the toxin would destroy all the other minds stored in the juggler sea as well, including her sister, Naqi refuses to allow him to destroy the Jugglers, and instead warns the Jugglers, as well as her sister, by swimming in the sea. Naqi kills the agent when he manages to release the toxin anyway.

However, it transpires that the Jugglers had developed a resistance to the toxin after the first vial that had been slipped into a contained portion of the Moat, and the overall collective is unharmed. However, the Juggler life-forms around the planet begin to attack and destroy all human settlements, effectively eradicating the threat as well as the human presence on Turquoise. In the end, Naqi takes a final swim in the ocean, and joins her sister in the Juggler collective.

== References to music and literature ==
Diamond Dogs (1974) is an album by David Bowie. "Turquoise Days" is a song on the album Heaven Up Here (1981) by Echo and the Bunnymen.

The character Roland Childe and his obsession with the spire are references to Robert Browning's poem "Childe Roland to the Dark Tower Came". During their hibernated sleep on the way to the planet, the characters in Diamond Dogs share dreams which reference the novel Rogue Moon by Algis Budrys, and the films Cube and Raiders of the Lost Ark. The clone of Roland that stars in the story is the 19th clone. 19 is a reoccurring motif in The Dark Tower Series by Stephen King, which also draws deeply from Childe Roland to the Dark Tower Came.

== Other media ==
In early 2017, The House Theatre of Chicago put on a full-length stage production of Diamond Dogs. Alastair Reynolds travelled to Chicago to have a discussion with fans about the novella, science fiction, and astrophysics, before the February 25th, 2017 show.

== See also ==
- Revelation Space universe
