= Machine Vendetta =

Book by Alastair Reynolds

- Author: Alastair Reynolds
- Language: English
- Series: Revelation Space
- Genre: Science fiction
- Publisher: Gollancz
- Publication date: 18 Jan 2024
- Publication place: London
- Media type: Print (hardcover and paperback)
- Pages: 374
- ISBN: 978-0-316-46285-3
- Preceded by: Elysium Fire

Machine Vendetta is a 2024 hard science fiction novel by Welsh author Alastair Reynolds. It is a direct sequel to Elysium Fire and the final part in The Prefect Dreyfus Emergencies trilogy. Reynolds has stated on his blog that this is the final book set in the Revelation Space universe for the foreseeable future.

Aurora Rising, Elysium Fire, and Machine Vendetta comprise the Prefect Dreyfus Emergencies series.

== Synopsis ==
Machine Vendetta follows senior prefect Tom Dreyfus' investigations into the suspicious death of fellow prefect Ingvar Tench.

== Reception ==
The novel received a starred review in Publishers Weekly, and was also reviewed by Locus Magazine and SFFWorld.
