= Chasm City =

2001 novel by Alastair Reynolds

- Author: Alastair Reynolds
- Cover artist: Chris Moore
- Language: English
- Series: Revelation Space
- Genre: Science fiction
- Publisher: Gollancz
- Publication date: 2001
- Publication place: United Kingdom
- Media type: Print (hardback & paperback)
- ISBN: 978-0575-06877-3
- Preceded by: Revelation Space
- Followed by: Redemption Ark

Chasm City is a 2001 science fiction novel by British writer Alastair Reynolds, set in the Revelation Space universe. It deals with themes of identity, memory, and immortality, and many of its scenes are concerned primarily with describing the unusual societal and physical structure of the titular city, a major nexus of Reynolds's universe. It won the 2002 British Science Fiction Association award.

== Synopsis ==
Chasm City is framed and largely written in the voice of Tanner Mirabel, a security expert who has come to Chasm City to avenge the death of his former client's wife at the hands of a "postmortal" noble named Argent Reivich.

Tanner arrives to find that Yellowstone, the most advanced civilization in human history, has descended into squalor; an alien nanotech virus known as the Melding Plague has wreaked havoc throughout the system. Chasm City, a dense forest of mile-high shapeshifting skyscrapers, has melted into a slum. The Glitter Band, a sparkling diorama of ten thousand orbital habitats, has been reduced to a "Rust Belt" of a few hundred survivors, mostly primitive and pre-nanotech antiques.

In this chaos of plague and desolation, Tanner seeks his prey, only to discover that Reivich is more clever than he originally thought. In the midst of his hunt, he begins experiencing virus-induced flashbacks from the life of Sky Haussmann, the founder of his home world, Sky's Edge, who is both revered and reviled for the crimes he committed for his people.

From the depths of the gas plume at the heart of Chasm City, to the aristocratic canopy spanning what remains of the skyscrapers, Mirabel begins to unravel the mystery of the Melding Plague.

== Awards and nominations ==
Chasm City won the 2002 British Science Fiction Association award.

== See also ==
- Revelation Space series
