= Revelation Space =

2000 novel by Alastair Reynolds

- Hardcover edition
- Author: Alastair Reynolds
- Audio read by: John Lee
- Cover artist: Chris Moore
- Language: English
- Series: Revelation Space
- Genre: Science fiction
- Publisher: Gollancz
- Publication date: 2000
- Publication place: United Kingdom
- Media type: Print (hardcover and paperback)
- Pages: 560
- ISBN: 1-85798-748-9
- OCLC: 51945804
- Followed by: Chasm City

Revelation Space is a hard science fiction space opera novel by Welsh author Alastair Reynolds, published in 2000 by Gollancz. It was Reynolds's debut novel, drawing on his background as a trained astrophysicist: he holds a PhD in astronomy from the University of St Andrews and spent over a decade working for the European Space Agency. The novel was short listed for both the BSFA Award and the Arthur C. Clarke Award.

== Summary ==
The novel begins with three seemingly unrelated narrative strands that merge as the novel progresses. The strands occur out of order and in different years, to account for the delay in traveling between star systems.

The first strand is in the year 2551, and centers around Dan Sylveste, an archaeologist excavating the remains of the long-dead Amarantin race that lived on the planet Resurgam in the Delta Pavonis system. Sylveste is obsessed with the Amarantins, and despite little evidence to support it, determined to the point of arrogance in his belief that there is a great discovery to be made. It is revealed that this behavior had caused the expedition to fracture years earlier, with half the group opting to leave Resurgam on the ship Lorean, stranding the remaining population on the planet.

The next strand centers around Ilia Volyova in the year 2543, aboard the Nostalgia for Infinity, a large ship capable of interstellar travel. Volyova and the other members of her skeleton crew wish to find Sylveste because they believe he can help them with their captain, who has been infected with the Melding Plague, a nanotech virus that attacks human cells and machine implants to pervert them into grotesque combinations. The Infinity has also been affected by the plague and is deteriorating, though its progress has been slowed by keeping the captain cryogenically frozen.

The third strand focuses on Ana Khouri, a former soldier living on the planet Yellowstone in the Epsilon Eridani system in the year 2524. Khouri lives as an assassin for hire after having been accidentally separated from her husband following a battle on the planet Sky's Edge in 61 Cygni. After establishing a reputation as a successful killer, she is hired by a mysterious figure known as the Mademoiselle to assassinate Sylveste. The Mademoiselle coerces Khouri into accepting the job by claiming she has Khouri's husband. She puts Khouri into cryogenic "reefersleep" until 2546, awaiting the arrival of the Infinity.

With help from the Mademoiselle, Khouri infiltrates the crew of the Infinity as a replacement gunnery officer, knowing that they are traveling to Resurgam on their search for Sylveste. On board the ship, Khouri and Volyova form an uneasy alliance, both concealing something from the other: Khouri that she is an assassin targeting Sylveste and has a simulation of the Mademoiselle in a brain implant, and Volyova that the former gunnery office was killed after being driven insane during his training, referencing an entity by the name of Sun Stealer. However, their bond deepens over their shared distrust of the crew and the other members of the ruling triumvirate: Sajaki and Hegazi, who rule with Volyova in absence of the captain. Khouri also learns that the crew's interest is less in Sylveste, but in a simulation he has of his father Calvin, who was a famous surgeon specializing in cybernetics.

During the Infinity's journey from Yellowstone to Resurgam, Sylveste falls out of favor with the local government, is blamed for the failed expedition, and imprisoned. In exchange for leniency, he agrees to participate in a biography of himself and is assigned to work with Pascal, a reporter that had been covering the expedition. Over the years preparing the biography, Sylveste helps with further excavation of the Amarantin city, and begins to suspect the Amarantin's had become a space-faring civilization prior to their extinction. During this time, he and Pascal fall and love and plan to marry, but during their ceremony another coup on the planet occurs and Sylveste is imprisoned again.

As the Infinity approaches Resurgam in 2566, the Mademoiselle simulation uses a training session as an opportunity to seize control of a powerful weapon on board the ship, and attempts to kill Sylveste by destroying the entire planet. Khouri and Volyova manage to destroy the weapon before it fires; however, Sun Stealer, a now suspected software entity in the gunnery controls, has used this opportunity to escape into the larger systems of the ship. Volyova and Khouri decide to hide all this from the crew when they awake from their cryosleep. The Mademoiselle's refusal to share information leaves Khouri with doubts about her assignment.

After the Infinity arrives in orbit, the triumvirate threaten to destroy the defenceless Resurgam civilization, prompting the current rulers to turn Sylveste and Pascal over to them. Once aboard, Sylveste informs the crew that he has hidden antimatter bombs inside the implants in his artificial eyes, and that he could destroy the Infinity at any time. The triumvirs doubt the legitimacy of the threat, but are not willing to test if he is bluffing or not. They come to an agreement: Sylveste will use his Calvin simulation to attempt to cure their captain in exchange for a trip to Cerberus, a mysterious nearby planet orbiting a neutron star that he believes holds the secret to the truth of Amarantin civilization.

On the trip to Cerberus, the group begins to fracture: Sylveste becomes more obsessed with what secrets the planet holds, Sajaki and Hegazi grow suspicious of how much Volyova knows, and Volyova, Khouri, and ultimately Pascal worry they are headed towards all their destruction. Volyova also comes to suspect that Sajaki has no desire to actually cure the captain, as it would require giving up his power. As they reach the planet, they learn that the planet is an artificial construct built by an ancient civilization. As Slyveste makes preparation to land on the construct, Volyova's faction seizes control of the ship, but Sun Stealer uses the opportunity to strike. It traps everyone apart from each other and lures Sylveste to travel to the planet.

On board the Infinity, Volyova's faction learn that Sun Stealer is actually an Amarantin simulation, and has manipulated circumstances from the beginning. It had infiltrated Sylveste years earlier, and was responsible for his obsession with Resurgam to get him near Cerberus. The planet is an Amarantin construct, enclosing a device built by the Inhibitors, an ancient race that sought to destroy all advanced space-faring life, and were responsible for the Amarantin's extinction. Sun Stealer believes the Inhibitors to be inactive, but plans to test this by having it scan Sylveste to determine if it recognizes humanity as a space-faring race that needs destroyed. In control of the Infinity, Sun Stealer kills Sajaki and Hegazi, and forces Volyova, Khouri, and Pascal to abandon ship. Before leaving, Volyova release the captain from cryosleep, hoping the Melding Plague will slow down Sun Stealer. Attempting to reach Sylveste to stop him, Volyova is separated from the group, and the shuttle, carrying Khouri and Pascal, is damaged and drifts into the orbit of the neutron star, and is seemingly destroyed by the immense gravity. On Cerberus, Sylveste learns the truth about Sun Stealer, and that it intends to gamble humanity on testing the Inhibitors. Sylveste choose to detonate the antimatter bombs hidden in his eyes, killing himself and stopping Sun Stealer's plans.

The novel ends with Khouri awakening on the surface of the neutron star, and meeting Sylveste and Pascal. She learns that the star is an artificial construct that serves as a vast computer, and while all of their bodies were destroyed, the computer had scanned them and was able recreate them. She also learns that the Mademoiselle was another Amarantin simulation, though one that believed it a mistake to test the Inhibitors. Sylveste and Pascal plan to stay on the construct, to learn more about the Amarantins, whose civilization was also archived. Khouri decides to leave to join Volyova, and make plans to return to the Infinity, where the Melding Plague has seemly gained control of the ship from Sun Stealer.

== Publication history ==
This was Alastair Reynolds's first published novel, and was published in a relatively small initial print run in the United Kingdom. It subsequently became a collectible first edition.

== Reception ==
Thomas M. Wagner of SF Reviews wrote that "I could simply not get certain passages and scenes out of my head. Years later I still could remember the opening scene in the archaeological dig on the lonely planet of Resurgam with remarkable clarity. The dark, eerie corridors of the vast starship Nostalgia for Infinity still brought haunting images to mind."

A Dragonsworn review notes "there's plenty of beautifully scripted action sequences, and gorgeous descriptions—especially where the Nostalgia for Infinity is concerned. Reynolds paints a vivid picture of a haunting machine in decline, and a crew that may as well be ghosts." while observing the lack of character development.

The Revelation Space Trilogy was listed in Damien Broderick's book Science Fiction: The 101 Best Novels 1985-2010.

== See also ==
- Revelation Space universe
